= Light-harvesting complexes of green plants =

Component of photosynthesis

Chlorophyll A-B binding protein
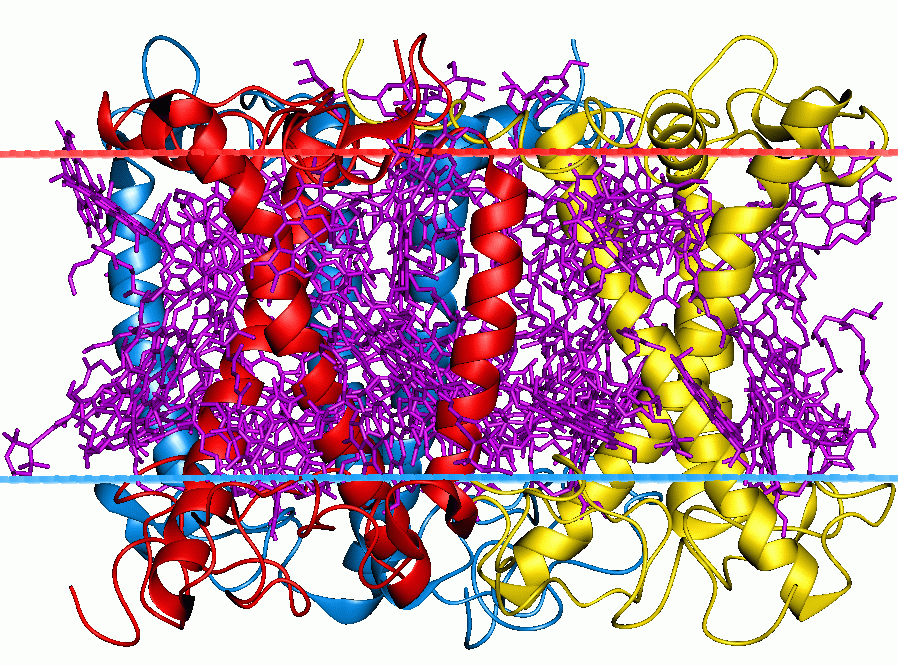
- Light-Harvesting Complex II (LHCB)

Identifiers
- Symbol: Chloroa_b-bind
- Pfam: PF00504
- InterPro: IPR022796
- SCOP2: 1rwt / SCOPe / SUPFAM
- OPM superfamily: 2
- OPM protein: 1rwt
Available protein structures:
- PDB: IPR022796 PF00504 (ECOD; PDBsum)
- AlphaFold: IPR022796; PF00504

The light-harvesting complex (or antenna complex; LH or LHC) is an array of protein and chlorophyll molecules embedded in the thylakoid membrane of plants and cyanobacteria, which transfer light energy to one chlorophyll a molecule at the reaction center of a photosystem.

The antenna pigments are predominantly chlorophyll b, xanthophylls, and carotenes. Chlorophyll a is known as the core pigment. Their absorption spectra are non-overlapping and broaden the range of light that can be absorbed in photosynthesis. The carotenoids have another role as an antioxidant to prevent photo-oxidative damage of chlorophyll molecules. Each antenna complex has between 250 and 400 pigment molecules and the energy they absorb is shuttled by resonance energy transfer to a specialized chlorophyll-protein complex known as the reaction center of each photosystem. The reaction center initiates a complex series of chemical reactions that capture energy in the form of chemical bonds.

For photosystem II, when either of the two chlorophyll a molecules at the reaction center absorb energy, an electron is excited and transferred to an electron acceptor molecule, pheophytin, leaving the chlorophyll a in an oxidized state. The oxidised chlorophyll a replaces the electrons by photolysis that involves the oxidation of water molecules to oxygen, protons and electrons.

The N-terminus of the chlorophyll a-b binding protein extends into the stroma where it is involved with adhesion of granal membranes and photo-regulated by reversible phosphorylation of its threonine residues. Both these processes are believed to mediate the distribution of excitation energy between photosystems I and II.

This family also includes the photosystem II protein PsbS, which plays a role in energy-dependent quenching that increases thermal dissipation of excess absorbed light energy in the photosystem.

== LHCI ==
Light-harvesting complex I is permanently bound to photosystem I via the plant-specific subunit PsaG. It is made up of four proteins: Lhca1, Lhca2, Lhca3, and Lhca4, all of which belong to the LHC or chlorophyll a/b-binding family. The LHC wraps around the PS1 reaction core.

== LHCII ==
The LHC-2 is usually bound to photosystem II, but it can undock and bind PS I instead depending on light conditions. This behavior is controlled by reversible phosphorylation. This reaction represents a system for balancing the excitation energy between the two photosystems.

== See also ==
- Light-harvesting complexes
