= Dioxygen in biological reactions =

Dioxygen (O_{2}) plays an important role in the energy metabolism of living organisms. Free oxygen is produced in the biosphere through photolysis (light-driven oxidation and splitting) of water during photosynthesis in cyanobacteria, green algae, and plants. During oxidative phosphorylation in aerobic respiration, oxygen is reduced to water, thus closing the biological water-oxygen redox cycle.

== Photosynthesis ==
In nature, free oxygen is produced by the light-driven splitting of water during oxygenic photosynthesis. Cyanobacteria began transforming the anaerobic earth to today's oxygen-rich world. Marine environments provide the majority of oxygen production on earth. The remainder is produced by terrestrial plants, although, for example, almost all oxygen produced in tropical forests is consumed by organisms living there.

A simplified overall formula for photosynthesis is:

6CO_{2} + 6H_{2}O + photons → C_{6}H_{12}O_{6} + 6O_{2}

(or simply carbon dioxide + water + sunlight → glucose + oxygen)

Photolytic oxygen evolution during photosynthesis occurs via the light-dependent oxidation of water to molecular oxygen and can be written as the following simplified chemical reaction: 2H_{2}O → 4e^{−} + 4H^{+} + O_{2}

The reaction occurs in the thylakoid membranes of cyanobacteria as well as algal and plant chloroplasts and requires the energy of four photons. The electrons extracted from the water molecules transfer to the electron-deficient high-energy state P680^{+} of the P680 pigment of Photosystem II, which have been removed into an electron transport chain after light-dependent excitation and a series of redox reactions onto plastoquinone. Photosystem II therefore has also been referred to as water-plastoquinone oxido-reductase. The protons split off from the water molecules are released into the thylakoid lumen, thus contributing to the generation of a proton gradient across the thylakoid membrane. This proton gradient is the driving force for ATP synthesis via photophosphorylation and couples the absorption of light energy and photolysis of water to the creation of chemical energy during photosynthesis. The O_{2} remaining after oxidation of the water molecule is released into the atmosphere.

Water oxidation is catalyzed by a manganese-containing enzyme complex known as the oxygen evolving complex (OEC) or water-splitting complex found associated with the lumenal side of thylakoid membranes. Manganese is an important cofactor, and calcium and chloride are also required for the reaction to occur.

== Oxygen uptake and transport ==
In all vertebrates, the heme group of hemoglobin binds most of the oxygen dissolved in the blood.

In vertebrates, oxygen uptake is carried out by the following processes:

Following inhalation into the lungs, oxygen diffuses through alveoli into the serum of the blood, where some remains in direct relation to the partial pressure of gasses in the inhaled gas and the balance is bonded to red blood cells. They are bound to dioxygen complexes, which are coordination compounds that contain O_{2} as a ligand, providing a higher oxygen-loading capacity. In blood, the heme group of hemoglobin binds oxygen when it is present, changing hemoglobin's color from bluish red to bright red. Vertebrate animals use hemoglobin in their blood to transport oxygen from their lungs to their tissues, but other animals use hemocyanin (molluscs and some arthropods) or hemerythrin (spiders and lobsters). A liter of blood can dissolve 200 cc of oxygen gas, which is much more than water can dissolve.

After being carried in blood to a body tissue in need of oxygen, O_{2} is handed off from the heme group to monooxygenase, an enzyme that also has an active site with an atom of iron. Monooxygenase uses oxygen for many oxidation reactions in the body. Oxygen that is suspended in the blood plasma equalizes into the tissue according to Henry's law. Carbon dioxide, a waste product, is released from the cells and into the blood, where it is converted to bicarbonate or binds to hemoglobin for transport to the lungs. Blood circulates back to the lungs and the process repeats.

== Aerobic respiration ==
Molecular oxygen, O_{2}, is essential for cellular respiration in all aerobic organisms. Oxygen is used as an electron acceptor in mitochondria to generate chemical energy in the form of adenosine triphosphate (ATP) during oxidative phosphorylation. The reaction for the aerobic respiration is essentially the reverse of photosynthesis, except that now there is a large release of chemical energy which is stored in ATP molecules (up to 38 ATP molecules are formed from one molecule of glucose and 6 O_{2} molecules). The simplified version of this reaction is:

C_{6}H_{12}O_{6} + 6O_{2} → 6CO_{2} + 6H_{2}O + 2880 kJ/mol

== Reactive oxygen species ==
Reactive oxygen species are molecules containing at least one oxygen atom and one or more unpaired electrons. Reactive oxygen species (ROS) are by-products of cell aerobic respiration. Important examples include; oxygen free radicals such as the hydroxyl radical (HO·), superoxide anion radical (O2-), hydrogen peroxide (H_{2}O_{2}), hydroperoxyl radical, nitric oxide (NO) and singlet oxygen. The body uses superoxide dismutase to reduce superoxide radicals to hydrogen peroxide. Glutathione peroxidase and similar enzymes then convert the H_{2}O_{2} to water and dioxygen.

Parts of the immune system of higher organisms, however, create peroxide, superoxide, and singlet oxygen to destroy invading microbes. Recently, singlet oxygen has been found to be a source of biologically-produced ozone: This reaction proceeds through an unusual compound dihydrogen trioxide, also known as trioxidane, (HOOOH), which is an antibody-catalyzed product of singlet oxygen and water. This compound, in turn, disproportionates to ozone and peroxide, providing two powerful antibacterials. The body's range of defense against all of these active oxidizing agents is hardly surprising, then, given their "deliberate" employment as antimicrobial agents in the immune response. Reactive oxygen species also play an important role in the hypersensitive response of plants against pathogen attack.

== See also ==
- Oxygen cycle
- Oxygen-haemoglobin dissociation curve
- Oxygen
- Apparent oxygen utilisation
- CO-oximeter
- Oxygen catastrophe
- Oxygen toxicity
- Reactive oxygen species
