= PhotoRC RNA motifs =

Consensus secondary structure of PhotoRC-I RNAs and PhotoRC-II RNAs. This figure is adapted from a previous publication. These structures are represented by Rfam families RF01716 and RF01717

PhotoRC RNA motifs refer to conserved RNA structures that are associated with genes acting in the photosynthetic reaction centre of photosynthetic bacteria. Two such RNA classes were identified and called the PhotoRC-I and PhotoRC-II motifs. PhotoRC-I RNAs were detected in the genomes of some cyanobacteria. Although no PhotoRC-II RNA has been detected in cyanobacteria, one is found in the genome of a purified phage that infects cyanobacteria. Both PhotoRC-I and PhotoRC-II RNAs are present in sequences derived from DNA that was extracted from uncultivated marine bacteria.

The PhotoRC motif RNAs are located upstream of, and presumably in the 5′ untranslated regions (5′ UTRs), of genes that are sometimes annotated as psbA. The proteins encoded by psbA genes form the reaction center of the photosystem II complex. It was proposed that PhotoRC RNAs are cis-regulatory elements functioning at the RNA level, since bacterial cis-regulatory RNAs typically reside in 5′ UTRs.
