= Quantasome =

Particle found in living cells

Quantasomes are particles found in the thylakoid membrane of chloroplasts in which photosynthesis takes place.

An individual quantasome is measured to be about 185 Å long, 155 Å wide, and 100 Å thick. Molecular weight and density measurements have indicated that one quantasome contains 230 chlorophyll molecules.

== See also ==
- Light-dependent reactions
- Photophosphorylation
- Photosynthetic reaction centre
- Photosystem II
- Thylakoid
