= Photosystem =

Structural units of protein involved in photosynthesis

Photosystems are functional and structural units of protein complexes involved in photosynthesis. Together they carry out the primary photochemistry of photosynthesis: the absorption of light and the transfer of energy and electrons. Photosystems are found in the thylakoid membranes of plants, algae, and cyanobacteria. These membranes are located inside the chloroplasts of plants and algae, and in the cytoplasmic membrane of photosynthetic bacteria. There are two kinds of photosystems: PSI and PSII.

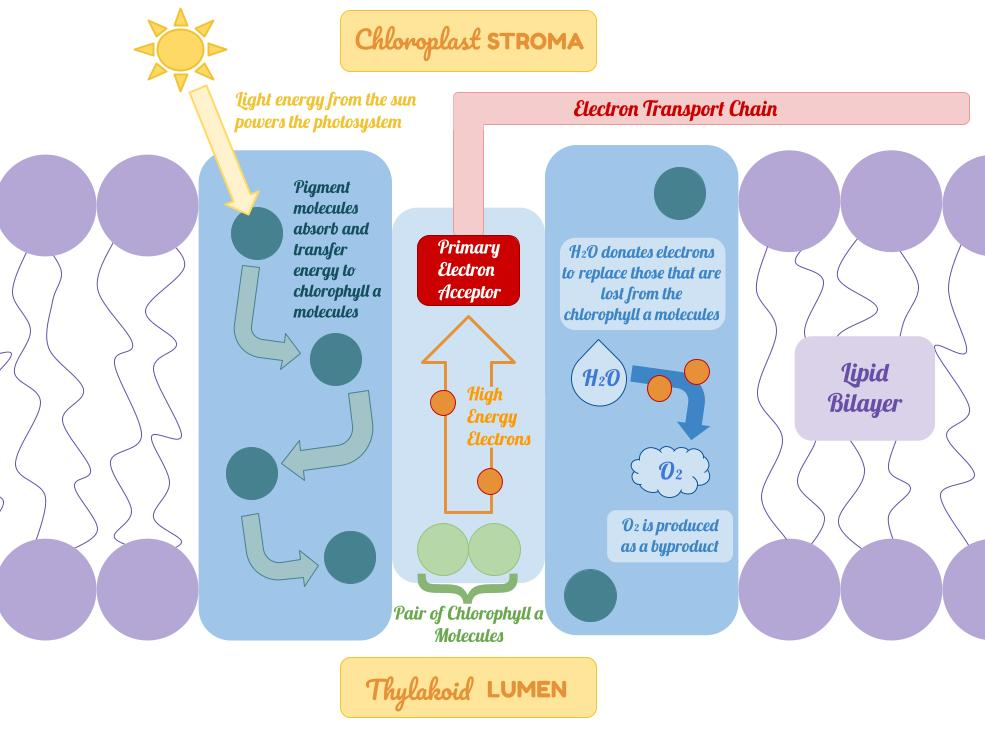
Model of a photosystem and how it uses light energy to carry out processes.

PSII will absorb red light, and PSI will absorb far-red light. Although photosynthetic activity will be detected when the photosystems are exposed to either red or far-red light, the photosynthetic activity will be the greatest when plants are exposed to both wavelengths of light. Studies have actually demonstrated that the two wavelengths together have a synergistic effect on the photosynthetic activity, rather than an additive one.

Light-dependent reactions of photosynthesis at the thylakoid membrane

Each photosystem has two parts: a reaction center, where the photochemistry occurs, and an antenna complex, which surrounds the reaction center. The antenna complex contains hundreds of chlorophyll molecules which funnel the excitation energy to the center of the photosystem. At the reaction center, the energy will be trapped and transferred to produce a high energy molecule.

The main function of PSII is to efficiently split water into oxygen molecules and protons. PSII will provide a steady stream of electrons to PSI, which will boost these in energy and transfer them to NADP^{+} and H^{+} to make NADPH. The hydrogen from this NADPH can then be used in a number of different processes within the plant.

== Reaction centers ==
Reaction centers are multi-protein complexes found within the thylakoid membrane.

At the heart of a photosystem lies the reaction center, which is an enzyme that uses light to reduce and oxidize molecules (give off and take up electrons). This reaction center is surrounded by light-harvesting complexes. The pigments that absorb the highest energy light are furthest from the reaction center. The energy they acquire is transferred - or funneled - to the inner part. At the reaction center, the special chlorophyll molecule will be excited, inducing electron transfer. In rare cases, ET does not occur, so the excited state relaxes (loses energy) by fluorescence back to the ground state. that can then be used by the chloroplast.

Two families of reaction centers in photosystems can be distinguished: type I reaction centers (such as photosystem I (P700) in chloroplasts and in green-sulfur bacteria) and type II reaction centers (such as photosystem II (P680) in chloroplasts and in non-sulfur purple bacteria). The two photosystems evolved from a common ancestor.

Each of the photosystem can be distinguished by the wavelength of light to which it is most reactive (700 nanometers for PSI and 680 nanometers for PSII in chloroplasts), the amount and type of light-harvesting complex present, and the type of terminal electron acceptor used.

Type I photosystems use ferredoxin-like iron-sulfur cluster proteins as terminal electron acceptors, while type II photosystems ultimately shuttle electrons to a quinone terminal electron acceptor. Both reaction center types are present in chloroplasts and cyanobacteria, and work together to form a unique photosynthetic chain able to extract electrons from water, creating oxygen as a byproduct.

== Structure of PSI and PSII ==
Each photosystem has two main subunits: an antenna complex (a light harvesting complex or LHC) and a reaction center. The antenna complex is where light is captured, while the reaction center is where this light energy is transformed into chemical energy. At the reaction center, there are many polypeptides that are surrounded by pigment proteins. At the center of the reaction center is a special pair of chlorophyll molecules. A reaction center comprises several (about 25-30) protein subunits, which provide a scaffold for a series of cofactors. The cofactors can be pigments (like chlorophyll, pheophytin, carotenoids), quinones, or iron-sulfur clusters.

=== PSI ===
The cyclic light-dependent reactions occur only when the sole photosystem being used is photosystem I. Photosystem I excites electrons which then cycle from the transport protein, ferredoxin (Fd), to cytochrome b_{6}f complex, to another transport protein, plastocyanin (Pc), and back to photosystem I. A proton gradient is created across the thylakoid membrane (6) as protons (3) are transported from the chloroplast stroma (4) to the thylakoid lumen (5). Through chemiosmosis, ATP (9) is produced where ATP synthase (1) binds an inorganic phosphate group (8) to an ADP molecule (7).

PSI accepts electrons from plastocyanin and transfers them either to NADPH (noncyclic electron transport) or back to cytochrome b_{6}f (cyclic electron transport):

                        plastocyanin → P700 → P700* → FNR → NADPH
                             ↑                ↓
                           b6f        ←    phylloquinone

PSI, like PSII, is a complex, highly organized transmembrane structure that contains antenna chlorophylls, a reaction center (P700), phylloquinone, and a number of iron-sulfur proteins that serve as intermediate redox carriers.

=== PSII ===
PSII is a complex highly organized transmembrane structure that contains a water splitting complex, chlorophylls and carotenoid pigments, a reaction center (P680), pheophytin (a pigment similar to chlorophyll), and two quinones. It uses the energy of sunlight to oxidize water to a mobile electron carrier in the membrane called plastoquinone:

H_{2}O → P680 → P680^{*} → plastoquinol

Plastoquinol, in turn, transfers electrons to cyt b_{6}f, which feeds them into PSI.

The excitation P680 → P680^{*} of the reaction center pigment P680 occurs here. These special chlorophyll molecules embedded in PSII absorb the energy of photons, with maximal absorption at 680 nm. Electrons within these molecules are promoted to a higher-energy state. This is one of two core processes in photosynthesis, and it occurs with astonishing efficiency (greater than 90%) because, in addition to direct excitation by light at 680 nm, the energy of light first harvested by antenna proteins at other wavelengths in the light-harvesting system is also transferred to these special chlorophyll molecules.

This is followed by the electron transfer P680^{*} → pheophytin, and then on to plastoquinol, which occurs within the reaction center of PSII. The electrons are transferred to plastoquinone and two protons, generating plastoquinol, which released into the membrane as a mobile electron carrier. This is the second core process in photosynthesis. The initial stages occur within picoseconds, with an efficiency of 100%. The seemingly impossible efficiency is due to the precise positioning of molecules within the reaction center. This is a solid-state process, not a typical chemical reaction. It occurs within an essentially crystalline environment created by the macromolecular structure of PSII. The usual rules of chemistry (which involve random collisions and random energy distributions) do not apply in solid-state environments.

Each PSII has about 8 LHCII. These contain about 14 chlorophyll a and chlorophyll b molecules, as well as about four carotenoids. In the reaction center of PSII of plants and cyanobacteria, the light energy is used to split water into oxygen, protons, and electrons. The protons will be used in proton pumping to fuel the ATP synthase at the end of an electron transport chain. A majority of the reactions occur at the D1 and D2 subunits of PSII.

== In oxygenic photosynthesis ==
Both photosystem I and II are required for oxygenic photosynthesis. Oxygenic photosynthesis can be performed by plants and cyanobacteria; cyanobacteria are believed to be the progenitors of the photosystem-containing chloroplasts of eukaryotes. Photosynthetic bacteria that cannot produce oxygen have only one photosystem, which is similar to either PSI or PSII.

At the core of photosystem II is P680, a special chlorophyll to which incoming excitation energy from the antenna complex is funneled. One of the electrons of excited P680* will be transferred to a non-fluorescent molecule, which ionizes the chlorophyll and boosts its energy further, enough that it can split water in the oxygen evolving complex (OEC) of PSII and recover its electron. At the heart of the OEC are 4 Mn atoms, each of which can trap one electron. The electrons harvested from the splitting of two waters fill the OEC complex in its highest-energy state, which holds 4 excess electrons.

Electrons travel through the cytochrome b6f complex to photosystem I via an electron transport chain within the thylakoid membrane. Energy from PSI drives this process and is harnessed (the whole process is termed chemiosmosis) to pump protons across the membrane, into the thylakoid lumen space from the chloroplast stroma. This will provide a potential energy difference between lumen and stroma, which amounts to a proton-motive force that can be utilized by the proton-driven ATP synthase to generate ATP. If electrons only pass through once, the process is termed noncyclic photophosphorylation, but if they pass through PSI and the proton pump multiple times it is called cyclic photophosphorylation.

When the electron reaches photosystem I, it fills the electron deficit of light-excited reaction-center chlorophyll P700^{+} of PSI. The electron may either continue to go through cyclic electron transport around PSI or pass, via ferredoxin, to the enzyme NADP^{+} reductase. Electrons and protons are added to NADP^{+} to form NADPH. This reducing (hydrogenation) agent is transported to the Calvin cycle to react with glycerate 3-phosphate, along with ATP to form glyceraldehyde 3-phosphate, the basic building block from which plants can make a variety of substances.

== Photosystem repair ==
In intense light, plants use various mechanisms to prevent damage to their photosystems. They are able to release some light energy as heat, but the excess light can also produce reactive oxygen species. While some of these can be detoxified by antioxidants, the remaining oxygen species will be detrimental to the photosystems of the plant. More specifically, the D1 subunit in the reaction center of PSII can be damaged. Studies have found that deg1 proteins are involved in the degradation of these damaged D1 subunits. New D1 subunits can then replace these damaged D1 subunits in order to allow PSII to function properly again.

In non-cyclic photophosphorylation, PSII absorbs a photon to produce a so-called high energy electron which transfers via an electron transport chain to cytochrome b_{6}f and then to PSI. The then-reduced PSI absorbs another photon producing a more highly reducing electron, which converts NADP^{+} to NADPH. In the cyclic form, only PSI is involved, and the electron is moved through cytochrome b_{6}f before returning to PSI; NADPH is not produced. Thus, the balance between the two types of photophosphorylation is important to maintain the concentrations of ATP and NADPH in the right proportion for the light-independent reactions. For both cyclic and non-cyclic photophosphorylation, cytochrome b_{6}f produces a proton gradient across the thylakoid membrane that creates a proton-motive force, which is then used by ATP synthase to form ATP.

In oxygenic photosynthesis, the first electron donor is water, creating oxygen (O_{2}) as a by-product. In anoxygenic photosynthesis, various electron donors are used.

The net-reaction of the light-dependent reactions using non-cyclic photophosphorylation in oxygenic photosynthesis is:

2H_{2}O + 2NADP^{+} + 3ADP + 3P_{i} → O_{2} + 2H^{+} + 2NADPH + 3ATP

PSI and PSII are light-harvesting complexes. If a special pigment molecule in a photosynthetic reaction center absorbs a photon, an electron in this pigment attains the excited state and then is transferred to another molecule in the reaction center. This reaction, called photoinduced charge separation, is the start of the electron flow and transforms light energy into chemical forms.

== In chloroplasts ==
The photosynthesis process in chloroplasts begins when an electron of P680 of PSII attains a higher-energy level. This energy is used to reduce a chain of electron acceptors that have subsequently higher redox potentials. This chain of electron acceptors is known as an electron transport chain. When this chain reaches PSI, an electron is again excited, creating a high redox-potential. The electron transport chain of photosynthesis is often put in a diagram called the Z-scheme, because the redox diagram from P680 to P700 resembles the letter Z.

The final product of PSII is plastoquinol, a mobile electron carrier in the membrane. Plastoquinol transfers the electron from PSII to the proton pump, cytochrome b6f. The ultimate electron donor of PSII is water. Cytochrome b_{6}f transfers the electron chain to PSI through plastocyanin molecules. PSI can continue the electron transfer in two different ways. It can transfer the electrons either to plastoquinol again, creating a cyclic electron flow, or to an enzyme called FNR (Ferredoxin—NADP(+) reductase), creating a non-cyclic electron flow. PSI releases FNR into the stroma, where it reduces NADP^{+} to NADPH.

Activities of the electron transport chain, especially from cytochrome b_{6}f, lead to pumping of protons from the stroma to the lumen. The resulting transmembrane proton gradient is used to make ATP via ATP synthase.

The overall process of the photosynthetic electron transport chain in chloroplasts is:

H_{2}O → PSII → plastoquinol → cyt b_{6}f → plastocyanin → PSI → NADPH

=== Water-splitting complex ===
The step H_{2}O → P680 is performed by an imperfectly understood structure embedded within PSII called the water-splitting complex or oxygen-evolving complex (OEC). It catalyzes a reaction that splits water into electrons, protons and oxygen,

2H_{2}O → 4H^{+} + 4e^{-} + O_{2}

using energy from P680^{+}. The actual steps of the above reaction possibly occur in the following way (Kok's diagram of S-states): (I) 2H_{2}O (monoxide) (II) OH. H_{2}O (hydroxide) (III) H_{2}O_{2} (peroxide) (IV)HO_{2} (super oxide)(V) O_{2} (di-oxygen). (Dolai's mechanism)

The electrons are transferred to special chlorophyll molecules (embedded in PSII) that are promoted to a higher-energy state by the energy of photons.

=== Link of water-splitting complex and chlorophyll excitation ===
When the excited chlorophyll P680^{*} passes the electron to pheophytin, it converts to high-energy P680^{+}, which can oxidize the tyrosine_{Z} (or Y_{Z}) molecule by ripping off one of its hydrogen atoms. The high-energy oxidized tyrosine gives off its energy and returns to the ground state by taking up a proton and removing an electron from the oxygen-evolving complex and ultimately from water. Kok's S-state diagram shows the reactions of water splitting in the oxygen-evolving complex.

=== Cytochrome b_{6}f ===
PSII and PSI are connected by a transmembrane proton pump, cytochrome b_{6}f complex (plastoquinol—plastocyanin reductase; EC 1.10.99.1). Electrons from PSII are carried by plastoquinol to cyt b_{6}f, where they are removed in a stepwise fashion (re-forming plastoquinone) and transferred to a water-soluble electron carrier called plastocyanin. This redox process is coupled to the pumping of four protons across the membrane. The resulting proton gradient (together with the proton gradient produced by the water-splitting complex in PSI) is used to make ATP via ATP synthase.

The structure and function of cytochrome b_{6}f (in chloroplasts) is very similar to cytochrome bc_{1} (Complex III in mitochondria). Both are transmembrane structures that remove electrons from a mobile, lipid-soluble electron carrier (plastoquinone in chloroplasts; ubiquinone in mitochondria) and transfer them to a mobile, water-soluble electron carrier (plastocyanin in chloroplasts; cytochrome c in mitochondria). Both are proton pumps that produce a transmembrane proton gradient. In fact, cytochrome b_{6} and subunit IV are homologous to mitochondrial cytochrome b and the Rieske iron-sulfur proteins of the two complexes are homologous. However, cytochrome f and cytochrome c_{1} are not homologous.

== In bacteria ==
The same transmembrane structures are also found in cyanobacteria.

Unlike plants and algae, cyanobacteria are prokaryotes. They do not contain chloroplasts; rather, they bear a striking resemblance to chloroplasts themselves. This suggests that organisms resembling cyanobacteria were the evolutionary precursors of chloroplasts. One imagines primitive eukaryotic cells taking up cyanobacteria as intracellular symbionts in a process known as endosymbiosis.

=== Cyanobacteria ===
Cyanobacteria contain both PSI and PSII. Their light-harvesting system is different from that found in plants (they use phycobilins, rather than chlorophylls, as antenna pigments), but their electron transport chain

         H2O → PSII → plastoquinol → b6f → cytochrome c6 → PSI → ferredoxin  →  NADPH
                                                  ↑                     ↓
                                                 b6f       ←     plastoquinol

is, in essence, the same as the electron transport chain in chloroplasts. The mobile water-soluble electron carrier is cytochrome c_{6} in cyanobacteria, having been replaced by plastocyanin in plants.

Cyanobacteria can also synthesize ATP by oxidative phosphorylation, in the manner of other bacteria. The electron transport chain is

           NADH dehydrogenase → plastoquinol → b6f → cyt c6 → cyt aa3 → O2

where the mobile electron carriers are plastoquinol and cytochrome c_{6}, while the proton pumps are NADH dehydrogenase, cyt b_{6}f and cytochrome aa_{3} (member of the COX3 family).

Cyanobacteria are the only bacteria that produce oxygen during photosynthesis. Earth's primordial atmosphere was anoxic. Organisms like cyanobacteria produced our present-day oxygen-containing atmosphere.

The other two major groups of photosynthetic bacteria, purple bacteria and green sulfur bacteria, contain only a single photosystem and do not produce oxygen.

=== Purple bacteria ===
Purple bacteria contain a single photosystem that is structurally related to PSII in cyanobacteria and chloroplasts:

P870 → P870^{*} → ubiquinone → cyt bc_{1} → cyt c_{2} → P870

This is a cyclic process in which electrons are removed from an excited chlorophyll molecule (bacteriochlorophyll; P870), passed through an electron transport chain to a proton pump (cytochrome bc_{1} complex; similar to the chloroplastic one), and then returned to the chlorophyll molecule. The result is a proton gradient that is used to make ATP via ATP synthase. As in cyanobacteria and chloroplasts, this is a solid-state process that depends on the precise orientation of various functional groups within a complex transmembrane macromolecular structure.

To make NADPH, purple bacteria use an external electron donor (hydrogen, hydrogen sulfide, sulfur, sulfite, or organic molecules such as succinate and lactate) to feed electrons into a reverse electron transport chain.

=== Green sulfur bacteria ===
Green sulfur bacteria contain a photosystem that is analogous to PSI in chloroplasts:

                            P840 → P840* → ferredoxin → NADH
                              ↑                ↓
                           cyt c553 ← bc1 ← menaquinol

There are two pathways of electron transfer. In cyclic electron transfer, electrons are removed from an excited chlorophyll molecule, passed through an electron transport chain to a proton pump, and then returned to the chlorophyll. The mobile electron carriers are, as usual, a lipid-soluble quinone and a water-soluble cytochrome. The resulting proton gradient is used to make ATP.

In noncyclic electron transfer, electrons are removed from an excited chlorophyll molecule and used to reduce NAD^{+} to NADH. The electrons removed from P840 must be replaced. This is accomplished by removing electrons from H_{2}S, which is oxidized to sulfur (hence the name "green sulfur bacteria").

Purple bacteria and green sulfur bacteria occupy relatively minor ecological niches in the present day biosphere. They are of interest because of their importance in precambrian ecologies, and because their methods of photosynthesis were the likely evolutionary precursors of those in modern plants.

== History ==
The first ideas about light being used in photosynthesis were proposed by Jan IngenHousz in 1779 who recognized it was sunlight falling on plants that was required, although Joseph Priestley had noted the production of oxygen without the association with light in 1772. Cornelis Van Niel proposed in 1931 that photosynthesis is a case of general mechanism where a photon of light is used to photo decompose a hydrogen donor and the hydrogen being used to reduce CO_{2}. Then in 1939, Robin Hill demonstrated that isolated chloroplasts would make oxygen, but not fix CO_{2}, showing the light and dark reactions occurred in different places. Although they are referred to as light and dark reactions, both of them take place only in the presence of light. This led later to the discovery of photosystems I and II.

== See also ==
- Light reaction
- Photoinhibition
- Photosynthetic reaction centre
