= Charge-transfer =

Charge-transfer may refer to:

- Intervalence charge transfer
- Charge-transfer complex
- Charge transfer band (absorption band)
- Charge-exchange ionization, a form of gas phase ionization

== See also ==
- Photoinduced charge separation
