= Foliose lichen =

Growth form as flattened sheets, partly attached to the substrate on the underside

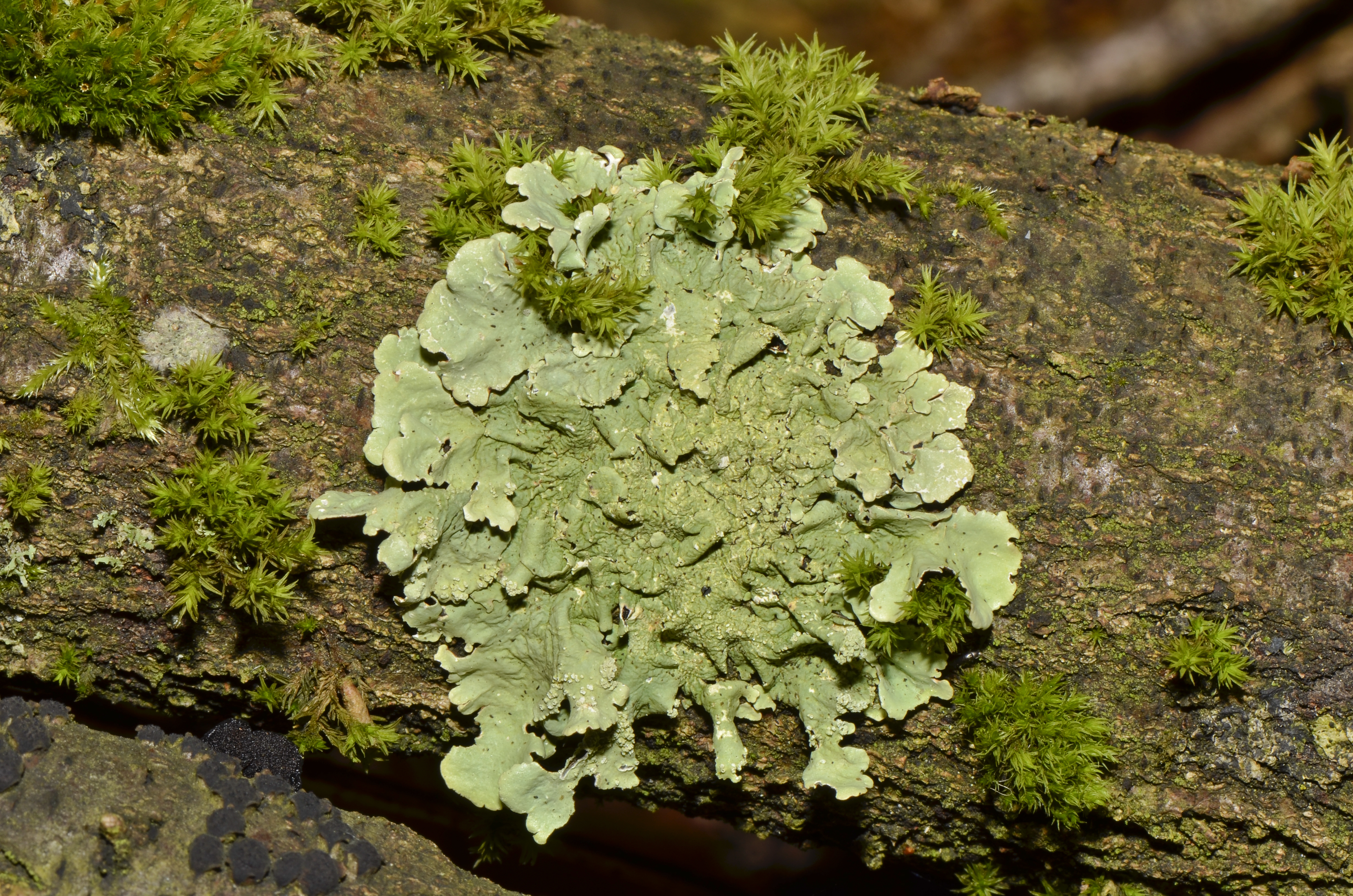
Flavoparmelia caperata, a species of foliose lichen, on a tree branch

Cross section diagram of foliose lichen with layers: 1. Thick layers of hyphae, called the cortex 2. Green algae 3. Loosely packed hyphae 4. Anchoring hyphae called rhizines.

A foliose lichen is a lichen with flat, leaf-like lobes, which are generally not firmly bonded to the substrate on which it grows. It is one of the three most common growth forms of lichens. It typically has distinct upper and lower surfaces, each of which is usually covered with a cortex; some, however, lack a lower cortex. The photobiont layer lies just below the upper cortex. Where present, the lower cortex is usually dark (sometimes even black), but occasionally white. Foliose lichens are attached to their substrate either by hyphae extending from the cortex or medulla, or by root-like structures called rhizines. The latter, which are found only in foliose lichens, come in a variety of shapes, the specifics of which can aid in species identification. Some foliose lichens attach only at a single stout peg called a holdfast, typically located near the lichen's centre. Lichens with this structure are called "umbilicate". In general, medium to large epiphytic foliose lichens are moderately sensitive to air pollution, while smaller or ground-dwelling foliose lichens are more tolerant. The term "foliose" derives from the Latin word foliosus, meaning "leafy".

== Pollution ==
A direct correlation exists between pollution and the abundance and distribution of lichen. Foliose lichens are extremely sensitive to sulphur dioxide, which is a by-product of atmospheric pollution. Sulphur dioxide reacts with the chlorophyll in lichen, which produces phaeophytin and magnesium ions. When this reaction occurs in plants the lichen will then have less chlorophyll, causing a decrease in respiration that eventually kills the lichen.

== Weathering of rocks ==
Minerals in rocks can be weathered by the growth of lichens on exposed rock surfaces. This can be attributed to both physical and chemical processes. Lichen can chemically weather minerals such as calcite by producing organic acids like oxalic acid. This reacts with minerals in the rock, dissolving them and weakening the rock. As a result of this many rocks that have or once had lichen growth exhibit extensive surface corrosion. By-products of this weathering are poorly ordered iron oxides and amorphous alumino-silica gels, the neoformation of crystalline metal oxalates and secondary clay minerals. Lichen physically weather rocks by penetrating the rock's small crevasses with their rhizoids. The expansion and contraction of the roots causes smaller cracks to expand.

These combined processes – of chemical and physical weathering – also serve to deteriorate asphalt shingles, with foliose lichen byproducts dissolving the limestone (calcium carbonate) used as filler and their rhizoids expanding cracks which develop in the shingles over time.

== Reproduction ==
The reproduction of foliose lichen can occur either asexually or sexually. The sexual reproduction requires both a fungal and photosynthetic partner. The photobiont once in symbionce with its fungal partner will not produce recognisable reproductive structures therefore it is up to the fungal partner to continue reproduction for the lichen. In order for lichen reproduction to take place the fungal partner must produce millions of germinating spores which fuse to form a zygote that must then also find a compatible photobiont. This photobiont will fuse with the zygote and live within the fungi creating a lichen. The fungal partner in most foliose lichen are ascomytes with spores called ascomata. The fruiting bodies of lichen typically make up one of two shapes. Apothecia which look like disk or cup shaped and produce their spores on their upper surface. And perithecia which are shaped like flasks that enclose a spore producing layer with a hole at the top ( Brodo, Sharnoff, and Sharnoff). Since sexual reproduction is inefficient, lichen will reproduce asexually by vegetative reproduction when possible. Foliose lichen use isidia which are cylindrical finger like protuberances from the upper cortex in which algal and fungal tissue is incorporated into. They are easily broken off and transported by wind where they will relocate and propagate forming a new lichen.

== Sources ==
- Baron, George (1999). Understanding Lichens. Slough: Richmond Publishing. ISBN 978-0-85546-252-9.
- Brodo, Irwin M.; Sharnoff, Sylvia Duran; Sharnoff, Stephen (2001). Lichens of North America. New Haven, CT: Yale University Press. ISBN 978-0-300-08249-4.
- "National Lichens & Air Quality Database and Clearinghouse". United States Forest Service.
- Ulloa, Miguel; Hanlin, Richard T. (2012). Illustrated Dictionary of Mycology (2nd ed.). St. Paul, Minnesota: The American Phytopathological Society. ISBN 978-0-89054-400-6.
