= Photophosphorylation =

Biochemical process in photosynthesis

Photophosphorylation in the light-dependent reactions of photosynthesis, which occurs at the thylakoid membrane in chloroplasts and cyanobacteria.

Photophosphorylation is the process of phosphorylation of ADP to form ATP using the energy from photons (e.g. from sunlight) in photosynthesis. There are two types: cyclic photophosphorylation and non-cyclic photophosphorylation.

In photophosphorylation, light energy is used to pump protons across a biological membrane, mediated by flow of electrons through an electron transport chain, storing potential energy in a proton gradient. The protons return across the membrane through an enzyme called ATP synthase which synthesises ATP from ADP and inorganic phosphate. ATP is essential in the Calvin cycle to supply energy for the synthesis of carbohydrates from carbon dioxide and NADPH.

== Bioenergetic integration and universality of the proton gradient ==
Photophosphorylation represents a specific instance of a more general bioenergetic principle: the conservation of energy through transmembrane electrochemical gradients. The synthesis of ATP by ATP synthase, driven by a proton motive force, is a highly conserved mechanism across all domains of life, occurring in chloroplasts, cyanobacteria, mitochondria, and the plasma membranes of many prokaryotes.

This structural and functional conservation indicates that photophosphorylation and oxidative phosphorylation share a common evolutionary foundation, differing primarily in the source of energy used to generate the proton gradient—light energy in photosynthetic systems and redox energy derived from chemical substrates in respiratory systems.

From a physiological perspective, photophosphorylation supplies ATP not only for the Calvin–Benson cycle but also for maintaining redox balance and ionic homeostasis within the chloroplast. In photosynthetic prokaryotes such as cyanobacteria, photophosphorylation is functionally integrated with other energy-conserving pathways, highlighting that cellular bioenergetics operates as a coordinated network of energy fluxes rather than as isolated reaction sequences.

The formulation of the chemiosmotic theory unified these observations by demonstrating that the transmembrane proton gradient itself constitutes the central intermediate of biological energy conversion, replacing earlier models based on discrete high-energy chemical intermediates. Within this framework, photophosphorylation is understood as part of a broader class of chemiosmotic processes in which membrane structure, electron transport, and ATP synthesis form an inseparable functional unit.

== ATP and reactions ==
Both the structure of ATP synthase an its underlying gene are remarkably similar in all known forms of life. ATP synthase is powered by a transmembrane electrochemical potential gradient, usually in the form of a proton gradient. In all living organisms, a series of redox reactions is used to produce a transmembrane electrochemical potential gradient, or a so-called proton motive force (pmf).

Redox reactions are chemical reactions in which electrons are transferred from a donor molecule to an acceptor molecule. The underlying force driving these reactions is the Gibbs free energy of the reactants relative to the products. If donor and acceptor (the reactants) are of higher free energy than the reaction products, the electron transfer may occur spontaneously. The Gibbs free energy is the energy available ("free") to do work. Any reaction that decreases the overall Gibbs free energy of a system will proceed spontaneously (given that the system is isobaric and also at constant temperature), although the reaction may proceed slowly if it is kinetically inhibited.

The fact that a reaction is thermodynamically possible does not mean that it will actually occur. A mixture of hydrogen gas and oxygen gas does not spontaneously ignite. It is necessary either to supply an activation energy or to lower the intrinsic activation energy of the system, in order to make most biochemical reactions proceed at a useful rate. Living systems use complex macromolecular structures to lower the activation energies of biochemical reactions.

It is possible to couple a thermodynamically favorable reaction (a transition from a high-energy state to a lower-energy state) to a thermodynamically unfavorable reaction (such as a separation of charges, or the creation of an osmotic gradient), in such a way that the overall free energy of the system decreases (making it thermodynamically possible), while useful work is done at the same time. The principle that biological macromolecules catalyze a thermodynamically unfavorable reaction if and only if a thermodynamically favorable reaction occurs simultaneously, underlies all known forms of life.

The transfer of electrons from a donor molecule to an acceptor molecule can be spatially separated into a series of intermediate redox reactions. This is an electron transport chain (ETC). Electron transport chains often produce energy in the form of a transmembrane electrochemical potential gradient. The gradient can be used to transport molecules across membranes. Its energy can be used to produce ATP or to do useful work, for instance mechanical work of a rotating bacterial flagella.

== Cyclic photophosphorylation ==
=== In chloroplasts and cyanobacteria ===
Animated graphic of cyclic photophosphorylation.: 1. ATP synthase; 2. Electron (purple circle); 3. Proton (red circle); 4. Stroma; 5. Lumen; 6. Thylakoid membrane

In plants, this form of photophosphorylation occurs on the stroma lamella, or fret channels. In cyclic photophosphorylation, the high-energy electron released from P700, a pigment in a complex called photosystem I, flows in a cyclic pathway. The electron starts in photosystem I, passes from the primary electron acceptor to ferredoxin and then to plastoquinone, next to cytochrome b_{6}f (a similar complex to that found in mitochondria), and finally to plastocyanin before returning to photosystem I. This transport chain produces a proton-motive force, pumping H^{+} ions across the membrane and producing a concentration gradient that can be used to power ATP synthase during chemiosmosis. This pathway is known as cyclic photophosphorylation, and it produces neither O_{2} nor NADPH. Unlike non-cyclic photophosphorylation, NADP^{+} does not accept the electrons; they are instead sent back to the cytochrome b_{6}f complex.

=== In other phototrophic bacteria ===
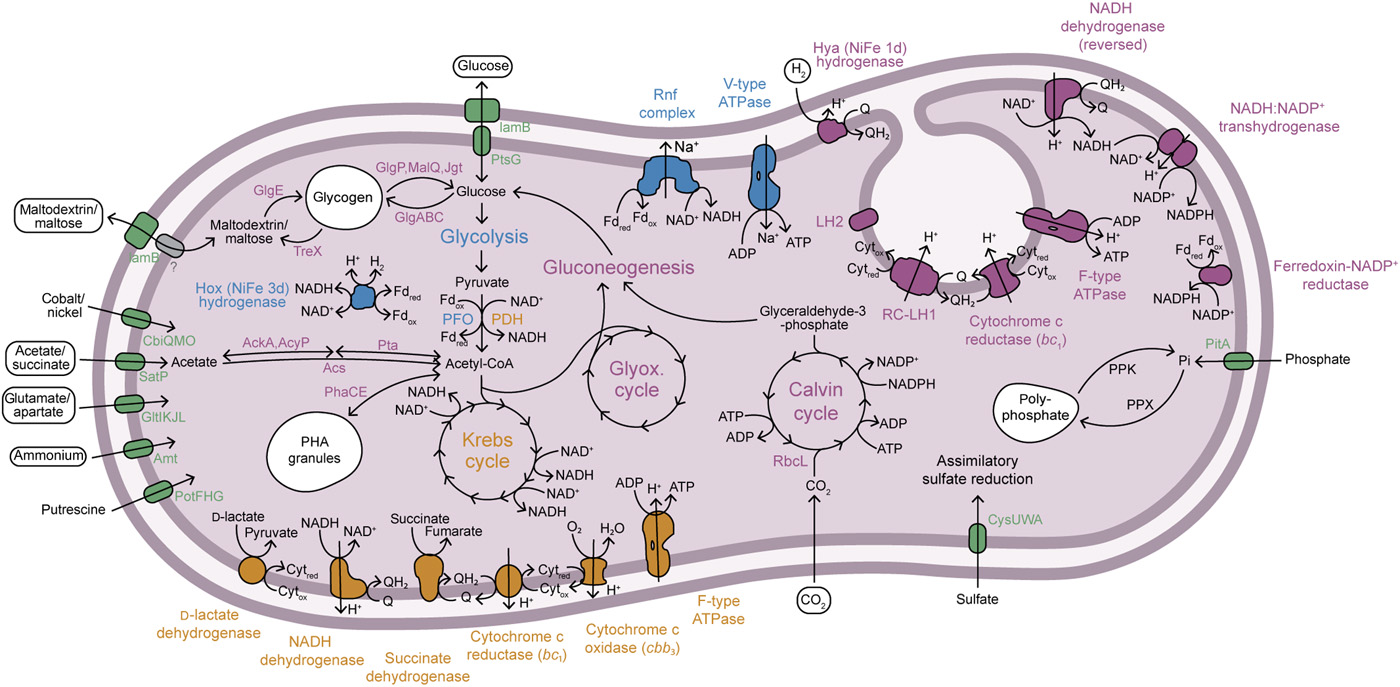
Inferred metabolic pathways of "Ca. Thiodictyon intracellulare", an endosymbiotic purple bacterium. The circular bulge on the top right is the outline of a chromatophore, a vesicle where cyclic photophosphorylation occurs.

In bacterial photosynthesis, a single photosystem is used, and therefore is involved in cyclic photophosphorylation. It is favored in anaerobic conditions and conditions of high irradiance and CO_{2} compensation points.

== Non-cyclic photophosphorylation ==
The other pathway, non-cyclic photophosphorylation, is a two-stage process involving two different chlorophyll photosystems in the thylakoid membrane. First, a photon is absorbed by chlorophyll pigments surrounding the reaction core center of photosystem II. The light excites an electron in the pigment P680 at the core of photosystem II, which is transferred to the primary electron acceptor, pheophytin, leaving behind P680^{+}. The energy of P680^{+} is used in two steps to split a water molecule into 2H^{+} + 1/2 O_{2} + 2e^{-} (photolysis or light-splitting). An electron from the water molecule reduces P680^{+} back to P680, while the H^{+} and oxygen are released. The electron transfers from pheophytin to plastoquinone (PQ), which takes 2e^{-} (in two steps) from pheophytin, and two H^{+} Ions from the stroma to form PQH_{2}. This plastoquinol is later oxidized back to PQ, releasing the 2e^{-} to the cytochrome b_{6}f complex and the two H^{+} ions into the thylakoid lumen. The electrons then pass through Cyt b_{6} and Cyt f to plastocyanin, using energy from photosystem I to pump hydrogen ions (H^{+}) into the thylakoid space. This creates a H^{+} gradient, making H^{+} ions flow back into the stroma of the chloroplast, providing the energy for the (re)generation of ATP.

The photosystem II complex replaced its lost electrons from H_{2}O, so electrons are not returned to photosystem II as they would in the analogous cyclic pathway. Instead, they are transferred to the photosystem I complex, which boosts their energy to a higher level using a second solar photon. The excited electrons are transferred to a series of acceptor molecules, but this time are passed on to an enzyme called ferredoxin-NADP^{+} reductase, which uses them to catalyze the reaction

NADP^{+} + 2H^{+} + 2e^{-} → NADPH + H^{+}

This consumes the H^{+} ions produced by the splitting of water, leading to a net production of 1/2O_{2}, ATP, and NADPH + H^{+} with the consumption of solar photons and water.

The concentration of NADPH in the chloroplast may help regulate which pathway electrons take through the light reactions. When the chloroplast runs low on ATP for the Calvin cycle, NADPH will accumulate and the plant may shift from noncyclic to cyclic electron flow.

== Early history of research ==
In 1950, first experimental evidence for the existence of photophosphorylation in vivo was presented by Otto Kandler using intact Chlorella cells and interpreting his findings as light-dependent ATP formation. In 1954, Daniel I. Arnon et.al. discovered photophosphorylation in vitro in isolated chloroplasts with the help of P^{32}. His first review on the early research of photophosphorylation was published in 1956.

== Sources ==
- Professor Luis Gordillo
- Fenchel T, King GM, Blackburn TH. Bacterial Biogeochemistry: The Ecophysiology of Mineral Cycling. 2nd ed. Elsevier; 1998.
- Lengeler JW, Drews G, Schlegel HG, editors. Biology of the Prokaryotes. Blackwell Sci; 1999.
- Nelson DL, Cox MM. Lehninger Principles of Biochemistry. 4th ed. Freeman; 2005.
- Nicholls, David G.; Ferguson, Stuart J. (2013). Bioenergetics (Fourth ed.). Amsterdam. ISBN 978-0-12-388431-2. OCLC 846495013.
- Stumm W, Morgan JJ. Aquatic Chemistry. 3rd ed. Wiley; 1996.
- Thauer RK, Jungermann K, Decker K. Energy Conservation in Chemotrophic Anaerobic Bacteria. Bacteriol. Rev. 41:100–180; 1977.
- White D. The Physiology and Biochemistry of Prokaryotes. 2nd ed. Oxford University Press; 2000.
- Voet D, Voet JG. Biochemistry. 3rd ed. Wiley; 2004.
