= Biological process =

Any function vital to living organisms

A biological process is a process necessary for an organism to live, and therefore shapes its capacity to interact with its environment. Biological processes are made of many chemical reactions or other events that are involved in the persistence and transformation of life forms.

== Regulation ==
Regulation of biological processes occurs when any process is modulated in its frequency, rate or extent. Biological processes are regulated by many means; examples include the control of gene expression, protein modification or interaction with a protein or substrate molecule.

- Homeostasis: regulation of the internal environment to maintain a constant state; for example, sweating to reduce temperature
- Organization: being structurally composed of one or more cells – the basic units of life
- Metabolism: transformation of energy by converting chemicals and energy into cellular components (anabolism) and decomposing organic matter (catabolism). Living things require energy to maintain internal organization (homeostasis) and to produce the other phenomena associated with life.
- Growth: maintenance of a higher rate of anabolism than catabolism. A growing organism increases in size in all of its parts, rather than simply accumulating matter.
- Response to stimuli: a response can take many forms, from the contraction of a unicellular organism to external chemicals, to complex reactions involving all the senses of multicellular organisms. A response is often expressed by motion; for example, the leaves of a plant turning toward the sun (phototropism), and chemotaxis.
- Interaction between organisms. the processes by which an organism has an observable effect on another organism of the same or different species.
- Adaptation: the ability to change over time in response to the environment. This ability is fundamental to the process of evolution and is determined by the organism's heredity, diet, and external factors.
- Also: cellular differentiation, fermentation, fertilisation, germination, tropism, hybridisation, metamorphosis, morphogenesis, photosynthesis, transpiration.

== List of biological processes in humans ==
- Breathing
- Defecation
- Drinking
- Eating
- Ejaculation
- Perspiration
- Urination
- Sleeping

== See also ==
- Cellular process
- Chemical process
- Life
- Organic reaction
