= Light-harvesting complex =

Protein-pigment complex

In biology, a light-harvesting complex, LHC, or antennae complex is an aggregate consisting of proteins bound with chromophores (chlorophylls and carotenoids) that play a key role in photosynthesis. They are one part of a photosystem, together with a reaction center. LHCs are arrayed around photosynthetic reaction centers in both plants and photosynthetic bacteria and collect more of the incoming light than would be captured by the reaction centers alone. The light captured by the chromophores excites molecules from their ground states to (short-lived) higher-energy states, known as the excited states. This energy is then focused toward the reaction centers by Förster resonance energy transfer.

Light-harvesting complexes are found in a wide variety among the different photosynthetic species, with no homology among the major groups.

== Function ==
Photosynthesis is a process where light is absorbed or harvested by pigment protein complexes which are able to turn sunlight into chemical energy. In this process, a molecule of the pigment protein absorbs a photon of sunlight, leading to electronic excitation delivered to the reaction centre where the process of charge separation can take place if the energy of the absorbed photon matches that of an electronic transition. The result of such excitation can be a return to the ground state or to another electronic state of the same molecule. When the excited molecule has a nearby neighbour molecule, the excitation energy may also be transferred, through electromagnetic interactions, from one molecule to another. This process is called resonance energy transfer, and the rate depends strongly on the distance between the energy donor and energy acceptor molecules. Before an excited molecule can transition back to its ground state, energy needs to be harvested. This excitation is transferred among chromophores where it is delivered to the reaction centre. Light-harvesting complexes have their pigments specifically positioned to optimize these rates.

== In purple bacteria ==
Purple bacteria are a type of photosynthetic organism with a light harvesting complex consisting of two pigment protein complexes, referred to as LH1 and LH2. Within the photosynthetic membrane, these two complexes differ in their arrangement. The LH1 complexes surround the reaction centre, while the LH2 complexes are arranged peripherally around the LH1 complexes and the reaction centre. Purple bacteria use bacteriochlorophyll and carotenoids to gather light energy. These proteins are arranged in a ring-like fashion, creating a cylinder that spans the membrane.

== In green bacteria ==
The main light harvesting complex in Green bacteria is known as the chlorosome. The chlorosome is equipped with rod-like BChl c aggregates with protein embedded lipids surrounding it. Chlorosomes are found outside of the membrane which covers the reaction centre. Green sulphur bacteria and some Chloroflexia use ellipsoidal complexes known as the chlorosome to capture light. Their form of bacteriochlorophyll is green.

== In cyanobacteria and plants ==
Chlorophylls and carotenoids are important in light-harvesting complexes present in plants. Chlorophyll b is almost identical to chlorophyll a, except it has a formyl group in place of a methyl group. This small difference makes chlorophyll b absorb light with wavelengths between 400 and 500 nm more efficiently. Carotenoids are long linear organic molecules that have alternating single and double bonds along their length. Such molecules are called polyenes. Two examples of carotenoids are lycopene and β-carotene. These molecules also absorb light most efficiently in the 400 – 500 nm range. Due to their absorption region, carotenoids appear red and yellow and provide most of the red and yellow colours present in fruits and flowers.

The carotenoid molecules also serve a safeguarding function. Carotenoid molecules suppress damaging photochemical reactions, in particular those including oxygen, which exposure to sunlight can cause. Plants that lack carotenoid molecules quickly die upon exposure to oxygen and light.

== Phycobilisome ==
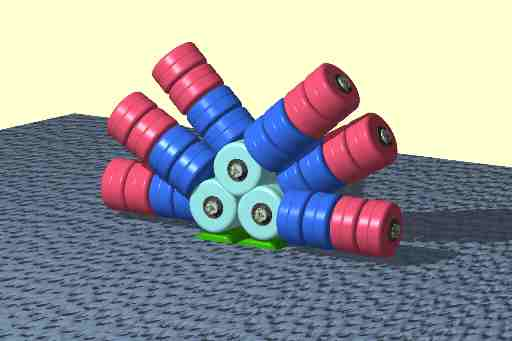
Schematic layout of protein subunits in a phycobilisome.

The antenna-shaped light harvesting complex of cyanobacteria, glaucocystophyta, and red algae is known as the phycobilisome; it is composed of linear tetrapyrrole pigments. Pigment-protein complexes, referred to as R-phycoerythrin, are rod-like in shape and make up the rods and core of the phycobilisome. Little light reaches algae that reside at a depth of one meter or more in seawater, as light is absorbed by seawater. The pigments, such as phycocyanobilin and phycoerythrobilin, are the chromophores that bind through a covalent thioether bond to their apoproteins at cystein residues. The apoprotein with its chromophore is called phycocyanin, phycoerythrin, and allophycocyanin, respectively. They often occur as hexamers of α and β subunits (α_{3}β_{3})_{2}. They enhance the amount and spectral window of light absorption and fill the "green gap", which occurs in higher plants.

The geometrical arrangement of a phycobilisome is very elegant and results in 95% efficiency of energy transfer. There is a central core of allophycocyanin, which sits above a photosynthetic reaction center. There are phycocyanin and phycoerythrin subunits that radiate out from this center like thin tubes. This increases the surface area of the absorbing section and helps focus and concentrate light energy down into the reaction center to form chlorophyll. The energy transfer from excited electrons absorbed by pigments in the phycoerythrin subunits at the periphery of these antennas appears at the reaction center in less than 100 ps.

== See also ==
- Photosynthesis
- Photosynthetic reaction center
- Photosystem II light-harvesting protein
- Light harvesting pigment
