= Photosynthetic pigment =

Type of molecule

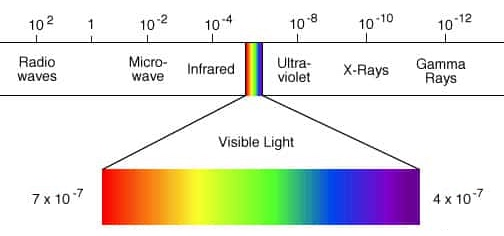
Electromagnetic spectrum – wavelengths in metres

A photosynthetic pigment (accessory pigment; chloroplast pigment; antenna pigment) is a pigment that is present in chloroplasts or photosynthetic bacteria and captures the light energy necessary for photosynthesis.

List of photosynthetic pigments (in order of increasing polarity):

- Carotene: an orange pigment
- Xanthophyll: a yellow pigment
- Phaeophytin a: a gray-brown pigment
- Phaeophytin b: a yellow-brown pigment
- Chlorophyll a: a blue-green pigment
- Chlorophyll b: a yellow-green pigment

Chlorophyll a is the most common of the six, present in every plant that performs photosynthesis. Each pigment absorbs light more efficiently in a different part of the electromagnetic spectrum. Chlorophyll a absorbs well in the ranges of 400–450 nm and at 650–700 nm; chlorophyll b at 450–500 nm and at 600–650 nm. Xanthophyll absorbs well at 400–530 nm. However, none of the pigments absorb well in the green-yellow region; the diffuse reflection of the unabsorbed green light is responsible for the abundant green seen in nature.

== Bacteria ==
Like plants, the cyanobacteria use water as an electron donor for photosynthesis and therefore liberate oxygen; they also use chlorophyll as a pigment. In addition, most cyanobacteria use phycobiliproteins, water-soluble pigments which occur in the cytoplasm of the chloroplast, to capture light energy and pass it on to the chlorophylls. (Some cyanobacteria, the prochlorophytes, use chlorophyll b instead of phycobilin.) It is thought that the chloroplasts in plants and algae all evolved from cyanobacteria.

Several other groups of bacteria use the bacteriochlorophyll pigments (similar to the chlorophylls) for photosynthesis. Unlike the cyanobacteria, these bacteria do not produce oxygen; they typically use hydrogen sulfide rather than water as the electron donor.

Recently, a very different pigment has been found in some marine Gammaproteobacteria: proteorhodopsin. It is similar to and probably originated from bacteriorhodopsin (see below: under #Archaea).

== Archaea ==
Halobacteria use the pigment bacteriorhodopsin which acts directly as a proton pump when exposed to light.
