= Photosynthesis =

Biological process to convert light into chemical energy

Schematic of photosynthesis in plants. The carbohydrates produced are stored in or used by the plant.

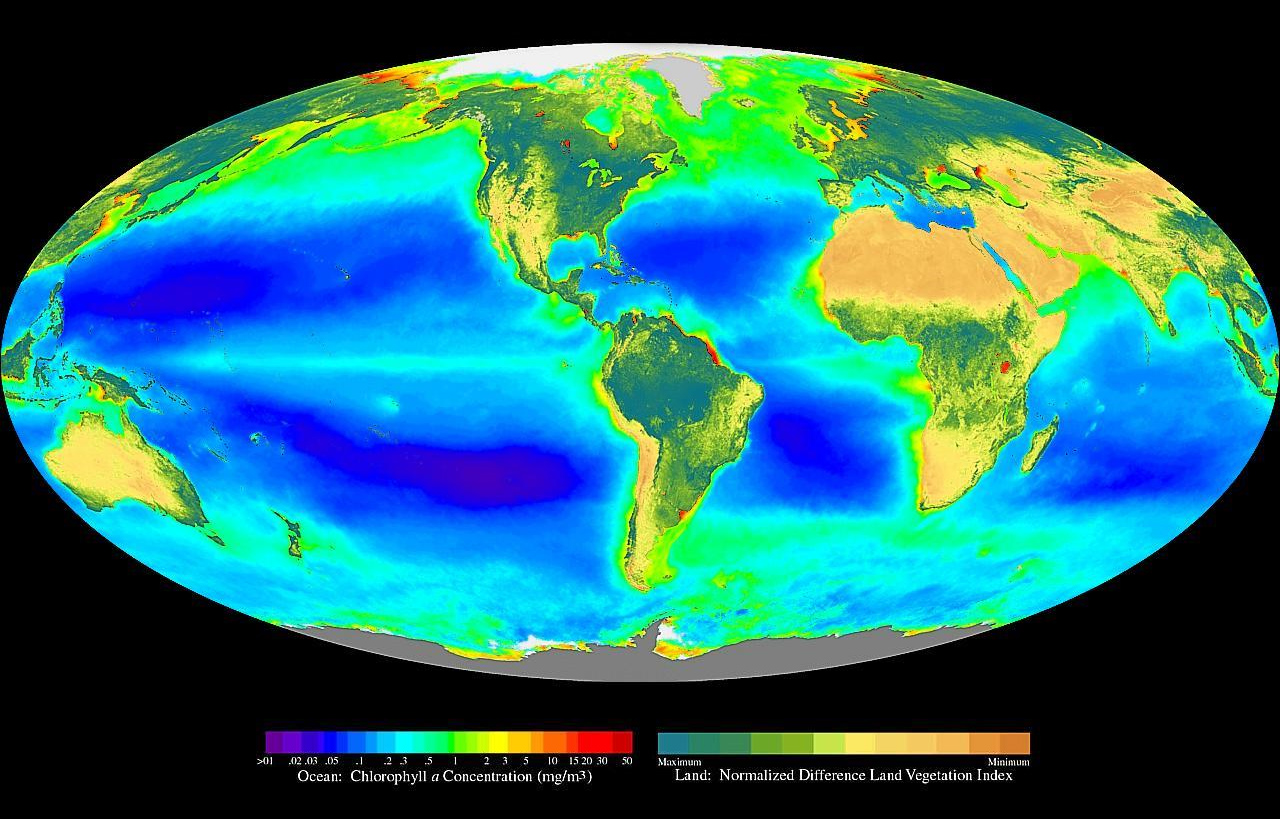
Composite image showing the global distribution of photosynthesis, including both oceanic phytoplankton and terrestrial vegetation. Dark red and blue-green indicate regions of high photosynthetic activity in the ocean and on land, respectively.

Photosynthesis (Note: /ˌfoʊtoʊˈsɪnθəsɪs, ˌfoʊtə-/ FOH-toh-SINTH-ə-sis, FOH-tə-) is a system of biological processes by which photopigment-bearing autotrophic organisms, such as most plants, algae and cyanobacteria, convert light energy—typically from sunlight—into the chemical energy necessary to fuel their metabolism. The term photosynthesis usually refers to oxygenic photosynthesis, a process that releases oxygen as a byproduct of water splitting. Photosynthetic organisms store the converted chemical energy within the bonds of intracellular organic compounds (complex compounds containing carbon), typically carbohydrates like sugars (mainly glucose, fructose and sucrose), starches, phytoglycogen and cellulose. When needing to use this stored energy, an organism's cells then metabolize the organic compounds through cellular respiration. Photosynthesis plays a critical role in producing and maintaining the oxygen content of the Earth's atmosphere, and it supplies most of the biological energy necessary for complex life on Earth.

Some organisms also perform anoxygenic photosynthesis, which does not produce oxygen. Some bacteria (e.g. purple bacteria) use bacteriochlorophyll to split hydrogen sulfide as a reductant instead of water, releasing sulfur instead of oxygen, which was a dominant form of photosynthesis in the euxinic Canfield oceans during the Boring Billion. Archaea such as Halobacterium also perform a type of non-carbon-fixing anoxygenic photosynthesis, where the simpler photopigment retinal and its microbial rhodopsin derivatives are used to absorb green light and produce a proton (hydron) gradient across the cell membrane, and the subsequent ion movement powers transmembrane proton pumps to directly synthesize adenosine triphosphate (ATP), the "energy currency" of cells. Such archaeal photosynthesis might have been the earliest form of photosynthesis that evolved on Earth, as far back as the Paleoarchean, preceding that of cyanobacteria (see Purple Earth hypothesis).

While the details may differ between species, the process always begins when light energy is absorbed by the reaction centers, proteins that contain photosynthetic pigments or chromophores. In plants, these pigments are chlorophylls (a porphyrin derivative that absorbs the red and blue spectra of light, thus reflecting green) held inside chloroplasts, abundant in leaf cells. In cyanobacteria, they are embedded in the plasma membrane. In these light-dependent reactions, some energy is used to strip electrons from suitable substances, such as water, producing oxygen gas. The hydrogen freed by the splitting of water is used in the creation of two important molecules that participate in energetic processes: reduced nicotinamide adenine dinucleotide phosphate (NADPH) and ATP.

In plants, algae, and cyanobacteria, sugars are synthesized by a subsequent sequence of light-independent reactions called the Calvin cycle. In this process, atmospheric carbon dioxide is incorporated into already existing organic compounds, such as ribulose bisphosphate (RuBP). Using the ATP and NADPH produced by the light-dependent reactions, the resulting compounds are then reduced and removed to form further carbohydrates, such as glucose. In other bacteria, different mechanisms like the reverse Krebs cycle are used to achieve the same end.

The first photosynthetic organisms probably evolved early in the evolutionary history of life using reducing agents such as hydrogen or hydrogen sulfide, rather than water, as sources of electrons. Cyanobacteria appeared later; the excess oxygen they produced contributed directly to the oxygenation of the Earth, which rendered the evolution of complex life possible. The average rate of energy captured by global photosynthesis is approximately 130 terawatts, which is about eight times the total power consumption of human civilization. Photosynthetic organisms also convert around 100–115 billion tons (91–104 Pg petagrams, or billions of metric tons), of carbon into biomass per year. Photosynthesis was discovered in 1779 by Jan Ingenhousz who showed that plants need light, not just soil and water.

== Overview ==
Photosynthesis changes sunlight into chemical energy, splits water to liberate O_{2}, and fixes CO_{2} into sugar.

Most photosynthetic organisms are photoautotrophs, which means that they are able to synthesize food directly from carbon dioxide and water using energy from light. However, not all organisms use carbon dioxide as a source of carbon atoms to carry out photosynthesis; photoheterotrophs use organic compounds, rather than carbon dioxide, as a source of carbon.

In plants, algae, and cyanobacteria, photosynthesis releases oxygen. This oxygenic photosynthesis is by far the most common type of photosynthesis used by living organisms. Some shade-loving plants (sciophytes) produce such low levels of oxygen during photosynthesis that they use all of it themselves instead of releasing it to the atmosphere.

Although there are some differences between oxygenic photosynthesis in plants, algae, and cyanobacteria, the overall process is quite similar in these organisms. There are also many varieties of anoxygenic photosynthesis, used mostly by bacteria, which consume carbon dioxide but do not release oxygen or which produce elemental sulfur instead of molecular oxygen.

Carbon dioxide is converted into sugars in a process called carbon fixation; photosynthesis captures energy from sunlight to convert carbon dioxide into carbohydrates. Carbon fixation is an endothermic redox reaction. In general outline, photosynthesis is the opposite of cellular respiration: while photosynthesis is a process of reduction of carbon dioxide to carbohydrates, cellular respiration is the oxidation of carbohydrates or other nutrients to carbon dioxide. Nutrients used in cellular respiration include carbohydrates, amino acids and fatty acids. These nutrients are oxidized to produce carbon dioxide and water, and to release chemical energy to drive the organism's metabolism.

Photosynthesis and cellular respiration are distinct processes, as they take place through different sequences of chemical reactions and in different cellular compartments (cellular respiration in mitochondria).

The general equation for photosynthesis as first proposed by Cornelis van Niel is:

+ + → + +

Since water is used as the electron donor in oxygenic photosynthesis, the equation for this process is:

+ + → + +

This equation emphasizes that water is both a reactant in the light-dependent reaction and a product of the light-independent reaction, but canceling n water molecules from each side gives the net equation:

+ + → +

Other processes substitute other compounds (such as arsenite) for water in the electron-supply role; for example some microbes use sunlight to oxidize arsenite to arsenate: The equation for this reaction is:

+ + → + (used to build other compounds in subsequent reactions)

Photosynthesis occurs in two stages. In the first stage, light-dependent reactions or light reactions capture the energy of light and use it to make the hydrogen carrier NADPH and the energy-storage molecule ATP. During the second stage, the light-independent reactions use these products to capture and reduce carbon dioxide.

Most organisms that use oxygenic photosynthesis use visible light for the light-dependent reactions, although at least three use shortwave infrared or, more specifically, far-red radiation.

Some organisms employ even more radical variants of photosynthesis. Some archaea use a simpler method that employs a pigment similar to those used for vision in animals. The bacteriorhodopsin changes its configuration in response to sunlight, acting as a proton pump. This produces a proton gradient more directly, which is then converted to chemical energy. The process does not involve carbon dioxide fixation and does not release oxygen, and seems to have evolved separately from the more common types of photosynthesis.

== Photosynthetic membranes and organelles ==
Chloroplast ultrastructure: 1. outer membrane; 2. intermembrane space; 3. inner membrane (1+2+3: envelope); 4. stroma (aqueous fluid); 5. thylakoid lumen (inside of thylakoid); 6. thylakoid membrane; 7. granum (stack of thylakoids); 8. thylakoid (lamella); 9. starch; 10. ribosome; 11. plastidial DNA; 12. plastoglobule (drop of lipids)

In photosynthetic bacteria, the proteins that gather light for photosynthesis are embedded in cell membranes. In its simplest form, this involves the membrane surrounding the cell itself. However, the membrane may be tightly folded into cylindrical sheets called thylakoids, or bunched up into round vesicles called intracytoplasmic membranes. These structures can fill most of the interior of a cell, giving the membrane a very large surface area and therefore increasing the amount of light that the bacteria can absorb.

In plants and algae, photosynthesis takes place in organelles called chloroplasts. A typical plant cell contains about 10 to 100 chloroplasts. The chloroplast is enclosed by a membrane. This membrane is composed of a phospholipid inner membrane, a phospholipid outer membrane, and an intermembrane space. Enclosed by the membrane is an aqueous fluid called the stroma. Embedded within the stroma are stacks of thylakoids (grana), which are the site of photosynthesis. The thylakoids appear as flattened disks. The thylakoid itself is enclosed by the thylakoid membrane, and within the enclosed volume is a lumen or thylakoid space. Embedded in the thylakoid membrane are integral and peripheral membrane protein complexes of the photosynthetic system.

Plants absorb light primarily using the pigment chlorophyll. The green part of the light spectrum is not absorbed but is reflected, which is the reason that most plants have a green color. Besides chlorophyll, plants also use pigments such as carotenes and xanthophylls. Algae also use chlorophyll, but various other pigments are present, such as phycocyanin, carotenes, and xanthophylls in green algae, phycoerythrin in red algae (rhodophytes) and fucoxanthin in brown algae and diatoms resulting in a wide variety of colors.

These pigments are embedded in plants and algae in complexes called antenna proteins. In such proteins, the pigments are arranged to work together. Such a combination of proteins is also called a light-harvesting complex.

Although all cells in the green parts of a plant have chloroplasts, the majority of those are found in specially adapted structures called leaves. Certain species adapted to conditions of strong sunlight and aridity, such as many Euphorbia and cactus species, have their main photosynthetic organs in their stems. The cells in the interior tissues of a leaf, called the mesophyll, can contain between 450,000 and 800,000 chloroplasts for every square millimeter of leaf. The surface of the leaf is coated with a water-resistant waxy cuticle that protects the leaf from excessive evaporation of water and decreases the absorption of ultraviolet or blue light to minimize heating. The transparent epidermis layer allows light to pass through to the palisade mesophyll cells where most of the photosynthesis takes place.

== Light-dependent reactions ==
Light-dependent reactions of photosynthesis at the thylakoid membrane

In the light-dependent reactions, one molecule of the pigment chlorophyll absorbs one photon and loses one electron. This electron is taken up by a modified form of chlorophyll called pheophytin, which passes the electron to a quinone molecule, starting the flow of electrons down an electron transport chain that leads to the ultimate reduction of NADP to NADPH. In addition, this creates a proton gradient (energy gradient) across the chloroplast membrane, which is used by ATP synthase in the synthesis of ATP. The chlorophyll molecule ultimately regains the electron it lost when a water molecule is split in a process called photolysis, which releases oxygen.

The overall equation for the light-dependent reactions under the conditions of non-cyclic electron flow in green plants is:

2 H_{2}O + 2 NADP^{+} + 3 ADP + 3 P_{i} + light → 2 NADPH + 2 H^{+} + 3 ATP + O_{2}

Not all wavelengths of light can support photosynthesis. The photosynthetic action spectrum depends on the type of accessory pigments present. For example, in green plants, the action spectrum resembles the absorption spectrum for chlorophylls and carotenoids with absorption peaks in violet-blue and red light. In red algae, the action spectrum is blue-green light, which allows these algae to use the blue end of the spectrum to grow in the deeper waters that filter out the longer wavelengths (red light) used by above-ground green plants. The non-absorbed part of the light spectrum is what gives photosynthetic organisms their color (e.g., green plants, red algae, purple bacteria) and is the least effective for photosynthesis in the respective organisms.

=== Z scheme ===
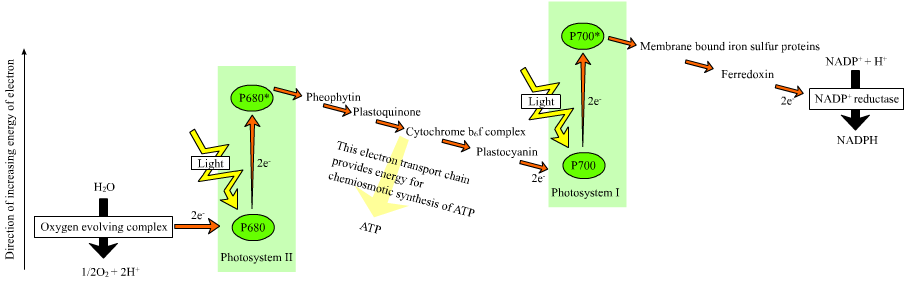
The "Z scheme"

In plants, light-dependent reactions occur in the thylakoid membranes of the chloroplasts where they drive the synthesis of ATP and NADPH. The light-dependent reactions are of two forms: cyclic and non-cyclic.

In the non-cyclic reaction, the photons are captured in the light-harvesting antenna complexes of photosystem II by chlorophyll and other accessory pigments (see diagram "Z-scheme"). The absorption of a photon by the antenna complex loosens an electron by a process called photoinduced charge separation. The antenna system is at the core of the chlorophyll molecule of the photosystem II reaction center. That loosened electron is taken up by the primary electron-acceptor molecule, pheophytin. As the electrons are shuttled through an electron transport chain (the so-called Z-scheme shown in the diagram), a chemiosmotic potential is generated by pumping proton cations (H^{+}) across the membrane and into the thylakoid space. An ATP synthase enzyme uses that chemiosmotic potential to make ATP during photophosphorylation, whereas NADPH is a product of the terminal redox reaction in the Z-scheme. The electron enters a chlorophyll molecule in Photosystem I. There it is further excited by the light absorbed by that photosystem. The electron is then passed along a chain of electron acceptors to which it transfers some of its energy. The energy delivered to the electron acceptors is used to move hydrogen ions across the thylakoid membrane into the lumen. The electron is eventually used to reduce the coenzyme NADP with an H^{+} to NADPH (which has functions in the light-independent reaction); at that point, the path of that electron ends.

The cyclic reaction is similar to that of the non-cyclic but differs in that it generates only ATP, and no reduced NADP (NADPH) is created. The cyclic reaction takes place only at photosystem I. Once the electron is displaced from the photosystem, the electron is passed down the electron acceptor molecules and returns to photosystem I, from where it was emitted, hence the name cyclic reaction.

=== Water photolysis ===
Linear electron transport through a photosystem will leave the reaction center of that photosystem oxidized. Elevating another electron will first require re-reduction of the reaction center. The excited electrons lost from the reaction center (P700) of photosystem I are replaced by transfer from plastocyanin, whose electrons come from electron transport through photosystem II. Photosystem II, as the first step of the Z-scheme, requires an external source of electrons to reduce its oxidized chlorophyll a reaction center. The source of electrons for photosynthesis in green plants and cyanobacteria is water. Two water molecules are oxidized by the energy of four successive charge-separation reactions of photosystem II to yield a molecule of diatomic oxygen and four hydrogen ions. The electrons yielded are transferred to a redox-active tyrosine residue that is oxidized by the energy of P680^{+}. This resets the ability of P680 to absorb another photon and release another photo-dissociated electron. The oxidation of water is catalyzed in photosystem II by a redox-active structure that contains four manganese ions and a calcium ion; this oxygen-evolving complex binds two water molecules and contains the four oxidizing equivalents that are used to drive the water-oxidizing reaction (Kok's S-state diagrams). The hydrogen ions are released in the thylakoid lumen and therefore contribute to the transmembrane chemiosmotic potential that leads to ATP synthesis. Oxygen is a waste product of light-dependent reactions, but the majority of organisms on Earth use oxygen and its energy for cellular respiration, including photosynthetic organisms.

== Light-independent reactions ==
=== Calvin cycle ===
In the light-independent (or "dark") reactions, the enzyme RuBisCO captures CO_{2} from the atmosphere and, in a process called the Calvin cycle, uses the newly formed NADPH and releases three-carbon sugars, which are later combined to form sucrose and starch. The overall equation for the light-independent reactions in green plants is

3 CO_{2} + 9 ATP + 6 NADPH + 6 H^{+} → C_{3}H_{6}O_{3}-phosphate + 9 ADP + 8 P_{i} + 6 NADP^{+} + 3 H_{2}O

Overview of the Calvin cycle and carbon fixation

Carbon fixation produces the three-carbon sugar intermediate, which is then converted into the final carbohydrate products. The simple carbon sugars photosynthesis produces are then used to form other organic compounds, such as the building material cellulose, the precursors for lipid and amino acid biosynthesis, or as a fuel in cellular respiration. The latter occurs not only in plants but also in animals when the carbon and energy from plants is passed through a food chain.

The fixation or reduction of carbon dioxide is a process in which carbon dioxide combines with a five-carbon sugar, ribulose 1,5-bisphosphate, to yield two molecules of a three-carbon compound, glycerate 3-phosphate, also known as 3-phosphoglycerate. Glycerate 3-phosphate, in the presence of ATP and NADPH produced during the light-dependent stages, is reduced to glyceraldehyde 3-phosphate. This product is also referred to as 3-phosphoglyceraldehyde (PGAL) or, more generically, as triose phosphate. Most (five out of six molecules) of the glyceraldehyde 3-phosphate produced are used to regenerate ribulose 1,5-bisphosphate so the process can continue. The triose phosphates not thus "recycled" often condense to form hexose phosphates, which ultimately yield sucrose, starch, and cellulose, as well as glucose and fructose. The sugars produced during carbon metabolism yield carbon skeletons that can be used for other metabolic reactions like the production of amino acids and lipids.

=== Carbon concentrating mechanisms ===
==== On land ====
Overview of C4 carbon fixation. (This image mistakenly shows lactic acid instead of pyruvate, and all the species ending in "-ate" are shown as unionized acids, such as malic acid and so on).

In hot and dry conditions, plants close their stomata to prevent water loss. Under these conditions, CO_{2} will decrease and oxygen gas, produced by the light reactions of photosynthesis, will increase, causing an increase of photorespiration by the oxygenase activity of ribulose-1,5-bisphosphate carboxylase/oxygenase (RuBisCO) and decrease in carbon fixation. Some plants have evolved mechanisms to increase the CO_{2} concentration in the leaves under these conditions.

Plants that use the C_{4} carbon fixation process chemically fix carbon dioxide in the cells of the mesophyll by adding it to the three-carbon molecule phosphoenolpyruvate (PEP), a reaction catalyzed by an enzyme called PEP carboxylase, creating the four-carbon organic acid oxaloacetic acid. Oxaloacetic acid or malate synthesized by this process is then translocated to specialized bundle sheath cells where the enzyme RuBisCO and other Calvin cycle enzymes are located, and where CO_{2} released by decarboxylation of the four-carbon acids is then fixed by RuBisCO activity to the three-carbon 3-phosphoglyceric acids. The physical separation of RuBisCO from the oxygen-generating light reactions reduces photorespiration and increases CO_{2} fixation and, thus, the photosynthetic capacity of the leaf. C_{4} plants can produce more sugar than C_{3} plants in conditions of high light and temperature. Many important crop plants are C_{4} plants, including maize, sorghum, sugarcane, and millet. Plants that do not use PEP-carboxylase in carbon fixation are called C_{3} plants because the primary carboxylation reaction, catalyzed by RuBisCO, produces the three-carbon 3-phosphoglyceric acids directly in the Calvin-Benson cycle. Over 90% of plants use C_{3} carbon fixation, compared to 3% that use C_{4} carbon fixation; however, the evolution of C_{4} in over sixty plant lineages makes it a striking example of convergent evolution. C_{2} photosynthesis, which involves carbon-concentration by selective breakdown of photorespiratory glycine, is both an evolutionary precursor to C_{4} and a useful carbon-concentrating mechanism in its own right.

Xerophytes, such as cacti and most succulents, also use PEP carboxylase to capture carbon dioxide in a process called Crassulacean acid metabolism (CAM). In contrast to C_{4} metabolism, which spatially separates the CO_{2} fixation to PEP from the Calvin cycle, CAM temporally separates these two processes. CAM plants have a different leaf anatomy from C_{3} plants, and fix the CO_{2} at night, when their stomata are open. CAM plants store the CO_{2} mostly in the form of malic acid via carboxylation of phosphoenolpyruvate to oxaloacetate, which is then reduced to malate. Decarboxylation of malate during the day releases CO_{2} inside the leaves, thus allowing carbon fixation to 3-phosphoglycerate by RuBisCO. CAM is used by 16,000 species of plants.

Calcium-oxalate-accumulating plants, such as Amaranthus hybridus and Colobanthus quitensis, show a variation of photosynthesis where calcium oxalate crystals function as dynamic carbon pools, supplying carbon dioxide (CO_{2}) to photosynthetic cells when stomata are partially or totally closed. This process was named alarm photosynthesis. Under stress conditions (e.g., water deficit), oxalate released from calcium oxalate crystals is converted to CO_{2} by an oxalate oxidase enzyme, and the produced CO_{2} can support the Calvin cycle reactions. Reactive hydrogen peroxide (H_{2}O_{2}), the byproduct of oxalate oxidase reaction, can be neutralized by catalase. Alarm photosynthesis represents a photosynthetic variant to be added to the well-known C4 and CAM pathways. However, alarm photosynthesis, in contrast to these pathways, operates as a biochemical pump that collects carbon from the organ interior (or from the soil) and not from the atmosphere.

==== In water ====
Cyanobacteria possess carboxysomes, which increase the concentration of CO_{2} around RuBisCO to increase the rate of photosynthesis. An enzyme, carbonic anhydrase, located within the carboxysome, releases CO_{2} from dissolved hydrocarbonate ions (HCO^{−}_{3}). Before the CO_{2} can diffuse out, RuBisCO concentrated within the carboxysome quickly sponges it up. HCO^{−}_{3} ions are made from CO_{2} outside the cell by another carbonic anhydrase and are actively pumped into the cell by a membrane protein. They cannot cross the membrane as they are charged, and within the cytosol they turn back into CO_{2} very slowly without the help of carbonic anhydrase. This causes the HCO^{−}_{3} ions to accumulate within the cell from where they diffuse into the carboxysomes. Pyrenoids in algae and hornworts also act to concentrate CO_{2} around RuBisCO.

== Order and kinetics ==
The overall process of photosynthesis takes place in four stages:

Stage	Event	Site	Time scale
1	Energy transfer in antenna chlorophyll	Thylakoid membranes in the chloroplasts	Femtosecond to picosecond
2	Transfer of electrons in photochemical reactions	Thylakoid membranes in the chloroplasts	Picosecond to nanosecond
3	Electron transport chain and ATP synthesis	Thylakoid membranes in the chloroplasts	Microsecond to millisecond
4	Carbon fixation and export of stable products	Stroma of the chloroplasts and the cell cytosol	Millisecond to second

== Efficiency ==
Plants usually convert light into chemical energy with a photosynthetic efficiency of 3–6%. Absorbed light that is unconverted is dissipated primarily as heat, with a small fraction (1–2%) reemitted as chlorophyll fluorescence at longer (redder) wavelengths. This fact allows measurement of the light reaction of photosynthesis by using chlorophyll fluorometers.

Actual plants' photosynthetic efficiency varies with the frequency of the light being converted, light intensity, temperature, and proportion of carbon dioxide in the atmosphere, and can vary from 0.1% to 8%. By comparison, solar panels convert light into electric energy at an efficiency of approximately 6–20% for mass-produced panels, and above 40% in laboratory devices. Scientists are studying photosynthesis in hopes of developing plants with increased yield.

The efficiency of both light and dark reactions can be measured, but the relationship between the two can be complex. For example, the light reaction creates ATP and NADPH energy molecules, which C_{3} plants can use for carbon fixation or photorespiration. Electrons may also flow to other electron sinks. For this reason, it is not uncommon for authors to differentiate between work done under non-photorespiratory conditions and under photorespiratory conditions.

Chlorophyll fluorescence of photosystem II can measure the light reaction, and infrared gas analyzers can measure the dark reaction. An integrated chlorophyll fluorometer and gas exchange system can investigate both light and dark reactions when researchers use the two separate systems together. Infrared gas analyzers and some moisture sensors are sensitive enough to measure the photosynthetic assimilation of CO_{2} and of ΔH_{2}O using reliable methods. CO_{2} is commonly measured in μmols/(m^{2}/s), parts per million, or volume per million; and H_{2}O is commonly measured in mmols/(m^{2}/s) or in mbars. By measuring CO_{2} assimilation, ΔH_{2}O, leaf temperature, barometric pressure, leaf area, and photosynthetically active radiation (PAR), it becomes possible to estimate, "A" or carbon assimilation, "E" or transpiration, "gs" or stomatal conductance, and "Ci" or intracellular CO_{2}. However, it is more common to use chlorophyll fluorescence for plant stress measurement, where appropriate, because the most commonly used parameters FV/FM and Y(II) or F/FM' can be measured in a few seconds, allowing the investigation of larger plant populations.

Gas exchange systems that offer control of CO_{2} levels, above and below ambient, allow the common practice of measurement of A/Ci curves, at different CO_{2} levels, to characterize a plant's photosynthetic response.

Integrated chlorophyll fluorometer – gas exchange systems allow a more precise measure of photosynthetic response and mechanisms. While standard gas exchange photosynthesis systems can measure Ci, or substomatal CO_{2} levels, the addition of integrated chlorophyll fluorescence measurements allows a more precise measurement of C_{C}, the estimation of CO_{2} concentration at the site of carboxylation in the chloroplast, to replace Ci. CO_{2} concentration in the chloroplast becomes possible to estimate with the measurement of mesophyll conductance or g_{m} using an integrated system.

Photosynthesis measurement systems are not designed to directly measure the amount of light the leaf absorbs, but analysis of chlorophyll fluorescence, P700- and P515-absorbance, and gas exchange measurements reveal detailed information about, e.g., the photosystems, quantum efficiency and the CO_{2} assimilation rates. With some instruments, even wavelength dependency of the photosynthetic efficiency can be analyzed.

A phenomenon known as quantum walk increases the efficiency of the energy transport of light significantly. In the photosynthetic cell of an alga, bacterium, or plant, there are light-sensitive molecules called chromophores arranged in an antenna-shaped structure called a photocomplex. When a photon is absorbed by a chromophore, it is converted into a quasiparticle referred to as an exciton, which jumps from chromophore to chromophore towards the reaction center of the photocomplex, a collection of molecules that traps its energy in a chemical form accessible to the cell's metabolism. The exciton's wave properties enable it to cover a wider area and try out several possible paths simultaneously, allowing it to instantaneously "choose" the most efficient route, where it will have the highest probability of arriving at its destination in the minimum possible time.

Because that quantum walking takes place at temperatures far higher than quantum phenomena usually occur, it is only possible over very short distances. Obstacles in the form of destructive interference cause the particle to lose its wave properties for an instant before it regains them once again after it is freed from its locked position through a classic "hop". The movement of the electron towards the photo center is therefore covered in a series of conventional hops and quantum walks.

== Evolution ==
Life timeline
← / Earth formed; ← / Earliest water; ← / LUCA; ← / Earliest fossils; ← / Great Oxygenation Event; ← / Sexual reproduction; ← / Earliest fungi; ← / Neoproterozoic oxygenation event; ← / Ediacaran biota; ← / Cambrian explosion; ← / Earliest tetrapods; ← / Earliest hominoid
(million years ago)

Fossils of what are thought to be filamentous photosynthetic organisms have been dated at 3.4 billion years old. More recent studies also suggest that photosynthesis may have begun about 3.4 billion years ago, though the first direct evidence of photosynthesis comes from thylakoid membranes preserved in 1.75-billion-year-old cherts.

Oxygenic photosynthesis is the main source of oxygen in the Earth's atmosphere, and its earliest appearance is sometimes referred to as the oxygen catastrophe. Geological evidence suggests that oxygenic photosynthesis, such as that in cyanobacteria, became important during the Paleoproterozoic era around two billion years ago. Modern photosynthesis in plants and most photosynthetic prokaryotes is oxygenic, using water as an electron donor, which is oxidized to molecular oxygen in the photosynthetic reaction center.

=== Symbiosis and the origin of chloroplasts ===
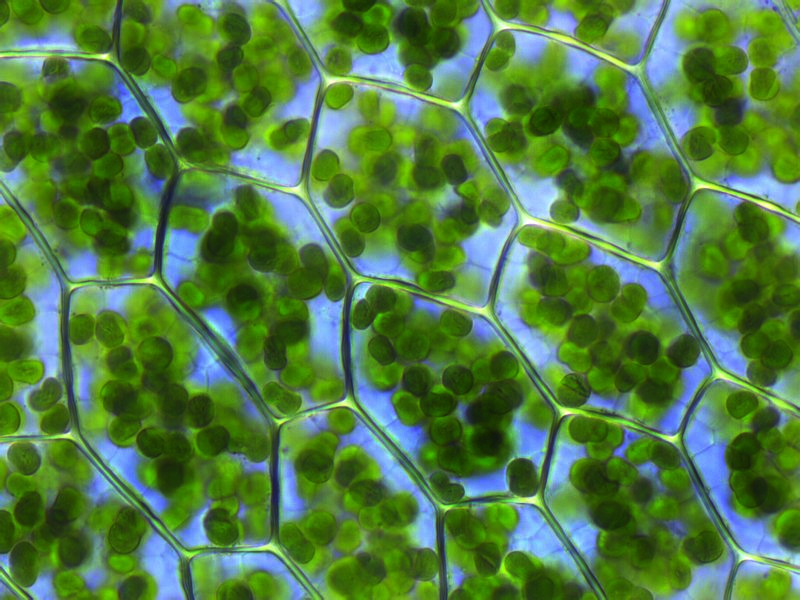
Plant cells with visible chloroplasts (from a moss, Plagiomnium affine)

Several groups of animals have formed symbiotic relationships with photosynthetic algae. These are most common in corals, sponges, and sea anemones. Scientists presume that this is due to the particularly simple body plans and large surface areas of these animals compared to their volumes. In addition, a few marine mollusks, such as Elysia viridis and Elysia chlorotica, also maintain a symbiotic relationship with chloroplasts they capture from the algae in their diet and then store in their bodies (see Kleptoplasty). This allows the mollusks to survive solely by photosynthesis for several months at a time. Some of the genes from the plant cell nucleus have even been transferred to the slugs, so that the chloroplasts can be supplied with proteins they need to survive.

An even closer form of symbiosis may explain the origin of chloroplasts. Chloroplasts have many similarities with photosynthetic bacteria, including a circular chromosome, prokaryotic-type ribosome, and similar proteins in the photosynthetic reaction center. The endosymbiotic theory suggests that photosynthetic bacteria were acquired (by endocytosis) by early eukaryotic cells to form the first plant cells. Therefore, chloroplasts may be photosynthetic bacteria that adapted to life inside plant cells. Like mitochondria, chloroplasts possess their own DNA, separate from the nuclear DNA of their plant host cells and the genes in this chloroplast DNA resemble those found in cyanobacteria. DNA in chloroplasts codes for redox proteins such as those found in the photosynthetic reaction centers. The CoRR Hypothesis proposes that this co-location of genes with their gene products is required for redox regulation of gene expression, and accounts for the persistence of DNA in bioenergetic organelles.

=== Photosynthetic eukaryotic lineages ===
Symbiotic and kleptoplastic organisms excluded:

- The glaucophytes and the red and green algae—clade Archaeplastida (uni- and multicellular)
- The cryptophytes—clade Cryptista (unicellular)
- The haptophytes—clade Haptista (unicellular)
- The dinoflagellates and chromerids in the superphylum Myzozoa, and Pseudoblepharisma in the phylum Ciliophora—clade Alveolata (unicellular)
- The ochrophytes—clade Stramenopila (uni- and multicellular)
- The chlorarachniophytes and three species of Paulinella in the phylum Cercozoa—clade Rhizaria (unicellular)
- The euglenids—clade Excavata (unicellular)

Except for the euglenids, which are found within the Excavata, all of these belong to the Diaphoretickes. Archaeplastida and the photosynthetic Paulinella got their plastids, which are surrounded by two membranes, through primary endosymbiosis in two separate events, by engulfing a cyanobacterium. The plastids in all the other groups have either a red or green algal origin, and are referred to as the "red lineages" and the "green lineages". The only known exception is the ciliate Pseudoblepharisma tenue, which in addition to its plastids that originated from green algae also has a purple sulfur bacterium as a symbiont. In dinoflagellates and euglenids the plastids are surrounded by three membranes, and in the remaining lines by four. A nucleomorph, remnants of the original algal nucleus located between the inner and outer membranes of the plastid, is present in the cryptophytes (from a red alga) and chlorarachniophytes (from a green alga). Some dinoflagellates that lost their photosynthetic ability later regained it through new endosymbiotic events with different algae. While able to perform photosynthesis, many of these eukaryotic groups are mixotrophs and practice heterotrophy to various degrees.

=== Photosynthetic prokaryotic lineages ===
Early photosynthetic systems, such as those in green and purple sulfur and green and purple nonsulfur bacteria, are thought to have been anoxygenic, and used various other molecules than water as electron donors. Green and purple sulfur bacteria are thought to have used hydrogen and sulfur as electron donors. Green nonsulfur bacteria used various amino and other organic acids as electron donors. Purple nonsulfur bacteria used a variety of nonspecific organic molecules. The use of these molecules is consistent with the geological evidence that Earth's early atmosphere was highly reducing at that time.

With a possible exception of Heimdallarchaeota, photosynthesis is not found in archaea. Haloarchaea are photoheterotrophic; they can absorb energy from the sun, but do not harvest carbon from the atmosphere and are therefore not photosynthetic. Instead of chlorophyll they use rhodopsins, which convert light-energy to ion gradients but cannot mediate electron transfer reactions.

In bacteria eight photosynthetic lineages are currently known:

- Cyanobacteria, the only prokaryotes performing oxygenic photosynthesis and the only prokaryotes that contain two types of photosystems (type I (RCI), also known as Fe-S type, and type II (RCII), also known as quinone type). The seven remaining prokaryotes have anoxygenic photosynthesis and use versions of either type I or type II.
- Chlorobi (green sulfur bacteria) Type I
- Heliobacteria Type I
- Chloracidobacterium Type I
- Proteobacteria (purple sulfur bacteria and purple non-sulfur bacteria) Type II (see: Purple bacteria)
- Chloroflexota (green non-sulfur bacteria) Type II
- Gemmatimonadota Type II
- Eremiobacterota Type II

=== Cyanobacteria and the evolution of photosynthesis ===
The biochemical capacity to use water as the source for electrons in photosynthesis evolved once, in a common ancestor of extant cyanobacteria (formerly called blue-green algae). The geological record indicates that this transforming event took place early in Earth's history, at least 2450–2320 million years ago (Ma), and, it is speculated, much earlier. Because the Earth's atmosphere contained almost no oxygen during the estimated development of photosynthesis, it is believed that the first photosynthetic cyanobacteria did not generate oxygen. Available evidence from geobiological studies of Archean (>2500 Ma) sedimentary rocks indicates that life existed 3500 Ma, but the question of when oxygenic photosynthesis evolved is still unanswered. A clear paleontological window on cyanobacterial evolution opened about 2000 Ma, revealing an already-diverse biota of cyanobacteria. Cyanobacteria remained the principal primary producers of oxygen throughout the Proterozoic Eon (2500–543 Ma), in part because the redox structure of the oceans favored photoautotrophs capable of nitrogen fixation. Green algae joined cyanobacteria as the major primary producers of oxygen on continental shelves near the end of the Proterozoic, but only with the Mesozoic (251–66 Ma) radiations of dinoflagellates, coccolithophorids, and diatoms did the primary production of oxygen in marine shelf waters take modern form. Cyanobacteria remain critical to marine ecosystems as primary producers of oxygen in oceanic gyres, as agents of biological nitrogen fixation, and, in modified form, as the plastids of marine algae.

== Experimental history ==
=== Discovery ===
Although some of the steps in photosynthesis are still not completely understood, the overall photosynthetic equation has been known since the 19th century.

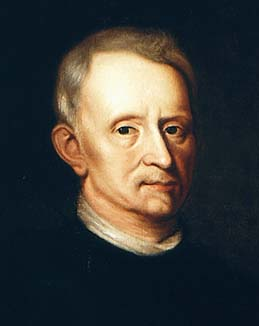
Portrait of Jan Baptist van Helmont by Mary Beale, c. 1674

Jan van Helmont began the research of the process in the mid-17th century when he carefully measured the mass of the soil a plant was using and the mass of the plant as it grew. After noticing that the soil mass changed very little, he hypothesized that the mass of the growing plant must come from the water, the only substance he added to the potted plant. His hypothesis was partially accurate – much of the gained mass comes from carbon dioxide as well as water. However, this was a signaling point to the idea that the bulk of a plant's biomass comes from the inputs of photosynthesis, not the soil itself.

Joseph Priestley, a chemist and minister, discovered that when he isolated a volume of air under an inverted jar and burned a candle in it (which gave off CO_{2}), the candle would burn out very quickly, much before it ran out of wax. He further discovered that a mouse could similarly "injure" air. He then showed that a plant could restore the air the candle and the mouse had "injured".

In 1779, Jan Ingenhousz repeated Priestley's experiments. He discovered that it was the influence of sunlight on the plant that could cause it to revive a mouse in a matter of hours.

In 1796, Jean Senebier, a Swiss pastor, botanist, and naturalist, demonstrated that green plants consume carbon dioxide and release oxygen under the influence of light. Soon afterward, Nicolas-Théodore de Saussure showed that the increase in mass of the plant as it grows could not be due only to uptake of CO_{2} but also to the incorporation of water. Thus, the basic reaction by which organisms use photosynthesis to produce food (such as glucose) was outlined.

=== Refinements ===
Cornelis Van Niel made key discoveries explaining the chemistry of photosynthesis. By studying purple sulfur bacteria and green bacteria, he was the first to demonstrate that photosynthesis is a light-dependent redox reaction in which hydrogen reduces (donates its atoms as electrons and protons to) carbon dioxide.

Robert Emerson discovered two light reactions by testing plant productivity using different wavelengths of light. With the red alone, the light reactions were suppressed. When blue and red were combined, the output was much more substantial. Thus, there were two photosystems, one absorbing up to 600 nm wavelengths, the other up to 700 nm. The former is known as PSII, the latter is PSI. PSI contains only chlorophyll "a", PSII contains primarily chlorophyll "a" with most of the available chlorophyll "b", among other pigments. These include phycobilins, which are the red and blue pigments of red and blue algae, respectively, and fucoxanthol for brown algae and diatoms. The process is most productive when the absorption of quanta is equal in both PSII and PSI, assuring that input energy from the antenna complex is divided between the PSI and PSII systems, which in turn powers the photochemistry.

Robert Hill thought that a complex of reactions consisted of an intermediate to cytochrome b_{6} (now a plastoquinone), and that another was from cytochrome f to a step in the carbohydrate-generating mechanisms. These are linked by plastoquinone, which does require energy to reduce cytochrome f. Further experiments to prove that the oxygen developed during the photosynthesis of green plants came from water were performed by Hill in 1937 and 1939. He showed that isolated chloroplasts give off oxygen in the presence of unnatural reducing agents like iron oxalate, ferricyanide or benzoquinone after exposure to light. In the Hill reaction:

2 H_{2}O + 2 A + (light, chloroplasts) → 2 AH_{2} + O_{2}

A is the electron acceptor. Therefore, in light, the electron acceptor is reduced and oxygen is evolved. Samuel Ruben and Martin Kamen used radioactive isotopes to determine that the oxygen liberated in photosynthesis came from the water.

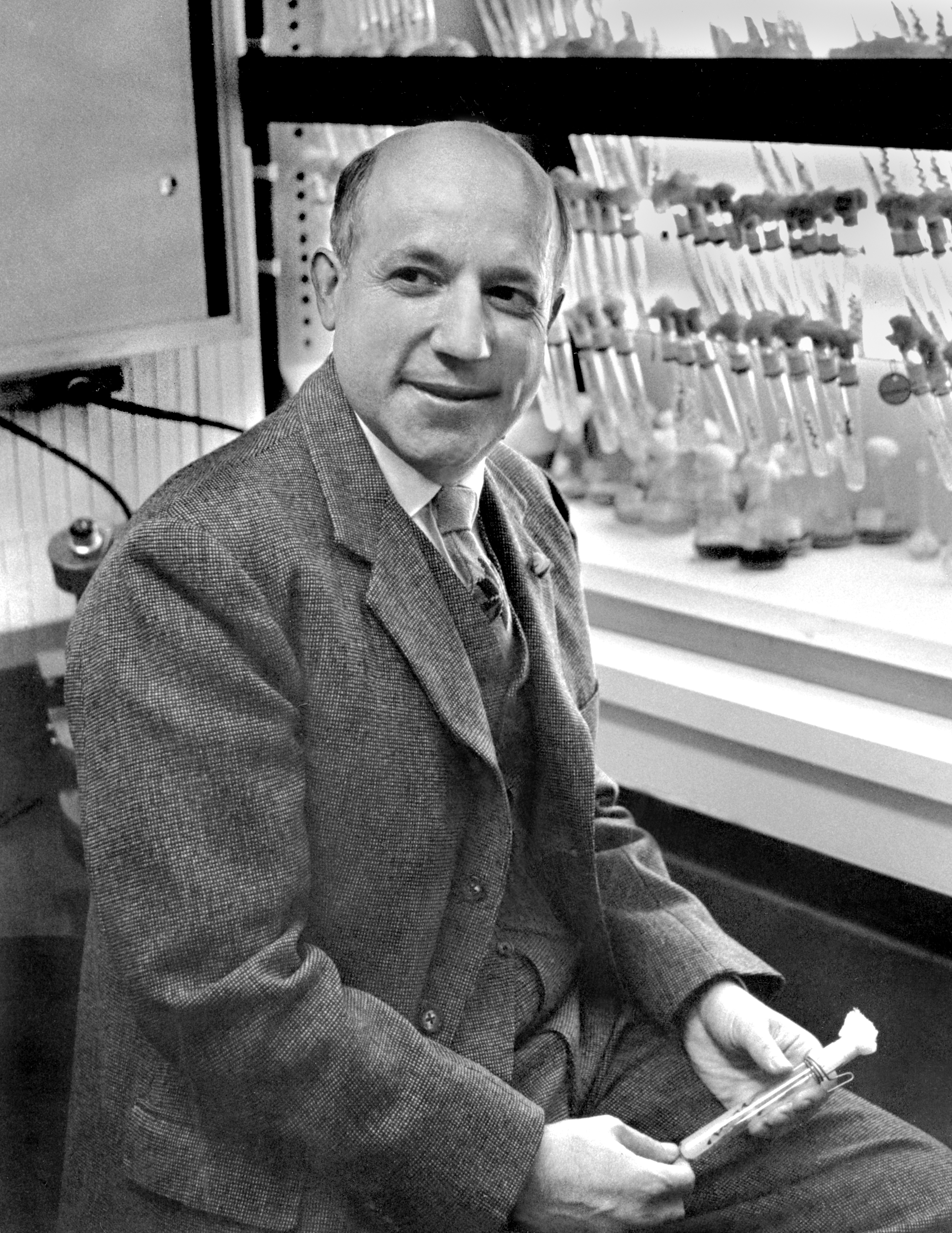
Melvin Calvin works in his photosynthesis laboratory.

Melvin Calvin and Andrew Benson, along with James Bassham, elucidated the path of carbon assimilation (the photosynthetic carbon reduction cycle) in plants. The carbon reduction cycle is known as the Calvin cycle, but many scientists refer to it as the Calvin-Benson, Benson-Calvin, or even Calvin-Benson-Bassham (or CBB) Cycle.

Nobel Prize–winning scientist Rudolph A. Marcus was later able to discover the function and significance of the electron transport chain.

Otto Heinrich Warburg and Dean Burk discovered the I-quantum photosynthesis reaction that splits CO_{2}, activated by the respiration.

In 1950, first experimental evidence for the existence of photophosphorylation in vivo was presented by Otto Kandler using intact Chlorella cells and interpreting his findings as light-dependent ATP formation. In 1954, Daniel I. Arnon et al. discovered photophosphorylation in vitro in isolated chloroplasts with the help of P^{32}.

Louis N. M. Duysens and Jan Amesz discovered that chlorophyll "a" will absorb one light, oxidize cytochrome f, while chlorophyll "a" (and other pigments) will absorb another light but will reduce this same oxidized cytochrome, stating the two light reactions are in series.

=== Development of the concept ===
In 1893, the American botanist Charles Reid Barnes proposed two terms, photosyntax and photosynthesis, for the biological process of synthesis of complex carbon compounds out of carbonic acid, in the presence of chlorophyll, under the influence of light. The term photosynthesis is derived from the Greek phōs (φῶς, 'gleam') and sýnthesis (σύνθεσις, 'arranging together'), while photosyntax comes from sýntaxis (σύνταξις, 'configuration'). Over time, the term photosynthesis came into common usage. Later discovery of anoxygenic photosynthetic bacteria and photophosphorylation necessitated redefinition of the term.

=== C3 : C4 photosynthesis research ===
In the late 1940s at the University of California, Berkeley, the details of photosynthetic carbon metabolism were sorted out by the chemists Melvin Calvin, Andrew Benson, James Bassham and a score of students and researchers utilizing the carbon-14 isotope and paper chromatography techniques. The pathway of CO_{2} fixation by the algae Chlorella in a fraction of a second in light resulted in a three carbon molecule called phosphoglyceric acid (PGA). For that original and ground-breaking work, a Nobel Prize in Chemistry was awarded to Melvin Calvin in 1961. In parallel, plant physiologists studied leaf gas exchanges using the new method of infrared gas analysis and a leaf chamber where the net photosynthetic rates ranged from 10 to 13 μmol CO_{2}·m^{−2}·s^{−1}, with the conclusion that all terrestrial plants have the same photosynthetic capacities, that are light saturated at less than 50% of sunlight.

Later in 1958–1963 at Cornell University, field grown maize was reported to have much greater leaf photosynthetic rates of 40 μmol CO_{2}·m^{−2}·s^{−1} and not be saturated at near full sunlight. This higher rate in maize was almost double of those observed in other species such as wheat and soybean, indicating that large differences in photosynthesis exist among higher plants. At the University of Arizona, detailed gas exchange research on more than 15 species of monocots and dicots uncovered for the first time that differences in leaf anatomy are crucial factors in differentiating photosynthetic capacities among species. In tropical grasses, including maize, sorghum, sugarcane, Bermuda grass and in the dicot amaranthus, leaf photosynthetic rates were around 38−40 μmol CO_{2}·m^{−2}·s^{−1}, and the leaves have two types of green cells, i.e. outer layer of mesophyll cells surrounding a tightly packed cholorophyllous vascular bundle sheath cells. This type of anatomy was termed Kranz anatomy in the 19th century by the botanist Gottlieb Haberlandt while studying leaf anatomy of sugarcane. Plant species with the greatest photosynthetic rates and Kranz anatomy showed no apparent photorespiration, very low CO_{2} compensation point, high optimum temperature, high stomatal resistances and lower mesophyll resistances for gas diffusion and rates never saturated at full sun light. The research at Arizona was designated a Citation Classic in 1986. These species were later termed C4 plants as the first stable compound of CO_{2} fixation in light has four carbons as malate and aspartate. Other species that lack Kranz anatomy were termed C3 type such as cotton and sunflower, as the first stable carbon compound is the three-carbon PGA. At 1000 ppm CO_{2} in measuring air, both the C3 and C4 plants had similar leaf photosynthetic rates around 60 μmol CO_{2}·m^{−2}·s^{−1} indicating the suppression of photorespiration in C3 plants.

== Factors ==
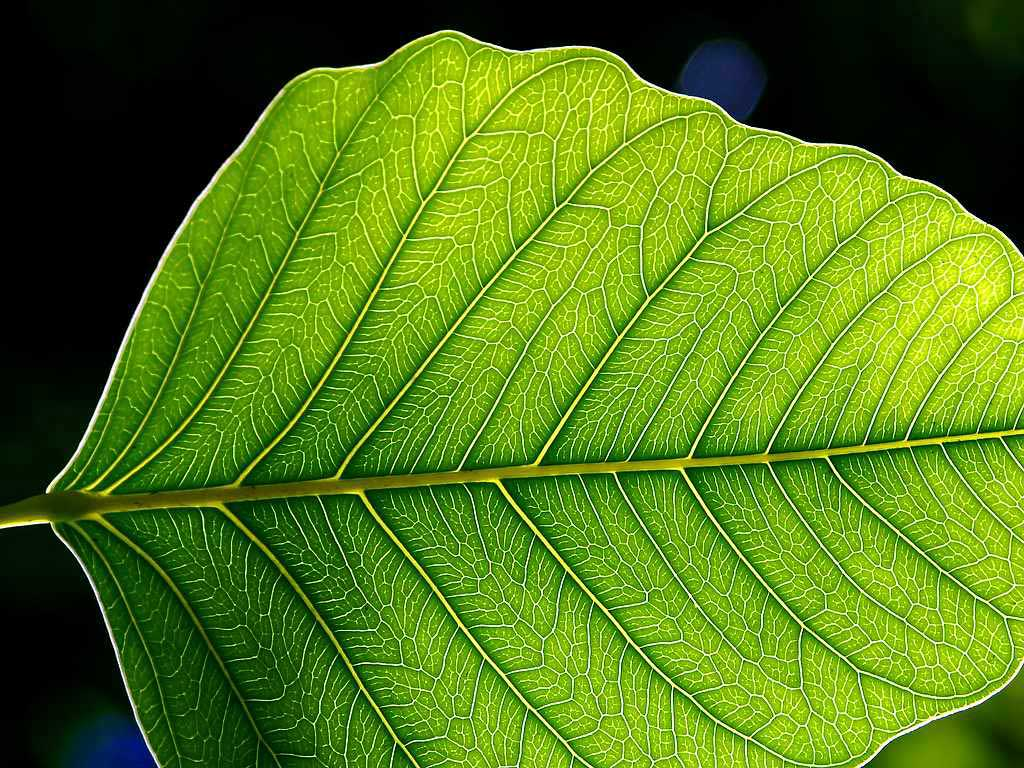
The leaf is the primary site of photosynthesis in plants.

There are four main factors influencing photosynthesis and several corollary factors. The four main are:

- Light irradiance and wavelength
- Water absorption
- Carbon dioxide concentration
- Temperature.

Total photosynthesis is limited by a range of environmental factors. These include the amount of light available, the amount of leaf area a plant has to capture light (shading by other plants is a major limitation of photosynthesis), the rate at which carbon dioxide can be supplied to the chloroplasts to support photosynthesis, the availability of water, and the availability of suitable temperatures for carrying out photosynthesis.

=== Light intensity (irradiance), wavelength and temperature ===
Absorbance spectra of free chlorophyll a (blue) and b (red) in a solvent. The action spectra of chlorophyll molecules are slightly modified in vivo depending on specific pigment–protein interactions.

The process of photosynthesis provides the main input of free energy into the biosphere, and is one of four main ways in which radiation is important for plant life.

The radiation climate within plant communities is extremely variable, in both time and space.

In the early 20th century, Frederick Blackman and Gabrielle Matthaei investigated the effects of light intensity (irradiance) and temperature on the rate of carbon assimilation.

- At constant temperature, the rate of carbon assimilation varies with irradiance, increasing as the irradiance increases, but reaching a plateau at higher irradiance.
- At low irradiance, increasing the temperature has little influence on the rate of carbon assimilation. At constant high irradiance, the rate of carbon assimilation increases as the temperature is increased.

These two experiments illustrate several important points: First, it is known that, in general, photochemical reactions are not affected by temperature. However, these experiments clearly show that temperature affects the rate of carbon assimilation, so there must be two sets of reactions in the full process of carbon assimilation. These are the light-dependent 'photochemical' temperature-independent stage, and the light-independent, temperature-dependent stage. Second, Blackman's experiments illustrate the concept of limiting factors. Another limiting factor is the wavelength of light. Cyanobacteria, which reside several meters underwater, cannot receive the correct wavelengths required to cause photoinduced charge separation in conventional photosynthetic pigments. To combat this problem, Cyanobacteria have a light-harvesting complex called Phycobilisome. This complex is made up of a series of proteins with different pigments which surround the reaction center.

=== Carbon dioxide levels and photorespiration ===
Photorespiration

As carbon dioxide concentrations rise, the rate at which sugars are made by the light-independent reactions increases until limited by other factors. RuBisCO, the enzyme that captures carbon dioxide in the light-independent reactions, has a binding affinity for both carbon dioxide and oxygen. When the concentration of carbon dioxide is high, RuBisCO will fix carbon dioxide. However, if the carbon dioxide concentration is low, RuBisCO will bind oxygen instead of carbon dioxide. This process, called photorespiration, uses energy, but does not produce sugars.

RuBisCO oxygenase activity is disadvantageous to plants for several reasons:

1. One product of oxygenase activity is phosphoglycolate (2 carbon) instead of 3-phosphoglycerate (3 carbon). Phosphoglycolate cannot be metabolized by the Calvin-Benson cycle and represents carbon lost from the cycle. A high oxygenase activity, therefore, drains the sugars that are required to recycle ribulose 5-bisphosphate and for the continuation of the Calvin-Benson cycle.
2. Phosphoglycolate is quickly metabolized to glycolate that is toxic to a plant at a high concentration; it inhibits photosynthesis.
3. Salvaging glycolate is an energetically expensive process that uses the glycolate pathway, and only 75% of the carbon is returned to the Calvin-Benson cycle as 3-phosphoglycerate. The reactions also produce ammonia (NH_{3}), which is able to diffuse out of the plant, leading to a loss of nitrogen.

A highly simplified summary is:

2 glycolate + ATP → 3-phosphoglycerate + carbon dioxide + ADP + NH_{3}

The salvaging pathway for the products of RuBisCO oxygenase activity is more commonly known as photorespiration, since it is characterized by light-dependent oxygen consumption and the release of carbon dioxide.

== See also ==
- Jan Anderson (scientist) – New Zealand scientist
- Artificial photosynthesis – Artificial process that uses sunlight energy to drive chemical synthesis
- Chemosynthesis – Biological process
- Daily light integral – Daily total of photosynthetic light per area
- Integrated fluorometer – Instruments measuring photosynthetic rates
- Organic reaction – Chemical reactions involving organic compounds
- Photobiology – Scientific study of light's effect on living organisms
- Photoinhibition
- Quantasome – Particle found in living cells
- Quantum biology – Application of quantum mechanics and chemistry to biology
- Radiosynthesis – Biological process
- Red edge – Region of change in vegetation reflectance
- Vitamin D – Essential nutrient
