= P700 =

Component of photosynthesis

P700, or photosystem I primary donor, is a molecular dimer of chlorophyll a associated with the reaction center of photosystem I in plants, algae, and cyanobacteria.

== Etymology ==
Its name is derived from the word pigment (P) and the presence of a major bleaching band centered around 695–700 nm in the flash-induced absorbance difference spectra of P700/P700+•.

== Components ==
The structure of P700 consists of a heterodimer with two distinct chlorophyll molecules, specifically chlorophyll a and chlorophyll a′, giving it the additional name of special pair. The pair behaves as if it were just one molecule. This dimer is vital to photosystem I, due to its ability to absorb light energy with a wavelength approximately between 430 nm-700 nm, and transfer high-energy electrons to a series of electron acceptors that are situated near it, like the iron–sulfur protein, ferredoxin (Fd), which has a higher redox potential, i.e. a greater affinity for electrons.

== Action and functions ==
Photosystem I produces NADPH, the reduced form of NADP^{+} (Fd^{2-}_{red} + NADH + 2 NADP^{+} + H^{+} = Fd_{ox} + NAD^{+} + 2 NADPH), at the end of the photosynthetic reaction through electron transfer, and provides energy to a proton pump and eventually ATP, for instance in cyclic electron transport.

=== Excitation ===
When photosystem I absorbs light, an electron is excited to a higher energy level in the P700 chlorophyll. The resulting P700 with an excited electron is designated as P700*, which is a strong reducing agent due to its very negative redox potential of -1.2 V.

=== Electron transport chain ===
Following the excitation of P700, one of its electrons is passed on to an electron acceptor, A_{o}, triggering charge separation and producing an anionic A_{o}^{−} and cationic P700^{+}. Subsequently, electron transfer continues from A_{o} to a phylloquinone molecule known as A_{1}, and then to three iron–sulfur clusters.

Type I photosystems use iron–sulfur proteins as terminal electron acceptors. Thus, the electron is transferred from F_{x} to another iron–sulfur cluster, F_{A}, and then passed on to the last iron–sulfur cluster serving as an electron acceptor, F_{B}. Eventually, the electron is transferred to ferredoxin, causing it to transform into its reduced form, which finalizes the process by reducing NADP^{+} to NADPH.

==== Linear electron transport ====
The rate of electrons being passed from P700* to the subsequent electron acceptors is high, preventing the electron from being transferred back to P700^{+}. Consequently, in most cases, the electrons transferring within photosystem I follow a linear pathway, from the excitation of P700 to the production of NADPH.

==== Cyclic electron transport ====
In certain situations, it is vital for the photosynthetic organism to recycle the electrons being transferred, resulting in the electron from the terminal iron–sulfur cluster F_{B} transferring back to the cytochrome b6f complex (adaptor between photosystems II and I). Utilizing the energy of P700^{+}, the cyclic pathway creates a proton gradient useful for the production of ATP, while no NADPH is produced, since ferredoxin is not reduced.

=== Recovery of P700 ===
P700^{+} recovers its lost electron by oxidizing plastocyanin, which regenerates P700.

== See also ==
- P680
