= Photosynthetic reaction centre =

Complex where conversion of light energy to chemical energy takes place

Electron micrograph of a 2D crystal of the LH1-Reaction center photosynthetic unit.

A photosynthetic reaction center is a complex of several proteins, biological pigments, and other co-factors that together execute the primary energy conversion reactions of photosynthesis. The reaction center is one part of a photosystem, together with the light-harvesting complex. Molecular excitations, either originating directly from sunlight or transferred as excitation energy via light-harvesting antenna systems, give rise to electron transfer reactions along the path of a series of protein-bound co-factors. These co-factors are light-absorbing molecules (also named chromophores or pigments) such as chlorophyll and pheophytin, as well as quinones. The energy of the photon is used to excite an electron of a pigment. The free energy created is then used, via a chain of nearby electron acceptors, for a transfer of hydrogen atoms (as protons and electrons) from H_{2}O or hydrogen sulfide towards carbon dioxide, eventually producing glucose. These electron transfer steps ultimately result in the conversion of the energy of photons to chemical energy.

== Transforming light energy into charge separation ==
Reaction centers are present in all green plants, algae, and many bacteria. A variety in light-harvesting complexes exist across the photosynthetic species. Green plants and algae have two different types of reaction centers that are part of larger supercomplexes known as P700 in Photosystem I and P680 in Photosystem II. The structures of these supercomplexes are large, involving multiple light-harvesting complexes. The reaction center found in Rhodopseudomonas bacteria is currently best understood, since it was the first reaction center of known structure and has fewer polypeptide chains than the examples in green plants.

A reaction center is laid out in such a way that it captures the energy of a photon using pigment molecules and turns it into a usable form. Once the light energy has been absorbed directly by the pigment molecules, or passed to them by resonance transfer from a surrounding light-harvesting complex, they release electrons into an electron transport chain and pass energy to a hydrogen donor such as H_{2}O to extract electrons and protons from it. In green plants, the electron transport chain has many electron acceptors including pheophytin, quinone, plastoquinone, cytochrome bf, and ferredoxin, which result finally in the reduced molecule NADPH, while the energy used to split water results in the release of oxygen. The passage of the electron through the electron transport chain also results in the pumping of protons (hydrogen ions) from the chloroplast's stroma and into the lumen, resulting in a proton gradient across the thylakoid membrane that can be used to synthesize ATP using the ATP synthase molecule. Both the ATP and NADPH are used in the Calvin cycle to fix carbon dioxide into triose sugars.

== Classification ==
Two classes of reaction centres are recognized. Type I, found in green-sulfur bacteria, Heliobacteria, and plant/cyanobacterial PS-I, use iron sulfur clusters as electron acceptors. Type II, found in chloroflexus, purple bacteria, and plant/cyanobacterial PS-II, use quinones. Not only do all members inside each class share common ancestry, but the two classes also, by means of common structure, appear related.

Cyanobacteria, the precursor to chloroplasts found in green plants, have both photosystems with both types of reaction centers. Combining the two systems allows for producing oxygen.

== In purple bacteria (type II) ==
This section deals with the type II system found in purple bacteria.

=== Structure ===
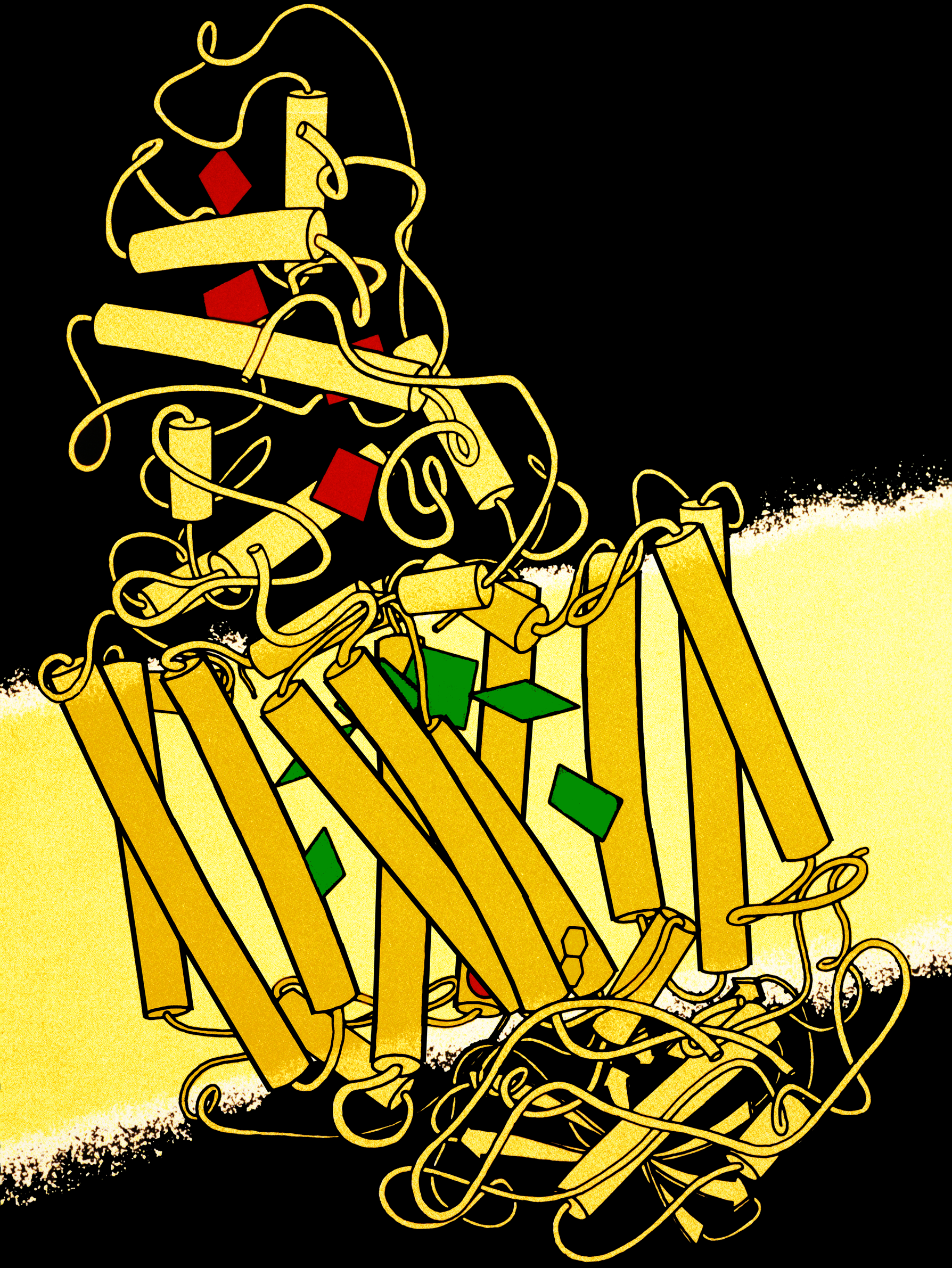
Schematic of reaction center in the membrane, with Cytochrome C at top

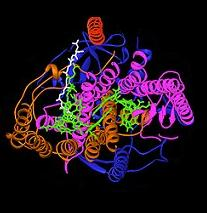
Bacterial photosynthetic reaction center.

The bacterial photosynthetic reaction center has been an important model to understand the structure and chemistry of the biological process of capturing light energy. In the 1960s, Roderick Clayton was the first to purify the reaction center complex from purple bacteria. However, the first crystal structure (upper image at right) was determined in 1984 by Hartmut Michel, Johann Deisenhofer and Robert Huber for which they shared the Nobel Prize in 1988. This was also significant for being the first 3D crystal structure of any membrane protein complex.

Four different subunits were found to be important for the function of the photosynthetic reaction center. The L and M subunits, shown in blue and purple in the image of the structure, both span the lipid bilayer of the plasma membrane. They are structurally similar to one another, both having 5 transmembrane alpha helices. Four bacteriochlorophyll b (BChl-b) molecules, two bacteriopheophytin b molecules (BPh) molecules, two quinones (Q_{A} and Q_{B}), and a ferrous ion are associated with the L and M subunits. The H subunit, shown in gold, lies on the cytoplasmic side of the plasma membrane. A cytochrome subunit, not shown here, contains four c-type hemes and is located on the periplasmic surface (outer) of the membrane. The latter sub-unit is not a general structural motif in photosynthetic bacteria. The L and M subunits bind the functional and light-interacting cofactors, shown here in green.

Reaction centers from different bacterial species may contain slightly altered bacterio-chlorophyll and bacterio-pheophytin chromophores as functional co-factors. These alterations cause shifts in the colour of light that can be absorbed. The reaction center contains two pigments that serve to collect and transfer the energy from photon absorption: BChl and Bph. BChl roughly resembles the chlorophyll molecule found in green plants, but, due to minor structural differences, its peak absorption wavelength is shifted into the infrared, with wavelengths as long as 1000 nm. Bph has the same structure as BChl, but the central magnesium ion is replaced by two protons. This alteration causes both an absorbance maximum shift and a lowered redox potential.

=== Mechanism ===
The light reaction

The process starts when light is absorbed by two BChl molecules that lie near the periplasmic side of the membrane. This pair of chlorophyll molecules, often called the "special pair", absorbs photons at 870 nm or 960 nm, depending on the species and, thus, is called P870 (for Rhodobacter sphaeroides) or P960 (for Blastochloris viridis), with P standing for "pigment"). Once P absorbs a photon, it ejects an electron, which is transferred through another molecule of Bchl to the BPh in the L subunit. This initial charge separation yields a positive charge on P and a negative charge on the BPh. This process takes place in 10 picoseconds (10^{−11} seconds).

The charges on the P^{+} and the BPh^{−} could undergo charge recombination in this state, which would waste the energy and convert it into heat. Several factors of the reaction center structure serve to prevent this. First, the transfer of an electron from BPh^{−} to P960^{+} is relatively slow compared to two other redox reactions in the reaction center. The faster reactions involve the transfer of an electron from BPh^{−} (BPh^{−} is oxidized to BPh) to the electron acceptor quinone (Q_{A}), and the transfer of an electron to P960^{+} (P960^{+} is reduced to P960) from a heme in the cytochrome subunit above the reaction center.

The high-energy electron that resides on the tightly bound quinone molecule Q_{A} is transferred to an exchangeable quinone molecule Q_{B}. This molecule is loosely associated with the protein and is fairly easy to detach. Two electrons are required to fully reduce Q_{B} to QH_{2}, taking up two protons from the cytoplasm in the process. The reduced quinone QH_{2} diffuses through the membrane to another protein complex (cytochrome bc_{1}-complex) where it is oxidized. In the process the reducing power of the QH_{2} is used to pump protons across the membrane to the periplasmic space. The electrons from the cytochrome bc_{1}-complex are then transferred through a soluble cytochrome c intermediate, called cytochrome c_{2}, in the periplasm to the cytochrome subunit.

== In Cyanobacteria and plants ==
Cyanobacteria, the precursor to chloroplasts found in green plants, have both photosystems with both types of reaction centers. Combining the two systems allows for producing oxygen.

=== Oxygenic photosynthesis ===
In 1772, the chemist Joseph Priestley carried out a series of experiments relating to the gases involved in respiration and combustion. In his first experiment, he lit a candle and placed it under an upturned jar. After a short period of time, the candle burned out. He carried out a similar experiment with a mouse in the confined space of the burning candle. He found that the mouse died a short time after the candle had been extinguished. However, he could revivify the foul air by placing green plants in the area and exposing them to light. Priestley's observations were some of the first experiments that demonstrated the activity of a photosynthetic reaction center.

In 1779, Jan Ingenhousz carried out more than 500 experiments spread out over 4 months in an attempt to understand what was really going on. He wrote up his discoveries in a book entitled Experiments upon Vegetables. Ingenhousz took green plants and immersed them in water inside a transparent tank. He observed many bubbles rising from the surface of the leaves whenever the plants were exposed to light. Ingenhousz collected the gas that was given off by the plants and performed several different tests in attempt to determine what the gas was. The test that finally revealed the identity of the gas was placing a smouldering taper into the gas sample and having it relight. This test proved it was oxygen, or, as Joseph Priestley had called it, 'de-phlogisticated air'.

In 1932, Robert Emerson and his student, William A. Arnold, used a repetitive flash technique to precisely measure small quantities of oxygen evolved by chlorophyll in the algae Chlorella. Their experiment proved the existence of a photosynthetic unit. Gaffron and Wohl later interpreted the experiment and realized that the light absorbed by the photosynthetic unit was transferred. This reaction occurs at the reaction center of Photosystem II and takes place in cyanobacteria, algae and green plants.

=== Photosystem II ===
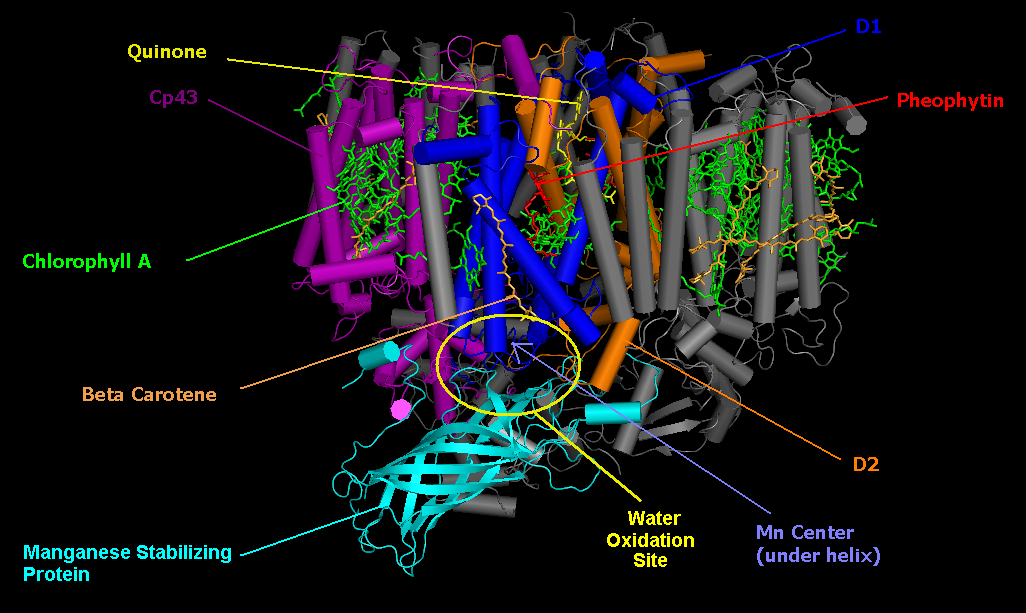
Cyanobacteria photosystem II, Monomer, PDB 2AXT.

Photosystem II is the photosystem that generates the two electrons that (after passing through PSI) will eventually reduce NADP^{+} in ferredoxin-NADP-reductase. Photosystem II is present on the thylakoid membranes inside chloroplasts, the site of photosynthesis in green plants. The structure of Photosystem II is remarkably similar to the bacterial reaction center, and it is theorized that they share a common ancestor.

The core of Photosystem II consists of two subunits referred to as D1 and D2. These two subunits are similar to the L and M subunits present in the bacterial reaction center. Photosystem II differs from the bacterial reaction center in that it has many additional subunits that bind additional chlorophylls to increase efficiency. The overall reaction catalyzed by Photosystem II is:

2Q + 2H_{2}O + hν → O_{2} + 2QH_{2}

Q represents the oxidized form of plastoquinone while QH_{2} represents its reduced form. This process of reducing quinone is comparable to that which takes place in the bacterial reaction center. Photosystem II obtains electrons by oxidizing water in a process called photolysis. Molecular oxygen is a byproduct of this process, and it is this reaction that supplies the atmosphere with oxygen. The fact that the oxygen from green plants originated from water was first deduced by the Canadian-born American biochemist Martin David Kamen. He used a stable isotope of oxygen, ^{18}O, to trace the path of the oxygen from water to gaseous molecular oxygen. This reaction is catalyzed by a reactive center in Photosystem II containing four manganese ions.

Electron transport in PS2.

The reaction begins with the excitation of a pair of chlorophyll molecules similar to those in the bacterial reaction center. Due to the presence of chlorophyll a, as opposed to bacteriochlorophyll, Photosystem II absorbs light at a shorter wavelength. The pair of chlorophyll molecules at the reaction center are often referred to as P680. When the photon has been absorbed, the resulting high-energy electron is transferred to a nearby pheophytin molecule. This is above and to the right of the pair on the diagram and is coloured grey. The electron travels from the pheophytin molecule through two plastoquinone molecules, the first tightly bound, the second loosely bound. The tightly bound molecule is shown above the pheophytin molecule and is colored red. The loosely bound molecule is to the left of this and is also colored red. This flow of electrons is similar to that of the bacterial reaction center. Two electrons are required to fully reduce the loosely bound plastoquinone molecule to QH_{2} as well as the uptake of two protons.

The difference between Photosystem II and the bacterial reaction center is the source of the electron that neutralizes the pair of chlorophyll a molecules. In the bacterial reaction center, the electron is obtained from a reduced compound haem group in a cytochrome subunit or from a water-soluble cytochrome-c protein.

Every time the P680 absorbs a photon, it gives off an electron to pheophytin, gaining a positive charge. After this photoinduced charge separation, P680^{+} is a very strong oxidant of high energy. It passes its energy to water molecules that are bound at the manganese center directly below the pair and extracts an electron from them. This center, below and to the left of the pair in the diagram, contains four manganese ions, a calcium ion, a chloride ion, and a tyrosine residue. Manganese is adept at these reactions because it is capable of existing in four oxidation states: Mn^{2+}, Mn^{3+}, Mn^{4+} and Mn^{5+}. Manganese also forms strong bonds with oxygen-containing molecules such as water. The process of oxidizing two molecules of water to form an oxygen molecule requires four electrons. The water molecules that are oxidized in the manganese center are the source of the electrons that reduce the two molecules of Q to QH_{2}. To date, this water splitting catalytic center has not been reproduced by any man-made catalyst.

=== Photosystem I ===
After the electron has left Photosystem II it is transferred to a cytochrome b6f complex and then to plastocyanin, a blue copper protein and electron carrier. The plastocyanin complex carries the electron that will neutralize the pair in the next reaction center, Photosystem I.

As with Photosystem II and the bacterial reaction center, a pair of chlorophyll a molecules initiates photoinduced charge separation. This pair is referred to as P700, where 700 is a reference to the wavelength at which the chlorophyll molecules absorb light maximally. The P700 lies in the center of the protein. Once photoinduced charge separation has been initiated, the electron travels down a pathway through a chlorophyll α molecule situated directly above the P700, through a quinone molecule situated directly above that, through three 4Fe-4S clusters, and finally to an interchangeable ferredoxin complex. Ferredoxin is a soluble protein containing a 2Fe-2S cluster coordinated by four cysteine residues. The positive charge on the high-energy P700^{+} is neutralized by the transfer of an electron from plastocyanin, which receives energy eventually used to convert QH_{2} back to Q. Thus the overall reaction catalyzed by Photosystem I is:

Pc(Cu^{+}) + Fd[ox] + hν → Pc(Cu^{2+}) + Fd[red]

The cooperation between Photosystems I and II creates an electron and proton flow from H_{2}O to NADP^{+}, producing NADPH needed for glucose synthesis. This pathway is called the 'Z-scheme' because the redox diagram from H_{2}O to NADP^{+} via P680 and P700 resembles the letter Z.

== See also ==
- Dioxygen in biological reactions (oxygen in biological processes)
- Light-harvesting complex
- Photosynthesis
- Photosystem
- Phycobilisome
- Photosynthetic reaction center protein family
