= Unspecific monooxygenase =

Class of enzymes

unspecific monooxygenase

Identifiers
- EC no.: 1.14.14.1
- CAS no.: 62213-32-5

Databases
- IntEnz: IntEnz view
- BRENDA: BRENDA entry
- ExPASy: NiceZyme view
- KEGG: KEGG entry
- MetaCyc: metabolic pathway
- PRIAM: profile
- PDB structures: RCSB PDB PDBe PDBsum
- Gene Ontology: AmiGO / QuickGO
Search
- PMC: articles
- PubMed: articles
- NCBI: proteins

In enzymology, an unspecific monooxygenase (EC 1.14.14.1) is an enzyme that catalyzes the chemical reaction

RH + reduced flavoprotein + O_{2} $\rightleftharpoons$ ROH + oxidized flavoprotein + H_{2}O

The 3 substrates of this enzyme are RH (reduced substrate), reduced flavoprotein, and O_{2}, whereas its 3 products are ROH (oxidized substrate), oxidized flavoprotein, and H_{2}O.

This enzyme belongs to the family of oxidoreductases, specifically those acting on paired donors, with O2 as oxidant and incorporation or reduction of oxygen. The oxygen incorporated need not be derived from O2 with reduced flavin or flavoprotein as one donor, and incorporation of one atom of oxygen into the other donor. The systematic name of this enzyme class is substrate,reduced-flavoprotein:oxygen oxidoreductase (RH-hydroxylating or -epoxidizing). Other names in common use include microsomal monooxygenase, xenobiotic monooxygenase, aryl-4-monooxygenase, aryl hydrocarbon hydroxylase, microsomal P-450, flavoprotein-linked monooxygenase, and flavoprotein monooxygenase. This enzyme participates in 7 metabolic pathways: fatty acid metabolism, androgen and estrogen metabolism, gamma-hexachlorocyclohexane degradation, tryptophan metabolism, arachidonic acid metabolism, linoleic acid metabolism, and metabolism of xenobiotics by cytochrome p450. It employs one cofactor, heme.

== Structural studies ==
As of late 2007, 53 structures have been solved for this class of enzymes, with PDB accession codes 1BU7, 1BVY, 1DT6, 1FAG, 1FAH, 1JME, 1JPZ, 1N6B, 1NR6, 1OG2, 1OG5, 1P0V, 1P0W, 1P0X, 1PO5, 1PQ2, 1R9O, 1SMI, 1SMJ, 1SUO, 1TQN, 1W0E, 1W0F, 1W0G, 1YQO, 1YQP, 1Z10, 1Z11, 1ZO4, 1ZO9, 1ZOA, 2BDM, 2BMH, 2F9Q, 2FDU, 2FDV, 2FDW, 2FDY, 2HI4, 2HPD, 2IJ2, 2IJ3, 2IJ4, 2J0D, 2J1M, 2J4S, 2NNB, 2P85, 2PG5, 2PG6, 2PG7, 2UWH, and 2V0M.
