= P680 =

Photosystem II primary donor

P680, or photosystem II primary donor, is the reaction-center chlorophyll a molecular dimer associated with photosystem II in plants, algae, and cyanobacteria, and central to oxygenic photosynthesis.

== Etymology ==
Its name is derived from the word “pigment” (P) and the presence of a major bleaching band centered around 680-685 nm in the flash-induced absorbance difference spectra of P680/ P680+•.

== Components ==
The structure of P680 consists of a heterodimer of two distinct chlorophyll molecules, referred to as P_{D1} and P_{D2}. This “special pair” forms an excitonic dimer that functions as a single unit, excited by light energy as if they were a single molecule.

== Action and function ==
=== Excitation ===
P680 receives excitation energy either by directly absorbing a photon of suitable frequency or indirectly from other chlorophylls within photosystem II, thereby exciting an electron to a higher energy level. The resulting P680 with a loosened electron is designated as P680*, which is a strong reducing agent.

=== Charge separation ===
Following excitation, the loosened electron of P680* is taken up by the primary electron acceptor, a pheophytin molecule located within photosystem II near P680. During this transfer, P680* is ionized and oxidized, producing cationic P680^{+}.

=== Recovery of P680 ===
P680^{+} is the strongest biological oxidizing agent known, with an estimated redox potential of ~1.3 V. This makes it possible to oxidize water during oxygenic photosynthesis. P680^{+} recovers its lost electron by oxidizing water via the oxygen-evolving complex, which regenerates P680.

== See also ==
- P700
- Photosystem I
- Photosystem II

== Bibliography ==
- Raszewski, Grzegorz; Diner, Bruce A.; Schlodder, Eberhard & Renger, Thomas (2008). "Spectroscopic properties of reaction center pigments in photosystem II core complexes: Revision of the multimer model". Biophys. J. 95 (1): 105–119. Bibcode:2008BpJ....95..105R. doi:10.1529/biophysj.107.123935. PMC 2426664. PMID 18339736.
- Rappaport, F; Guergova-Kuras, M; Nixon, PJ; Diner, BA; Lavergne, J (2002). "Kinetics and pathways of charge recombination in photosystem II" (PDF). Biochemistry. 41 (26): 8518–8527. doi:10.1021/bi025725p. PMID 12081503.
