= Photoinduced charge separation =

Process involving electrons

Photoinduced charge separation is the process of an electron in an atom or molecule, being excited to a higher energy level by the absorption of a photon and then leaving the atom or molecule to free space, or to a nearby electron acceptor.

== Rutherford model ==
An atom consists of a positively charged nucleus surrounded by bound electrons. The nucleus consists of uncharged neutrons and positively charged protons. Electrons are negatively charged. In the early part of the twentieth century Ernest Rutherford suggested that the electrons orbited the dense central nucleus in a manner analogous to planets orbiting the Sun. The centripetal force required to keep the electrons in orbit was provided by the Coulomb force of the protons in the nucleus acting upon the electrons; just like the gravitational force of the Sun acting on a planet provides the centripetal force necessary to keep the planet in orbit.

This model, although appealing, doesn't hold true in the real world. Synchrotron radiation would cause the orbiting electron to lose orbital energy and spiral inward since the vector quantity of acceleration of the particle multiplied by its mass (the value of the force required to keep the electron in circular motion) would be less than the electrical force the proton applied to the electron.

Once the electron spiralled into the nucleus the electron would combine with a proton to form a neutron, and the atom would cease to exist. This model is clearly wrong.

== Bohr model ==
In 1913, Niels Bohr refined the Rutherford model by stating that the electrons existed in discrete quantized states called energy levels. This meant that the electrons could only occupy orbits at certain energies. The laws of quantum physics apply here, and they don't comply with the laws of classical newtonian mechanics.

An electron which is stationary and completely free from the atom has an energy of 0 joules (or 0 electronvolts). An electron which is described as being at the "ground state" has a (negative) energy which is equal to the ionization energy of the atom. The electron will reside in this energy level under normal circumstances, unless the ground state is full, in which case additional electrons will reside in higher energy states.

If a photon of light hits the atom it will be absorbed if, and only if, the energy of that photon is equal to the difference between the ground state and another energy level in that atom. This raises the electron to a higher energy level.

If a photon of light hitting the atom has energy greater than the ionization energy, it will be absorbed and the electron absorbing the energy will be ejected from the atom with an energy equal to the photon energy minus the ionization energy.

== See also ==
- Ionization chamber
- Ionization energy
- Photocatalysis
- Photoelectric effect
- Photovoltaics
