= Pheophytin =

Chlorophyll molecule lacking a central Mg^{2+} ion

Pheophytin a, i.e. chlorophyll a without the Mg^{2+} ion.

Pheophytin or phaeophytin is a chemical compound that serves as the first electron carrier intermediate in the electron transfer pathway of Photosystem II (PS II) in plants, and the type II photosynthetic reaction center (RC P870) found in purple bacteria. In both PS II and RC P870, light drives electrons from the reaction center through pheophytin, which then passes the electrons to a quinone (Q_{A}) in RC P870 and RC P680. The overall mechanisms, roles, and purposes of the pheophytin molecules in the two transport chains are analogous to each other.

== Structure ==
In biochemical terms, pheophytin is a chlorophyll molecule lacking a central Mg^{2+} ion. It can be produced from chlorophyll by treatment with a weak acid, producing a dark bluish waxy pigment. The probable etymology comes from this description, with pheo meaning dusky and phyt meaning vegetation.

== History and discovery ==
In 1977, scientists Klevanik, Klimov, Shuvalov performed a series of experiments to demonstrate that it is pheophytin and not plastoquinone that serves as the primary electron acceptor in photosystem II. Using several experiments, including electron paramagnetic resonance (EPR), they were able to show that pheophytin was reducible and, therefore, the primary electron acceptor between P680 and plastoquinone (Klimov, Allakhverdiev, Klevanik, Shuvalov). This discovery was met with fierce opposition, since many believed pheophytin to only be a byproduct of chlorophyll degradation. Therefore, more experiments ensued to prove that pheophytin is indeed the primary electron acceptor of PSII, occurring between P680 and plastoquinone (Klimov, Allakhverdiev, Shuvalov). The data that was obtained is as follows:

1. Photo-reduction of pheophytin has been observed in various mixtures containing PSII reaction centers.
2. The quantity of pheophytin is in direct proportion to the number of PSII reaction centers.
3. Photo-reduction of pheophytin occurs at temperatures as low as 100K, and is observed after the reduction of plastoquinone.

These observations are all characteristic of photo-conversions of reaction center components.

== Reaction in purple bacteria ==
Pheophytin is the first electron carrier intermediate in the photoreaction center (RC P870) of purple bacteria. Its involvement in this system can be broken down into 5 basic steps. The first step is excitation of the bacteriochlorophylls (Chl)_{2} or the special pair of chlorophylls. This can be seen in the following reaction.

(Chl)_{2} + 1 photon → (Chl)_{2}^{*} (excitation)

The second step involves the (Chl)_{2} passing an electron to pheophytin, producing a negatively charged radical (the pheophytin) and a positively charged radical (the special pair of chlorophylls), which results in a charge separation.

(Chl)_{2}^{*} + Pheo → ·(Chl)_{2}^{+} + ·Pheo^{−} (charge separation)

The third step is the rapid electron movement to the tightly bound menaquinone, Q_{A}, which immediately donates the electrons to a second, loosely bound quinone (Q_{B}). Two electron transfers convert Q_{B} to its reduced form (Q_{B}H_{2}).

2·Pheo^{−} + 2H^{+} + Q_{B} → 2Pheo + Q_{B}H_{2} (quinone reduction)

The fifth and final step involves the filling of the “hole” in the special pair by an electron from a heme in cytochrome c. This regenerates the substrates and completes the cycle, allowing for subsequent reactions to take place.

== Involvement in photosystem II ==
In photosystem II, pheophytin plays a very similar role. It again acts as the first electron carrier intermediate in the photosystem. After P680 becomes excited to P680^{*}, it transfers an electron to pheophytin, which converts the molecule into a negatively charged radical. Two negatively charged pheophytin radicals quickly pass their extra electrons to two consecutive plastoquinone molecules. Eventually, the electrons pass through the cytochrome b_{6}f molecule and leaves photosystem II. The reactions outlined above in the section concerning purple bacteria give a general illustration of the actual movement of the electrons through pheophytin and the photosystem. The overall scheme is:

1. Excitation
2. Charge separation
3. Plastoquinone reduction
4. Regeneration of substrates

== See also ==
- Photosynthesis
- Photosystem
- Chlorophyll
- Reaction center
- P680
- Chlorophyllide
