= Photosynthetic efficiency =

Ecological metric

The photosynthetic efficiency (i.e. oxygenic photosynthesis efficiency) is the fraction of light energy converted into chemical energy during photosynthesis in green plants and algae. Photosynthesis can be described by the simplified chemical reaction

6 H_{2}O + 6 CO_{2} + energy → C_{6}H_{12}O_{6} + 6 O_{2}

where C_{6}H_{12}O_{6} is glucose (which is subsequently transformed into other sugars, starches, cellulose, lignin, and so forth). The value of the photosynthetic efficiency is dependent on how light energy is defined – it depends on whether we count only the light that is absorbed, and on what kind of light is used (see Photosynthetically active radiation). It takes eight (or perhaps ten or more) photons to use one molecule of CO_{2}. The Gibbs free energy for converting a mole of CO_{2} to glucose is 114 kcal, whereas eight moles of photons of wavelength 600 nm contains 381 kcal, giving a nominal efficiency of 30%. However, photosynthesis can occur with light up to wavelength 720 nm so long as there is also light at wavelengths below 680 nm to keep Photosystem II operating (see Chlorophyll). Using longer wavelengths means less light energy is needed for the same number of photons and therefore for the same amount of photosynthesis. For actual sunlight, where only 45% of the light is in the photosynthetically active spectrum, the theoretical maximum efficiency of solar energy conversion is approximately 11%. In actuality, however, plants do not absorb all incoming sunlight (due to reflection, respiration requirements of photosynthesis and the need for optimal solar radiation levels) and do not convert all harvested energy into biomass, which results in a maximum overall photosynthetic efficiency of 3 to 6% of total solar radiation. If photosynthesis is inefficient, excess light energy must be dissipated to avoid damaging the photosynthetic apparatus. Energy can be dissipated as heat (non-photochemical quenching), or emitted as chlorophyll fluorescence.

== Typical efficiencies ==
=== Plants ===
Quoted values sunlight-to-biomass efficiency

| Plant | Efficiency |
|---|---|
| Plants, typical | >0.1% 0.2–2% <1% |
| Typical crop plants | 1–2% |
| C3 plants, peak | 3.5% |
| C4 plants, peak | 4.3% |

The following is a breakdown of the energetics of the photosynthesis process from Photosynthesis by Hall and Rao:

Starting with the solar spectrum falling on a leaf,

- 47% lost due to photons outside the 400–700 nm active range (chlorophyll uses photons between 400 and 700 nm, extracting the energy of one 700 nm photon from each one)
- 30% of the in-band photons are lost due to incomplete absorption or photons hitting components other than chloroplasts
- 24% of the absorbed photon energy is lost due to degrading short wavelength photons to the 700 nm energy level
- 68% of the used energy is lost in conversion into d-glucose
- 35–45% of the glucose is consumed by the leaf in the processes of dark and photo respiration

Stated another way:

- 100% sunlight → non-bioavailable photons waste is 47%, leaving
- 53% (in the 400–700 nm range) → 30% of photons are lost due to incomplete absorption, leaving
- 37% (absorbed photon energy) → 24% is lost due to wavelength-mismatch degradation to 700 nm energy, leaving
- 28.2% (sunlight energy collected by chlorophyll) → 68% is lost in conversion of ATP and NADPH to d-glucose, leaving
- 9% (collected as sugar) → 35–40% of sugar is recycled/consumed by the leaf in dark and photo-respiration, leaving
- 5.4% net leaf efficiency.

Many plants lose much of the remaining energy on growing roots. Most crop plants store ~0.25% to 0.5% of the sunlight in the product (corn kernels, potato starch, etc.).

Photosynthesis increases linearly with light intensity at low intensity, but at higher intensity this is no longer the case (see Photosynthesis-irradiance curve). Above about 10,000 lux or ~100 watts/square meter the rate no longer increases. Thus, most plants can only use ~10% of full mid-day sunlight intensity. This dramatically reduces average achieved photosynthetic efficiency in fields compared to peak laboratory results. However, real plants (as opposed to laboratory test samples) have many redundant, randomly oriented leaves. This helps to keep the average illumination of each leaf well below the mid-day peak enabling the plant to achieve a result closer to the expected laboratory test results using limited illumination.

Only if the light intensity is above a plant specific value, called the compensation point the plant assimilates more carbon and releases more oxygen by photosynthesis than it consumes by cellular respiration for its own current energy demand.
Photosynthesis measurement systems are not designed to directly measure the amount of light absorbed by the leaf. Nevertheless, the light response curves that the class produces do allow comparisons in photosynthetic efficiency between plants.

=== Algae and other monocellular organisms ===
From a 2010 study by the University of Maryland, photosynthesizing cyanobacteria have been shown to be a significant contributor in the global carbon cycle, accounting for 20–30% of Earth's photosynthetic productivity and convert solar energy into biomass-stored chemical energy at the rate of ~450 TW. Some pigments such as B-phycoerythrin that are mostly found in red algae and cyanobacteria has much higher light-harvesting efficiency compared to that of other plants. Such organisms are potentially candidates for biomimicry technology to improve solar panels design.

== Efficiencies of various biofuel crops ==
Popular choices for plant biofuels include: oil palm, soybean, castor oil, sunflower oil, safflower oil, corn ethanol, and sugar cane ethanol.

A 2008 Hawaiian oil palm plantation projection stated: "algae could yield from 5,000-10,000 gallons of oil per acre yearly, compared to 250-350 gallons for jatropha and 600-800 gallons for palm oil". That comes to 26 kW per acre or 7 W/m^{2}. Typical insolation in Hawaii is around 230 W/m^{2}., so converting 3% of the incident solar energy to chemical fuel. Total photosynthetic efficiency would include more than just the biodiesel oil, so this number is a lower bound.

Contrast this with a typical photovoltaic installation, which would produce an average of roughly 22 W/m^{2} (roughly 10% of the average insolation), throughout the year. Furthermore, the photovoltaic panels would produce electricity, which is a high-quality form of energy, whereas converting the biodiesel into mechanical energy entails the loss of a large portion of the energy. On the other hand, a liquid fuel is much more convenient for a vehicle than electricity, which has to be stored in heavy, expensive batteries.

Most crop plants store ~0.25% to 0.5% of the sunlight in the product (corn kernels, potato starch, etc.) Ethanol fuel in Brazil has a calculation that results in: "Per hectare per year, the biomass produced corresponds to 0.27 TJ. This is equivalent to 0.86 W/m^{2}. Assuming an average insolation of 225 W/m^{2}, the photosynthetic efficiency of sugarcane is 0.38%." Sucrose accounts for little more than 30% of the chemical energy stored in the mature plant; 35% is in the leaves and stem tips, which are left in the fields during harvest, and 35% are in the fibrous material (bagasse) left over from pressing.

== C3 vs. C4 and CAM plants ==
C3 plants use the Calvin cycle to fix carbon. C4 plants use a modified Calvin cycle in which they separate Ribulose-1,5-bisphosphate carboxylase oxygenase (RuBisCO) from atmospheric oxygen, fixing carbon in their mesophyll cells and using oxaloacetate and malate to ferry the fixed carbon to RuBisCO and the rest of the Calvin cycle enzymes isolated in the bundle-sheath cells. The intermediate compounds both contain four carbon atoms, which gives C4. In Crassulacean acid metabolism (CAM), time isolates functioning RuBisCO (and the other Calvin cycle enzymes) from high oxygen concentrations produced by photosynthesis, in that O_{2} is evolved during the day, and allowed to dissipate then, while at night atmospheric CO_{2} is taken up and stored as malic or other acids. During the day, CAM plants close stomata and use stored acids as carbon sources for sugar, etc. production.

The C3 pathway requires 18 ATP and 12 NADPH for the synthesis of one molecule of glucose (3 ATP + 2 NADPH per CO_{2} fixed) while the C4 pathway requires 30 ATP and 12 NADPH (C3 + 2 ATP per CO_{2} fixed). In addition, we can take into account that each NADPH is equivalent to 3 ATP, that means both pathways require 36 additional (equivalent of) ATP. Despite this reduced ATP efficiency, C4 is an evolutionary advancement, adapted to areas of high levels of light, where the reduced ATP efficiency is more than offset by the use of increased light. The ability to thrive despite restricted water availability maximizes the ability to use available light. The simpler C3 cycle which operates in most plants is adapted to wetter darker environments, such as many northern latitudes. Maize, sugar cane, and sorghum are C4 plants. These plants are economically important in part because of their relatively high photosynthetic efficiencies compared to many other crops. Pineapple is a CAM plant.

== Research ==
=== Photorespiration ===
One efficiency-focused research topic is improving the efficiency of photorespiration. Around 25% of the time RuBisCO incorrectly collects oxygen molecules instead of CO_{2}, creating CO_{2} and ammonia that disrupt the photosynthesis process. Plants remove these byproducts via photorespiration, requiring energy and nutrients that would otherwise increase photosynthetic output. In C3 plants photorespiration can consume 20-50% of photosynthetic energy.

==== Engineered tobacco ====
The research shortened photosynthetic pathways in tobacco. Engineered crops grew taller and faster, yielding up to 40% more biomass. The study employed synthetic biology to construct new metabolic pathways and assessed their efficiency with and without transporter RNAi. The most efficient pathway increased light-use efficiency by 17%.

=== Expanding photosynthetically active radiation with pigment bioengineering ===
Far-red

In efforts to increase photosynthetic efficiency, researchers have proposed extending the spectrum of light that is available for photosynthesis. One approach involves incorporating pigments like chlorophyll d and f, which are capable of absorbing far-red light, into the photosynthetic machinery of higher plants. Naturally present in certain cyanobacteria, these chlorophylls enable photosynthesis with far-red light that standard chlorophylls a and b cannot utilize. By adapting these pigments for use in higher plants, it is hoped that plants can be engineered to utilize a wider range of the light spectrum, potentially leading to increased growth rates and biomass production.

Green

Green light is considered the least efficient wavelength in the visible spectrum for photosynthesis and presents an opportunity for increased utilization. Chlorophyll c is a pigment found in marine algae with blue-green absorption and could be used to expand absorption in the green wavelengths in plants. Expression of the dinoflagellate CHLOROPHYLL C SYNTHASE gene in the plant Nicotiana benthamiana resulted in the heterologous production of chlorophyll c. This was the first successful introduction of a foreign chlorophyll molecule into a higher plant and is the first step towards bioengineering plants for improved photosynthetic performance across a variety of lighting conditions.

=== Chloroplast biogenesis ===
Research is being done into RCB and NCP, two non-catalytic thioredoxin-like proteins that activate chloroplast transcription. Knowing the exact mechanism can be useful to allow increasing photosynthesis (i.e. through genetic modification).

=== Ecosystem research on photosynthetic efficiency ===
Photosynthesis is the only process that allows the conversion of atmospheric carbon (CO_{2}) to organic (solid) carbon, and this process plays an essential role in climate models. This lead researchers to study the sun-induced chlorophyll fluorescence (i.e., chlorophyll fluorescence that uses the Sun as illumination source; the glow of a plant) as an indicator of photosynthetic efficiency of a region. This is interesting for scientists since its shows them things like the CO_{2} absorption of a forests, or the productivity of an agricultural region. The FLEX (satellite) is the upcoming satellite program by the European Space Agency designated to this type of measurements.

== See also ==
- Energy conversion efficiency
- FLEX (satellite)
- Phototroph
- Photosynthetically active radiation
