= Chlorophyll c =

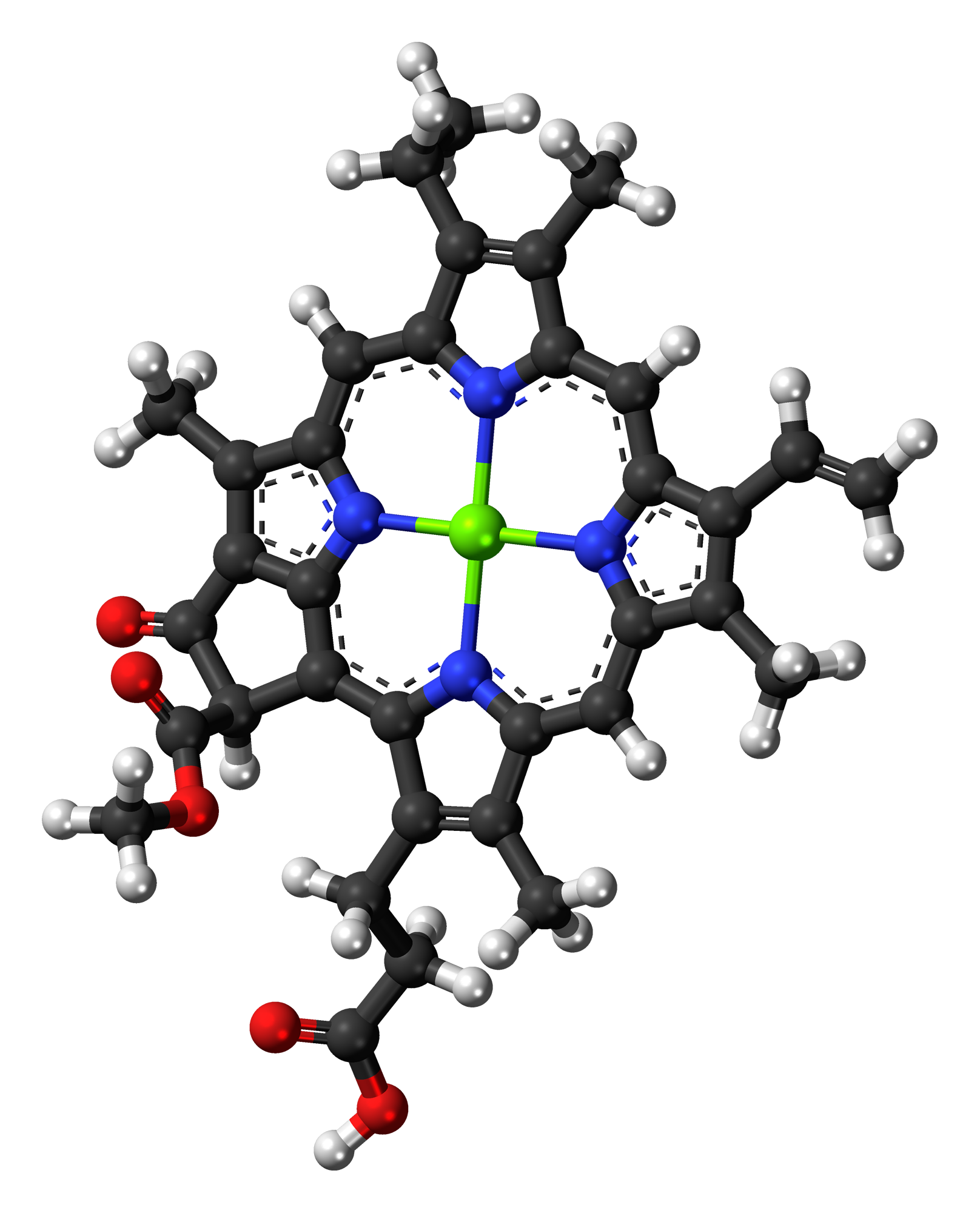

Names
- IUPAC name [(2E)-3-[14-Ethyl-21-(methoxycarbonyl)-4,8,13,18-tetramethyl-20-oxo-9-vinyl-3,4-didehydro-3-phorbinyl-κ2N23,N25]acrylato(2-)]magnesium

Identifiers
CAS Number	11003-45-5; c1: 18901-56-9; c2: 27736-03-4; c3: 111308-93-1
3D model (JSmol)	Interactive image; c1: Interactive image
Beilstein Reference	5801077, 6996880
ChEBI	CHEBI:38202
ChemSpider	21865345
PubChem CID	25245630
UNII	1A9E276K41; c1: 008W2KH70E; c2: 8GAP92KIWW; c3: FMN10170B8
- InChI: InChI=1S/C35H32N4O5.Mg/c1-8-19-15(3)22-12-24-17(5)21(10-11-28(40)41)32(38-24)30-31(35(43)44-7)34(42)29-18(6)25(39-33(29)30)14-27-20(9-2)16(4)23(37-27)13-26(19)36-22;/h8,10-14,31H,1,9H2,2-7H3,(H3,36,37,38,39,40,41,42);/q;+2/p-2/b11-10+,22-12-,23-13-,24-12-,25-14-,26-13-,27-14-,32-30-; Key: DGNIJJSSARBJSH-QRKQXEOSSA-L
- SMILES: CCC1=C(C)/C2=C/c3c(C=C)c(C)c4\C=C5/N=C(C(\C=C\C(O)=O)=C/5C)C5=c6c(C(=O)C5C(=O)OC)c(C)c(=CC1=N\2)n6[Mg]n34; c1: COC(=O)C9C(=O)c6c(C)c3n7c6c9c2c(C=CC(=O)O)c(C)c1cc5n8c(cc4n([Mg]78n12)c(c=3)c(CC)c4c)c(C=C)c5C

Properties
Chemical formula	C_{35}H_{30}MgN_{4}O_{5}
Molar mass	610.953 g·mol^{−1}
- Except where otherwise noted, data are given for materials in their standard state (at 25 °C [77 °F], 100 kPa). verify (what is ?) Infobox references

Chlorophyll c refers to forms of chlorophyll found in certain marine algae, including the photosynthetic Chromista (e.g. diatoms and brown algae) and dinoflagellates. These pigments are characterized by their unusual chemical structure, with a porphyrin as opposed to the chlorin (which has a reduced ring D) as the core; they also do not have an isoprenoid tail. Both these features stand out from the other chlorophylls commonly found in algae and plants.

It has a blue-green color and is an accessory pigment, particularly significant in its absorption of light in the 447–520 nm wavelength region. Like chlorophyll a and chlorophyll b, it helps the organism gather light and passes a quanta of excitation energy through the light harvesting antennae to the photosynthetic reaction centre.

Chlorophyll c can be further divided into chlorophyll c_{1}, chlorophyll c_{2}, and chlorophyll c_{3}, plus at least eight other more recently found subtypes.

== Chlorophyll c_{1} ==
Chlorophyll c_{1} is a common form of chlorophyll c. It differs from chlorophyll c_{2} in its C8 group, having an ethyl group instead of vinyl group (C-C single bond instead of C=C double bond). Its absorption maxima are around 444, 577, 626 nm and 447, 579, 629 nm in diethyl ether and acetone respectively.

== Chlorophyll c_{2} ==
Chlorophyll c_{2} is the most common form of chlorophyll c. Its absorption maxima are around 447, 580, 627 nm and 450, 581, 629 nm in diethyl ether and acetone respectively.

== Chlorophyll c_{3} ==
Chlorophyll c_{3} is a form of chlorophyll c found in microalga Emiliania huxleyi, identified in 1989 by Shirley Jeffrey. Its absorption maxima are around 452, 585, 625 nm and 452, 585, 627 nm in diethyl ether and acetone respectively.

== Biosynthesis ==
Chlorophyll c synthesis branches off early from the typical chlorophyllide synthesis pathway, after divinylprotochlorophyllide (DV-PChlide) is formed. It has been established that DV-PChlide and MV-PChlide are processed directly by a 17^{1} oxidase (CHLC, chlorophyll c synthase) into Chl c_{2} and Chl c_{1}, respectively. The 17^{1} oxidtion was proposed to proceed by "hydroxylation of the 17-propionate reside at the 17^{1}-position and successive dehydration to the 17-acrylate residue." An 8-vinyl reductase (elaborating on the promiscuous behavior of ferredoxin-type 3,8-divinyl chlorophyllide reductase) could also convert Chl c_{2} into Chl c_{1}. The two steps could be swapped for the same effect.

== Structure ==
Chlorophyll c_{1}

Chlorophyll c_{2}

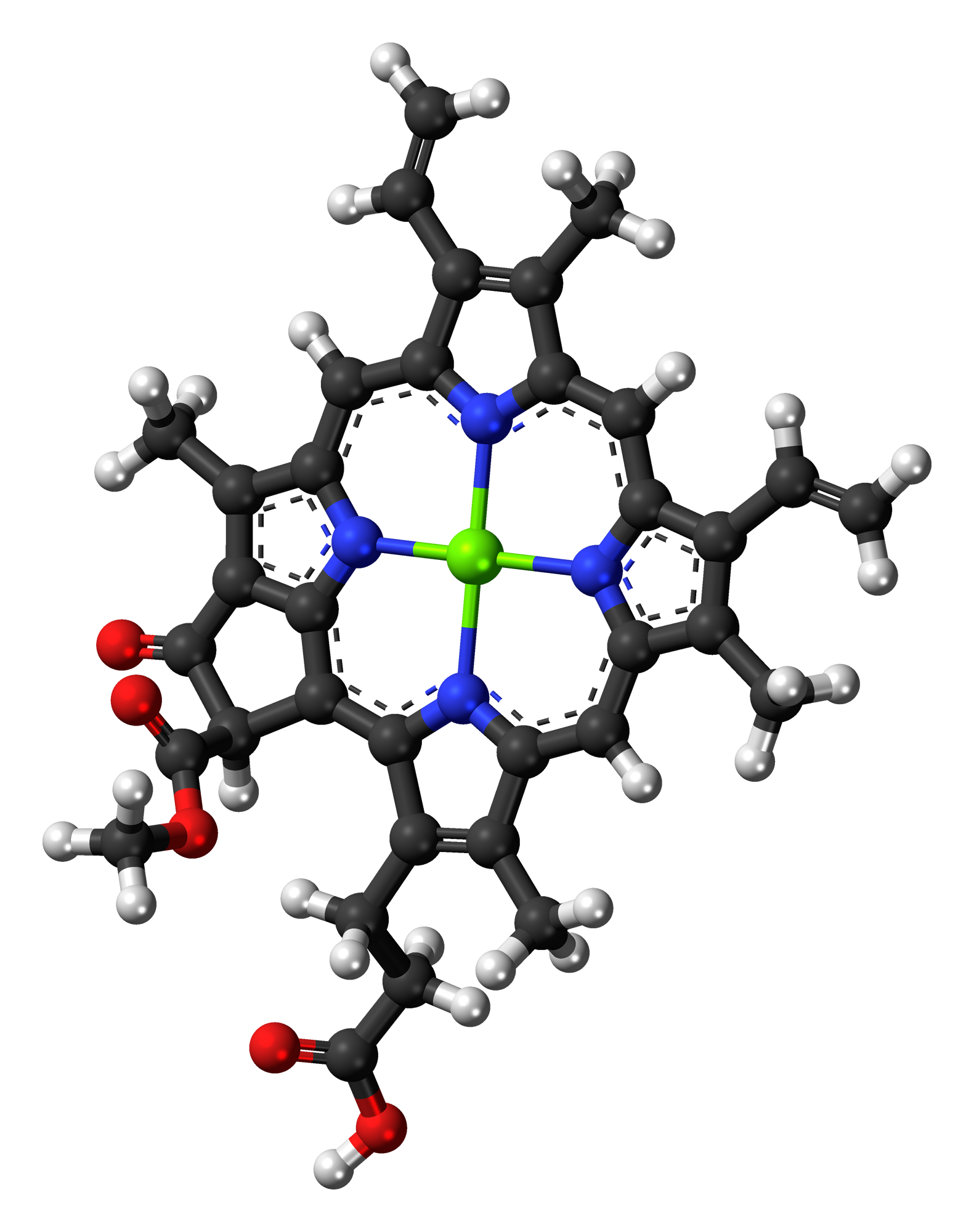

Names
- IUPAC name [(2E)-3-[21-(Methoxycarbonyl)-4,8,13,18-tetramethyl-20-oxo-9,14-divinyl-3,4-didehydro-3-phorbinyl-κ2N23,N25]acrylato(2-)]magnesium

Identifiers
CAS Number	27736-03-4
3D model (JSmol)	Interactive image; Interactive image
Beilstein Reference	5801049 6996841
ChEBI	CHEBI:38203
ChemSpider	21865346
PubChem CID	16070018
UNII	8GAP92KIWW
- InChI: InChI=1S/C35H30N4O5.Mg/c1-8-19-15(3)22-12-24-17(5)21(10-11-28(40)41)32(38-24)30-31(35(43)44-7)34(42)29-18(6)25(39-33(29)30)14-27-20(9-2)16(4)23(37-27)13-26(19)36-22;/h8-14,31H,1-2H2,3-7H3,(H3,36,37,38,39,40,41,42);/q;+2/p-2/b11-10+,22-12?,23-13?,24-12?,25-14?,26-13?,27-14?,32-30?; Key: QDRBYWCRXZZVLY-JUQUGTHISA-L
- SMILES: CC1=C(C2=CC3=NC(=CC4=C(C5=C([N-]4)C(=C6C(=C(C(=N6)C=C1[N-]2)C)C=CC(=O)O)C(C5=O)C(=O)OC)C)C(=C3C)C=C)C=C.[Mg+2]; COC(=O)C9C(=O)c6c(C)c3n7c6c9c2c(C=CC(=O)O)c(C)c1cc5n8c(cc4n([Mg]78n12)c(c=3)c(C=C)c4c)c(C=C)c5C

Properties
Chemical formula	C_{35}H_{28}MgN_{4}O_{5}
Molar mass	608.937 g·mol^{−1}
- Except where otherwise noted, data are given for materials in their standard state (at 25 °C [77 °F], 100 kPa). verify (what is ?) Infobox references

Chlorophyll c_{3}

Identifiers
CAS Number	111308-93-1
3D model (JSmol)	Interactive image
ChemSpider	32699592
PubChem CID	71587417
UNII	FMN10170B8
- InChI: InChI=1S/C36H30N4O7.Mg/c1-8-18-15(3)21-12-22-16(4)20(10-11-27(41)42)32(39-22)30-31(36(45)47-7)34(43)28-17(5)23(40-33(28)30)13-25-19(9-2)29(35(44)46-6)26(38-25)14-24(18)37-21;/h8-14,31,38,43H,1-2H2,3-7H3,(H,41,42);/q;+2/p-2/b11-10+,21-12?,25-13?,26-14?,32-30?;/t31-;/m1./s1 Key: CWLZENTWIZFJMW-XUGDHDJXSA-L
- SMILES: CC1=C(C2=NC1=CC3=NC(=C4C(C(=C5C4=NC(=C5C)C=C6C(=C(C(=C2)N6)C(=O)OC)C=C)[O-])C(=O)OC)C(=C3C)C=CC(=O)[O-])C=C.[Mg+2]

Properties
Chemical formula	C_{36}H_{28}MgN_{4}O_{7}
Molar mass	652.946 g·mol^{−1}
- Except where otherwise noted, data are given for materials in their standard state (at 25 °C [77 °F], 100 kPa). Infobox references
