= C20H40O =

The molecular formula C_{20}H_{40}O (molar mass: 296.53 g/mol, exact mass: 296.3079 u) may refer to:

- Isophytol
- Phytol
