= Protochlorophyllide reductase =

Class of enzymes

light-dependent protochlorophyllide reductase

Identifiers
- EC no.: 1.3.1.33
- CAS no.: 68518-04-7

Databases
- BRENDA: enzyme data
- ExPASy: NiceZyme view
- KEGG: enzyme entry
- MetaCyc: metabolic pathway
- Rhea: reactions
- PDB structures: RCSB PDB PDBe PDBsum
- Gene Ontology: AmiGO / QuickGO
Search
- PMC: articles
- PubMed: articles
- NCBI: proteins

The reduction of ring D of protochlorophyllide completes the biosynthesis of chlorophyllide a

light-independent protochlorophyllide reductase
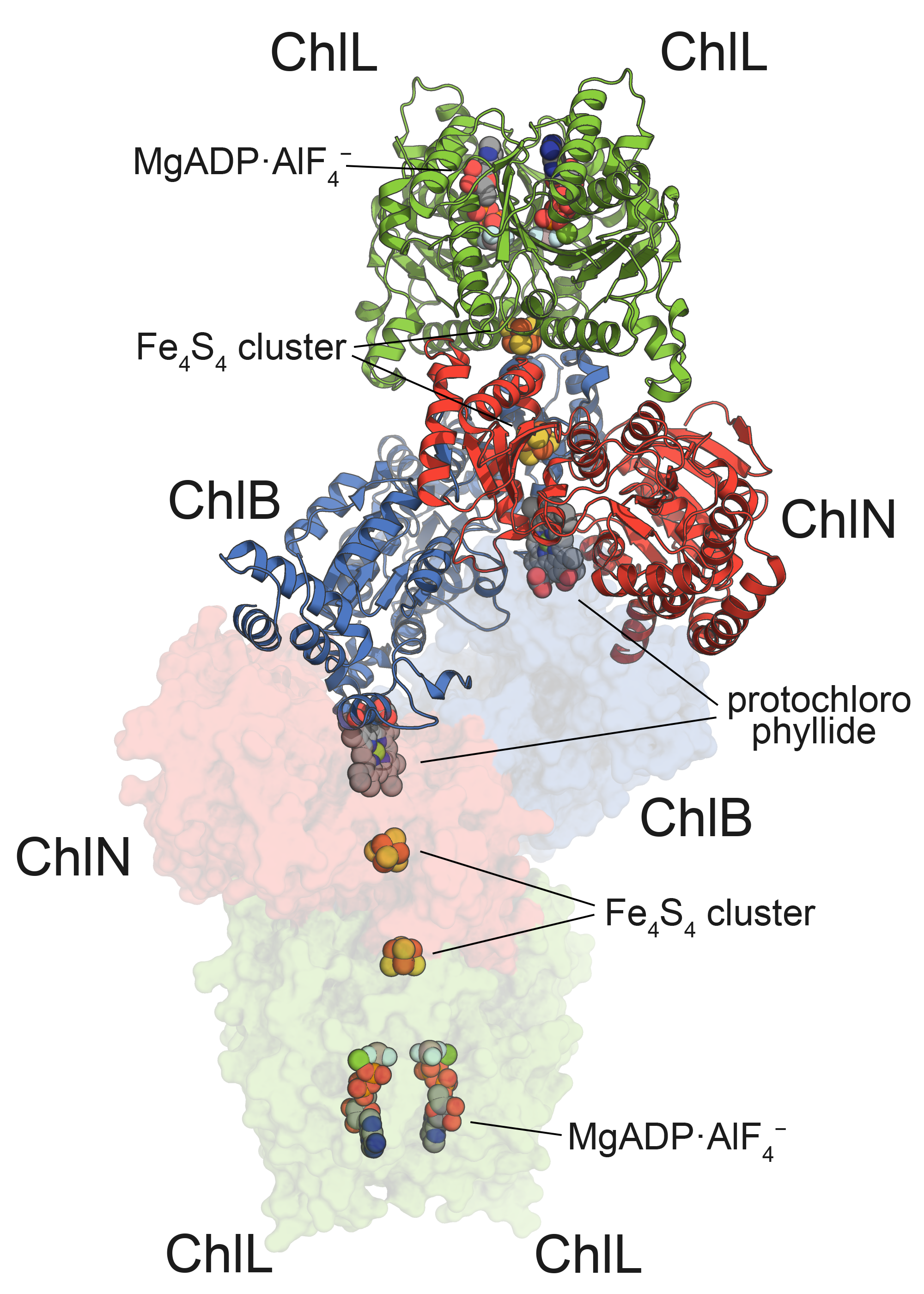
- Crystallographic structure of heterooctamer of a dark-operative protochlorophyllide oxidoreductase from Prochlorococcus marinus.

Identifiers
- EC no.: 1.3.7.7

Databases
- BRENDA: enzyme data
- ExPASy: NiceZyme view
- KEGG: enzyme entry
- MetaCyc: metabolic pathway
- Rhea: reactions
- PDB structures: RCSB PDB PDBe PDBsum
Search
- PMC: articles
- PubMed: articles
- NCBI: proteins

In enzymology, protochlorophyllide reductases (POR) are enzymes that catalyze the conversion from protochlorophyllide to chlorophyllide a. They are oxidoreductases participating in the biosynthetic pathway to chlorophylls.

There are two structurally unrelated proteins with this sort of activity, referred to as light-dependent (LPOR) and dark-operative (DPOR). The light- and NADPH-dependent reductase is part of the short-chain dehydrogenase/reductase (SDR) superfamily and is found in plants and oxygenic photosynthetic bacteria, while the ATP-dependent dark-operative version is a completely different protein, consisting of three subunits that exhibit significant sequence and quaternary structure similarity to the three subunits of nitrogenase. This enzyme may be evolutionary older; due to its bound iron-sulfur clusters is highly sensitive to free oxygen and does not function if the atmospheric oxygen concentration exceeds about 3%. It is possible that evolutionary pressure associated with the great oxidation event resulted in the development of the light-dependent system.

The light-dependent version (EC 1.3.1.33) uses NADPH:

protochlorophyllide + NADPH + H^{+} $\rightleftharpoons$ chlorophyllide a + NADP^{+}

While the light-independent or dark-operative version (EC 1.3.7.7) uses ATP and ferredoxin:

protochlorophyllide a + reduced ferredoxin + 2 ATP + 2 H2O = chlorophyllide a + oxidized ferredoxin + 2 ADP + 2 phosphate

== Light-dependent ==
The light-dependent version has the accepted name protochlorophyllide reductase. The systematic name is chlorophyllide-a :NADP+ 7,8-oxidoreductase. Other names in common use include NADPH2-protochlorophyllide oxidoreductase, NADPH-protochlorophyllide oxidoreductase, NADPH-protochlorophyllide reductase, protochlorophyllide oxidoreductase, and protochlorophyllide photooxidoreductase.

LPOR is one of only three known light-dependent enzymes. The enzyme enables light-dependent protochlorophyllide reduction via direct local hydride transfer from NADPH and a longer-range proton transfer along a defined structural pathway. LPOR is a ~40kDa monomeric enzyme, for which the structure has been solved by X-ray crystallography. It is part of the SDR superfamily, which includes alcohol dehydrogenase, and consists of a Rossman-fold NADPH-binding site and a substrate-specific C-terminal segment region. The protochlorophyllide substrate is thought to bind to a cavity near the nicotinamide end of the bound NADPH. LPOR is primarily found in plants and oxygenic photosynthetic bacteria, as well as in some algae.

== Light-independent ==
The light-independent version has the accepted name of ferredoxin:protochlorophyllide reductase (ATP-dependent). Systematically it is known as ATP-dependent ferredoxin:protochlorophyllide-a 7,8-oxidoreductase. Other names in common use include light-independent protochlorophyllide reductase and dark-operative protochlorophyllide reductase (DPOR).

DPOR is a nitrogenase homologue and adopts an almost identical overall architecture arrangement to both nitrogenase as well as the downstream chlorophyllide a reductase (COR). The enzyme consists of a catalytic heterotetramer and two transiently-bound ATPase dimers (right). Similar to nitrogenase, the reduction mechanism relies on an electron transfer from the iron-sulfur cluster of the ATPase domain, through a secondary cluster on the catalytic heterotetramer and finally to the protochlorophyllide-bound active site (which, distinct from nitrogenase, does not contain FeMoco). The reduction requires significantly less input than the nitrogenase reaction, requiring only a 2-electron reduction and 4 ATP equivalents, and as such may require an auto-inhibitory mechanism to avoid over-activity.

DPOR can alternatively take as its substrate the compound with a second vinyl group (instead of an ethyl group) in the structure, in which case the reaction is

3,8-divinylprotochlorophyllide + reduced ferredoxin + 2 ATP + 2 H_{2}O $\rightleftharpoons$ 3,8-divinylchlorophyllide a + oxidized ferredoxin + 2 ADP + 2 phosphate

This enzyme is present in photosynthetic bacteria, cyanobacteria, green algae and gymnosperms.

== See also ==
- Biosynthesis of chlorophylls
