= Chlorophyll(ide) b reductase =

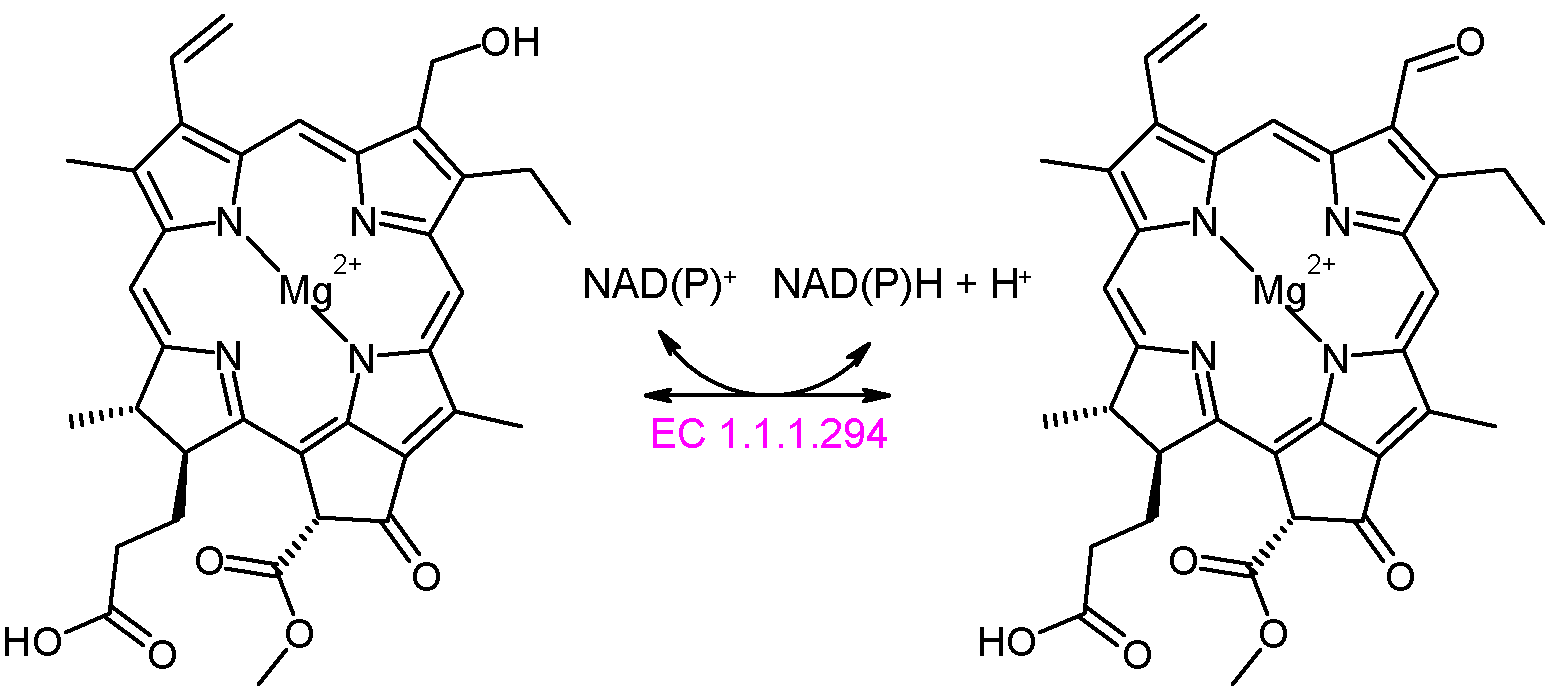

Identifiers
- EC no.: 1.1.1.294

Databases
- IntEnz: IntEnz view
- BRENDA: BRENDA entry
- ExPASy: NiceZyme view
- KEGG: KEGG entry
- MetaCyc: metabolic pathway
- PRIAM: profile
- PDB structures: RCSB PDB PDBe PDBsum
Search
- PMC: articles
- PubMed: articles
- NCBI: proteins

Chlorophyll(ide) b reductase (EC 1.1.1.294), chlorophyll b reductase, Chl b reductase) is an enzyme with systematic name 7^{1}-hydroxychlorophyllide-a:NAD(P)^{+} oxidoreductase. This enzyme catalyses the following chemical reaction

7^{1}-hydroxychlorophyllide a + NAD(P)^{+} $\rightleftharpoons$ chlorophyllide b + NAD(P)H + H^{+}

This enzyme carries out the first step in the conversion of chlorophyll b to chlorophyll a. It is involved in chlorophyll degradation, which occurs during leaf senescence, and it also forms part of the chlorophyll cycle, which interconverts chlorophyll a and b in response to changing light conditions.
