= C55H70MgN4O6 =

The molecular formula C_{55}H_{70}MgN_{4}O_{6} (molar mass: 907.49 g/mol, exact mass: 906.5146 u) may refer to:

- Chlorophyll_b
- Chlorophyll_f
