= Magnesium-protoporphyrin IX monomethyl ester (oxidative) cyclase =

Class of enzymes

Identifiers
- EC no.: 1.14.13.81
- CAS no.: 92353-62-3

Databases
- IntEnz: IntEnz view
- BRENDA: BRENDA entry
- ExPASy: NiceZyme view
- KEGG: KEGG entry
- MetaCyc: metabolic pathway
- PRIAM: profile
- PDB structures: RCSB PDB PDBe PDBsum
Search
- PMC: articles
- PubMed: articles
- NCBI: proteins

Magnesium-protoporphyrin IX monomethyl ester (oxidative) cyclase (EC 1.14.13.81), is an enzyme with systematic name magnesium-protoporphyrin-IX 13-monomethyl ester, ferredoxin:oxygen oxidoreductase (hydroxylating). In plants this enzyme catalyses the following overall chemical reaction

The chlorin ring system forms as the esterified propionate sidechain is cyclised on to the porphyrin ring of protoporphyrin IX to form divinylprotochlorophyllide

magnesium-protoporphyrin IX 13-monomethyl ester + 3 NADPH + 3 H^{+} + 3 O_{2} $\rightleftharpoons$ divinylprotochlorophyllide + 3 NADP^{+} + 5 H_{2}O (overall reaction)

Recent evidence shows that the necessary electrons which cycle the enzyme from oxidised to reduced form come from ferredoxin. In green tissue, ferredoxin can receive these electrons directly from photosystem I so that NADPH need not be involved. However, in the dark, ferredoxin can also be reduced via Ferredoxin—NADP(+) reductase, allowing the reaction to proceed in that case. It is therefore more accurate to show the individual steps as follows:

(1a) magnesium-protoporphyrin IX 13-monomethyl ester + 2 reduced ferredoxin + O_{2} $\rightleftharpoons$ 13^{1}-hydroxy-magnesium-protoporphyrin IX 13-monomethyl ester + H_{2}O
(1b) 13^{1}-hydroxy-magnesium-protoporphyrin IX 13-monomethyl ester + 2 reduced ferredoxin + O_{2} $\rightleftharpoons$ 13^{1}-oxo-magnesium-protoporphyrin IX 13-monomethyl ester + 2 H_{2}O
(1c) 13^{1}-oxo-magnesium-protoporphyrin IX 13-monomethyl ester + 2 reduced ferredoxin + O_{2} $\rightleftharpoons$ divinylprotochlorophyllide + 2 H_{2}O

This enzyme requires Fe(II) for activity. In barley the cyclase protein is named XanL and is encoded by the Xantha-l gene. An associated protein, Ycf54, seems to be required for proper maturation of the XanL enzyme, which is part of the biosynthetic pathway to chlorophylls. In anaerobic organisms such as Rhodobacter sphaeroides the same overall transformation occurs but the oxygen incorporated into magnesium-protoporphyrin IX 13-monomethyl ester comes from water in the reaction EC 1.21.98.3.

== See also ==
- Biosynthesis of chlorophylls
