= Magnesium protoporphyrin IX methyltransferase =

Enzymatic biochemical catalyst

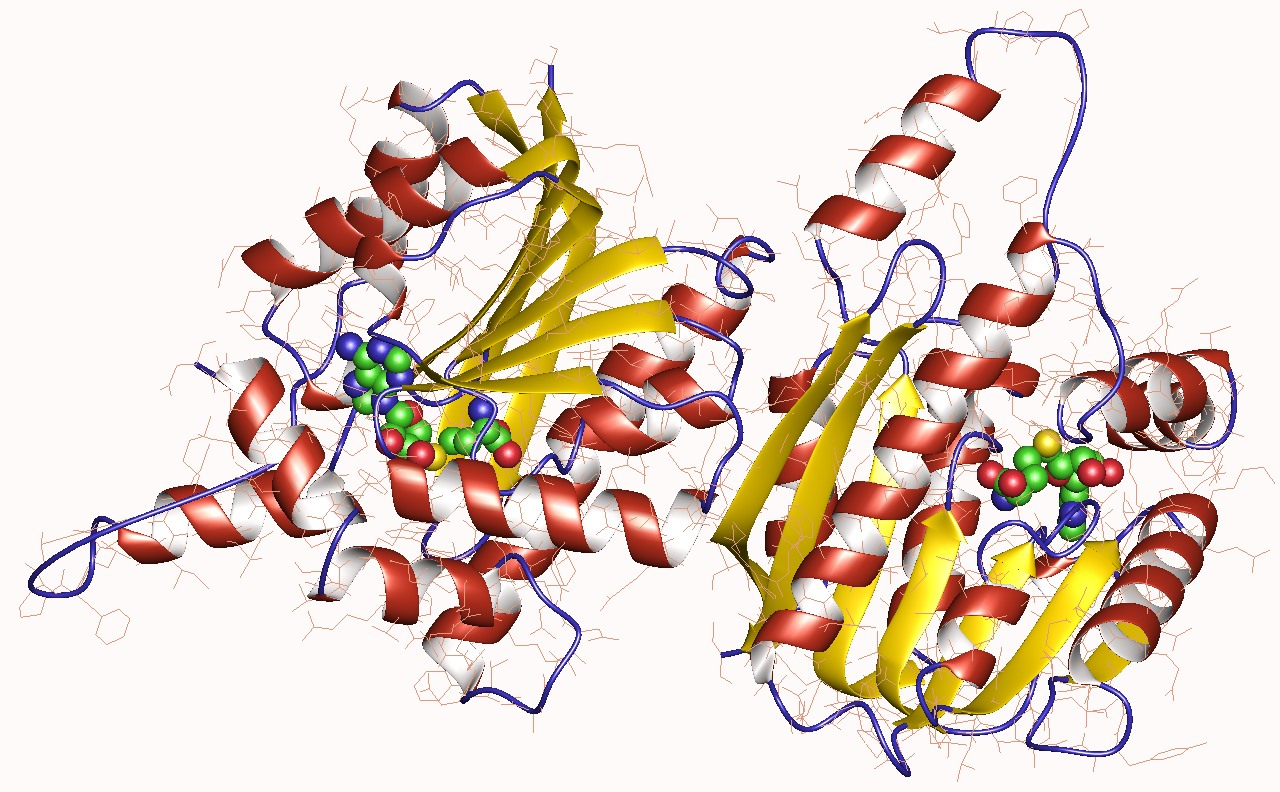
- Magnesium protoporphyrin IX O-methyltransferase homodimer, Synechocystis

Identifiers
- EC no.: 2.1.1.11
- CAS no.: 9029-82-7

Databases
- IntEnz: IntEnz view
- BRENDA: BRENDA entry
- ExPASy: NiceZyme view
- KEGG: KEGG entry
- MetaCyc: metabolic pathway
- PRIAM: profile
- PDB structures: RCSB PDB PDBe PDBsum
- Gene Ontology: AmiGO / QuickGO
Search
- PMC: articles
- PubMed: articles
- NCBI: proteins

Magnesium protoporphyrin IX methyltransferase (EC 2.1.1.11) is an enzyme that catalyzes the chemical reaction

magnesium protoporphyrin
+ SAM
magnesium protoporphyrin 13-monomethyl ester
+ SAH

This is a methylation reaction in which one of the two carboxylic acid groups in magnesium protoporphyrin is converted to a methyl ester. The methyl group comes from the cofactor, S-adenosyl methionine (SAM), which becomes S-adenosyl-L-homocysteine (SAH).

This enzyme belongs to the family of transferases, specifically those transferring one-carbon group methyltransferases. The systematic name of this enzyme class is S-adenosyl-L-methionine:magnesium-protoporphyrin-IX O-methyltransferase. This enzyme is part of the biosynthetic pathway to chlorophylls.

== See also ==
- Biosynthesis of chlorophylls
