= PI curve =

Relationship between solar irradiance and photosynthesis

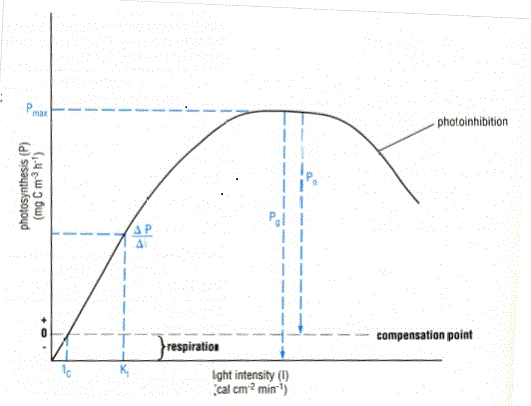
P v I curve

The PI (or photosynthesis-irradiance) curve is a graphical representation of the empirical relationship between solar irradiance and photosynthesis. A derivation of the Michaelis–Menten curve, it shows the generally positive correlation between light intensity and photosynthetic rate. It is a plot of photosynthetic rate as a function of light intensity (irradiance).

== Introduction ==
The PI curve can be applied to terrestrial and marine reactions but is most commonly used to explain ocean-dwelling phytoplankton's photosynthetic response to changes in light intensity. Using this tool to approximate biological productivity is important because phytoplankton contribute ~50% of total global carbon fixation and are important suppliers to the marine food web.

Within the scientific community, the curve can be referred to as the PI, PE or Light Response Curve. While individual researchers may have their own preferences, all are readily acceptable for use in the literature. Regardless of nomenclature, the photosynthetic rate in question can be described in terms of carbon (C) fixed per unit per time. Since individuals vary in size, it is also useful to normalise C concentration to Chlorophyll a (an important photosynthetic pigment) to account for specific biomass.

== History ==
As far back as 1905, marine researchers attempted to develop an equation to be used as the standard in establishing the relationship between solar irradiance and photosynthetic production. Several groups had relative success, but in 1976 a comparison study conducted by Alan Jassby and Trevor Platt, researchers at the Bedford Institute of Oceanography in Dartmouth, Nova Scotia, reached a conclusion that solidified the way in which a PI curve is developed. After evaluating the eight most-used equations, Jassby and Platt argued that the PI curve can be best approximated by a hyperbolic tangent function, at least until photoinhibition is reached.

Subsequent work by Platt and colleagues extended the model to include photoinhibition using an exponential decay term, which became the dominant approach for the next several decades. However, analyses of large global datasets later revealed that this exponential formulation often underestimated the plateau region of photosynthesis and misrepresented the shape of inhibition. In 2025, Amirian, Devred, Finkel, and Irwin introduced a double-tanh formulation, known as Amirian model, that models photoinhibition as a saturating function of the reciprocal of irradiance. In comparisons against 16 alternative photoinhibition models, Amirian-tanh consistently outperformed existing approaches, capturing the initial light-limited slope, the photosynthetic plateau, and high-light inhibition within a single parsimonious framework .

== Equations ==
Two classical formulations have been used for decades to study PI curves: a hyperbolic saturation model and an exponential photoinhibition model. Both provide useful approximations but historically failed to represent the complete range of observed light–response behavior.

=== Hyperbolic saturation (rectangular hyperbola) ===
The simplest formulation assumes photosynthesis increases with light until a maximum rate is reached and then remains constant:

$$P = \frac{P_{\max} I}{K_I + I}$$

where:

- $P$ : photosynthetic rate, $\text{mgC} (\text{mg Chla})^{-1} h^{-1}$ at irradiance $I, (\text{Watts m}^{-2})$
- $P_{\max}$ : the maximum potential photosynthetic rate with the same unit as P,
- $K_I$ :

the light intensity at which the photosynthetic rate proceeds at $\frac{1}{2} P_{\max}$, also known as half-saturation constant with the same unit as I;

Both Pmax and the initial slope of the curve, ΔP/ΔI, are species-specific, and are influenced by a variety of factors, such as nutrient concentration, temperature and the physiological capabilities of the individual. Light intensity is influenced by latitudinal position and undergo daily and seasonal fluxes which will also affect the overall photosynthetic capacity of the individual. These three parameters are predictable and can be used to predetermine the general PI curve a population should follow.

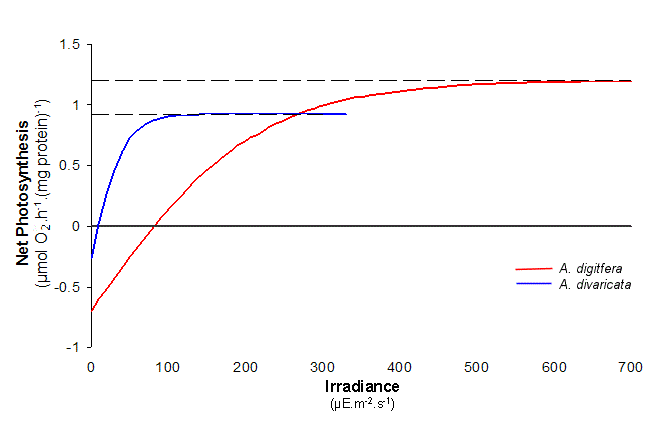

As can be seen in the graph, two species can have different responses to the same incremental changes in light intensity. Population A (in blue) has an initial rate higher than that of Population B (in red) and also exhibits a stronger rate change to increased light intensities at lower irradiance. Therefore, Population A will dominate in an environment with lower light availability. Although Population B has a slower photosynthetic response to increases in light intensity its Pmax is higher than that of Population A. This allows for eventual population dominance at greater light intensities. There are many determining factors influencing population success; using the PI curve to elicit predictions of rate flux to environmental changes is useful for monitoring phytoplankton bloom dynamics and ecosystem stability.

This rectangular–hyperbola form captures the light-limited rise in photosynthesis but fails to describe the plateau transition and decline under very high light (photoinhibition).

=== Exponential photoinhibition ===
In the upper few meters of the ocean, phytoplankton may be subjected to irradiance levels that damage the chlorophyll-a pigment inside the cell, subsequently decreasing photosynthetic rate. The response curve depicts photoinhibition as a decrease in photosynthetic rate at light intensities stronger than those necessary for achievement of $P_{\max}$.

To include the decline in photosynthesis under excessive irradiance, Steele proposed using a linear function is multiplied by an exponential decay term—a gamma distribution functional type with shape and scale parameter of 1--to represent photoinhibition. His model uses only two parameters, Pmax and α, where α accounts for both the initial slope of the light-saturation curve at low irradiance and photoinhibition at high irradiance, compromising the model's goodness fit.

Platt and colleagues introduced an exponential model to model the PI curve with photoinhibition:

$$P = P_{s} (1 - e^{-\alpha I/P_s})e^{-\beta I/P_s} \,$$

where $\alpha$ is the initial slope (photosynthetic efficiency), $P_s$ is theoretical maximum photosynthesis rate, and $\beta$ is the photoinhibition parameter. This model successfully introduced photoinhibition, but in practice it cannot reproduce the plateau region often observed in field P–I data and tends to overestimate $P_{\max}$ because of parameter interdependence.

=== Amirian model (double-tanh, 2025) ===
To address these limitations, Amirian and colleagues suggested using a saturating function of the reciprocal of irradiance to model photoinhibition, and then proposed the Amirian–tanh model: a smooth double–tanh function that unifies all three light–response phases—light-limitation, saturation plateau, and photoinhibition.

$$P(I) = P_{\max}
\tanh\!\left(\frac{\alpha I}{P_{\max}}\right)
\tanh\!\left(\!\left(\frac{P_{\max}}{\beta I}\right)^\gamma \right)
- R,
\quad \gamma = \cosh^2(1) \approx 2.38$$

where:

- $P_{\max}$ : maximum photosynthetic rate,
- $\alpha$ : initial slope (light-use efficiency),
- $\beta$ : photoinhibition rate,
- $R$ : respiration or dark-fixation rate.

This model accurately reproduces the plateau region, eliminates the parameter cross-correlation problems of exponential models, and converges automatically to a standard tanh-type curve when photoinhibition is absent ($\beta = 0$). When applied to ~4,000 historical ^{14}C P–I curves, the Amirian model outperformed all the existing formulations in both fit quality and parameter stability, improving adjusted R^{2} by 6–37% and reduces RMSE by 15–70%.

Because it provides a continuous and biologically interpretable representation of photosynthesis under variable light conditions, the Amirian model has become a new standard framework for modeling marine phytoplankton photophysiology. It is implemented as the default photoinhibition model (identifier "Ph10") in the open-source R package piCurve .

== Examples ==
The hyperbolic response between photosynthesis and irradiance, depicted by the PI curve, is important for assessing phytoplankton population dynamics, which influence many aspects of the marine environment.
