= Chlorophyllide-a oxygenase =

Class of enzymes

Identifiers
- EC no.: 1.14.13.122
- CAS no.: 216503-73-0

Databases
- IntEnz: IntEnz view
- BRENDA: BRENDA entry
- ExPASy: NiceZyme view
- KEGG: KEGG entry
- MetaCyc: metabolic pathway
- PRIAM: profile
- PDB structures: RCSB PDB PDBe PDBsum
Search
- PMC: articles
- PubMed: articles
- NCBI: proteins

Chlorophyllide-a oxygenase (EC 1.14.13.122), chlorophyllide a oxygenase, chlorophyll-b synthase, CAO) is an enzyme with systematic name chlorophyllide-a:oxygen 7-oxidoreductase. This enzyme catalyses the following overall chemical reaction

chlorophyllide a
+ 2 NADPH
+ 2 O_{2}
2 H^{+}
3 H_{2}O
chlorophyllide a
+ 2 NADP^{+}

The oxidation reaction uses molecular oxygen with nicotinamide adenine dinucleotide phosphate (NADPH) as a cofactor.

Chlorophyllide a, (R=H) is converted to chlorophyllide b, in which the methyl group show in the green box is oxidised to a formyl group.

This enzyme contains a mononuclear iron centre and is part of the biosynthetic pathway to chlorophylls.

== See also ==
- Biosynthesis of chlorophylls
