= Divinyl chlorophyllide a 8-vinyl-reductase =

Class of enzymes

Identifiers
- EC no.: 1.3.1.75

Databases
- IntEnz: IntEnz view
- BRENDA: BRENDA entry
- ExPASy: NiceZyme view
- KEGG: KEGG entry
- MetaCyc: metabolic pathway
- PRIAM: profile
- PDB structures: RCSB PDB PDBe PDBsum
Search
- PMC: articles
- PubMed: articles
- NCBI: proteins

In enzymology, divinyl chlorophyllide a 8-vinyl-reductase (EC 1.3.1.75) is an enzyme that catalyzes the chemical reaction

3,8-divinylprotochlorophyllide + NADPH + H^{+} $\rightleftharpoons$ protochlorophyllide + NADP^{+}

The three substrates of this enzyme are 3,8-divinylprotochlorophyllide, NADPH, and H^{+}; its two products are protochlorophyllide and NADP^{+}. This enzyme can also convert alternative substrates, for example 3,8-divinyl chlorophyllide a and in all cases reduces a single specific vinyl group to an ethyl group.

This enzyme belongs to the family of oxidoreductases. The systematic name of this enzyme class is chlorophyllide-a :NADP+ oxidoreductase. Other names in common use include 3,8-divinyl protochlorophyllide a 8-vinyl-reductase, [4-vinyl]chlorophyllide a reductase, and 4VCR. This enzyme is part of the biosynthetic pathway to chlorophylls.

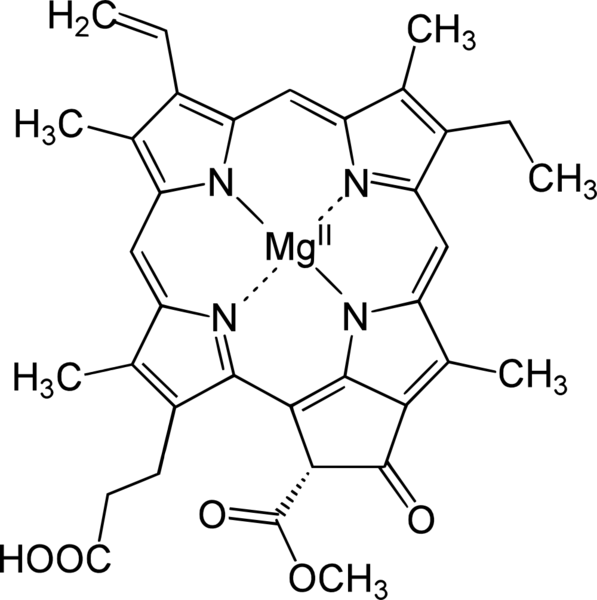
Protochlorophyllide, the product of the reaction

== See also ==
- Biosynthesis of chlorophylls
