= 7-Hydroxymethyl chlorophyll a reductase =

Class of enzymes

Identifiers
- EC no.: 1.17.7.2

Databases
- IntEnz: IntEnz view
- BRENDA: BRENDA entry
- ExPASy: NiceZyme view
- KEGG: KEGG entry
- MetaCyc: metabolic pathway
- PRIAM: profile
- PDB structures: RCSB PDB PDBe PDBsum
Search
- PMC: articles
- PubMed: articles
- NCBI: proteins

7-Hydroxymethyl chlorophyll a reductase (EC 1.17.7.2, HCAR) is an enzyme with systematic name 71-hydroxychlorophyll a:ferredoxin oxidoreductase. This enzyme catalyses the following chemical reaction

71-hydroxychlorophyll a + 2 reduced ferredoxin + 2 H^{+} $\rightleftharpoons$ chlorophyll a + 2 oxidized ferredoxin + H_{2}O

7-Hydroxymethyl chlorophyll is a reductase that contains FAD and an iron-sulfur center.
