= Chlorophyllide a reductase =

Enzyme

Identifiers
- EC no.: 1.3.7.15

Databases
- BRENDA: enzyme data
- ExPASy: NiceZyme view
- KEGG: enzyme entry
- MetaCyc: metabolic pathway
- Rhea: reactions
- PDB structures: RCSB PDB PDBe PDBsum
Search
- PMC: articles
- PubMed: articles
- NCBI: proteins

Chlorophyllide a reductase (EC 1.3.7.15), also known as COR, is an enzyme with systematic name bacteriochlorophyllide-a:ferredoxin 7,8-oxidoreductase. It catalyses the following chemical reaction

chlorophyllide a
+ 2 reduced ferredoxin
+ ATP + 2 H^{+}
H_{2}O
P_{i}
3-vinylbacteriochlorophyllide a
+ 2 oxidised ferredoxin
+ ADP

This reduction, (with trans stereochemistry) of the sidechains in the pyrrole ring, gives the characteristic 18-electron aromatic system that distinguishes bacteriochlorophylls from chlorophylls, which retain the chlorin system of chlorophyllide a. The enzyme uses ferredoxin and adenosine triphosphate as cofactors and gives adenosine diphosphate and phosphate (P_{i}) as byproducts.

This enzyme is present in purple bacteria such as Rhodobacter capsulatus and Rhodobacter sphaeroides, and Pseudomonadota. It is a component of the biosynthetic pathway to bacteriochlorophylls.

== See also ==
- Biosynthesis of bacteriochlorophylls
