= Chlorin =

Names
- IUPAC name 2,3-Dihydroporphyrin
- Other names 2,3-Dihydroporphine

Identifiers
CAS Number	2683-84-3
3D model (JSmol)	Interactive image
ChEBI	CHEBI:36303
ChemSpider	58616
PubChem CID	65106
CompTox Dashboard (EPA)	DTXSID30893669
- InChI: InChI=1S/C20H16N4/c1-2-14-10-16-5-6-18(23-16)12-20-8-7-19(24-20)11-17-4-3-15(22-17)9-13(1)21-14/h1-6,9-12,22-23H,7-8H2/b13-9-,14-10-,15-9-,16-10-,17-11-,18-12-,19-11-,20-12- Key: UGADAJMDJZPKQX-CEVVSZFKSA-N; InChI=1/C20H16N4/c1-2-14-10-16-5-6-18(23-16)12-20-8-7-19(24-20)11-17-4-3-15(22-17)9-13(1)21-14/h1-6,9-12,22-23H,7-8H2/b13-9-,14-10-,15-9-,16-10-,17-11-,18-12-,19-11-,20-12- Key: UGADAJMDJZPKQX-CEVVSZFKBJ
- SMILES: C(N1)(/C=C2N=C(C=C\2)/C=C3N/C(C=C\3)=C\4)=CC=C1/C=C5CCC4=N/5

Properties
Chemical formula	C_{20}H_{16}N_{4}
Molar mass	312.36784
- Except where otherwise noted, data are given for materials in their standard state (at 25 °C [77 °F], 100 kPa). verify (what is ?) Infobox references

In organic chemistry, chlorins are tetrapyrrole pigments that are partially hydrogenated porphyrins. The parent chlorin is an unstable compound which undergoes air oxidation to porphine. The name chlorin derives from chlorophyll. Chlorophylls are magnesium-containing chlorins and occur as photosynthetic pigments in chloroplasts. The term "chlorin" strictly speaking refers to only compounds with the same ring oxidation state as chlorophyll.

Chlorins are excellent photosensitizing agents. Various synthetic chlorins analogues such as m-tetrahydroxyphenylchlorin (mTHPC) and mono-L-aspartyl chlorin e6 are effectively employed in experimental photodynamic therapy as photosensitizer.

== Chlorophylls ==
The most abundant chlorin is the photosynthetic pigment chlorophyll. Chlorophylls have a fifth, ketone-containing ring unlike the chlorins. Diverse chlorophylls exists, such as chlorophyll a, chlorophyll b, chlorophyll d, chlorophyll e, chlorophyll f, and chlorophyll g. Chlorophylls usually feature magnesium as a central metal atom, replacing the two NH centers in the parent.

== Variation ==
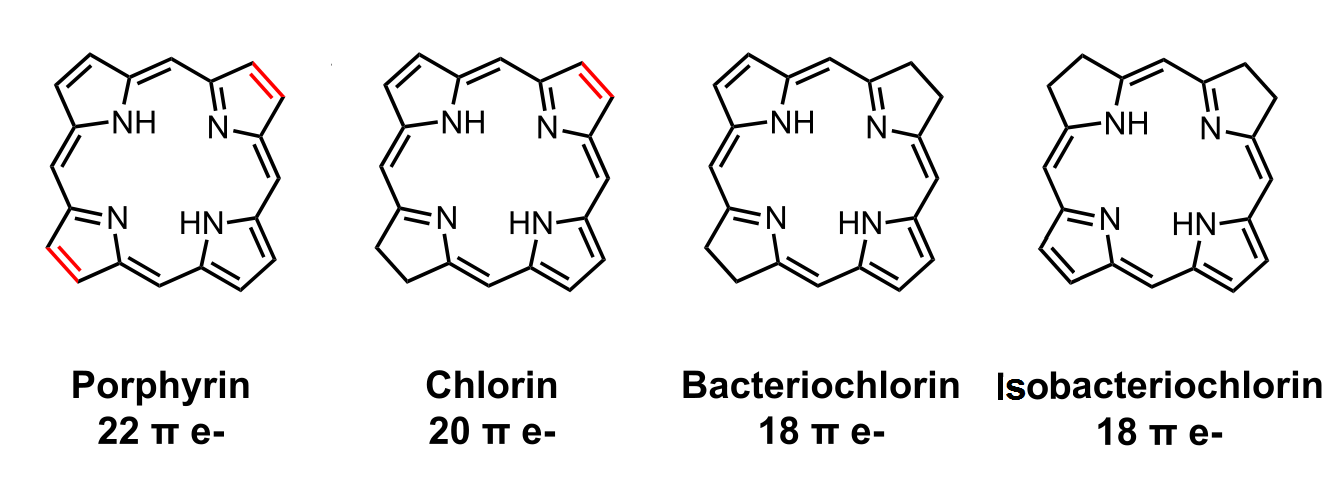
Structures comparing porphin, chlorin, bacteriochlorin, and isobacteriochlorin

Microbes produce two reduced variants of chlorin, bacteriochlorins and isobacteriochlorins. Bacteriochlorins are found in some bacteriochlorophylls; the ring structure is produced by Chlorophyllide a reductase (COR) reducing a chlorin ring at the C7-8 double bond. Isobacteriochlorins are found in nature mostly as sirohydrochlorin, a biosynthetic intermediate of vitamin B_{12}, produced without going through a chlorin. In living organisms, both are ultimately derived from uroporphyrinogen III, a near-universal intermediate in tetrapyrrole biosynthesis.

== Synthetic chlorins ==
Numerous synthetic chlorins with different functional groups and/or ring modifications have been examined.

Contracted chlorins can be synthesised by reduction of B(III)subporphyrin or by oxidation of corresponding B(III)subbacteriochlorin. The B(III)subchlorins were directly synthesized as meso-ester B(III)subchlorin from meso-diester tripyrromethane, these class of compound showed very good fluorescence quantum yield and singlet oxygen producing efficiency

== See also ==
- Corrin
- Photodynamic therapy
