= Dualex =

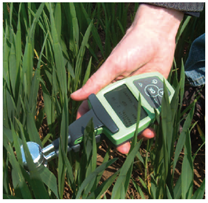
The Dualex is used to measure the flavonols and the chlorophyll contents of leaves.

The Dualex is an optical sensor used in plant science and agriculture for the assessment of flavonol, anthocyanin, and chlorophyll contents in leaves. This device allows researchers to perform real-time and non-destructive measurements of these important plant metabolites, which are crucial indicators of plant health and stress responses. Developed by Force-A (now out of business), the sensor is a result of technology transfer from the CNRS (National Center for Scientific Research) and University of Paris-Sud Orsay. It allows to make instant measurements without damaging the leaves. The main applications are plant sciences and agricultural research.

== Calculated parameters ==
The assessment of polyphenolic compounds in leaves is based on the absorbance of the leaf epidermis through the screening effect it procures to chlorophyll fluorescence. The parameters calculated by Dualex are:

- Anth, for the anthocyanin index
- Chl, for the chlorophyll content
- Flav, for the flavonols index
- NBI, for the nitrogen balance index

== Applications ==
Based on the four measured indices, this optical sensor is applied in the fields of research as follows:

- Plant physiology
- Genetic studies
- Plant phenology
- Herbal selection

It is equally applied in studies related to chlorophyll (nutritional chlorosis, potential photosynthesis), flavonols (UV protection, leaf light environment) and anthocyanins (temperature stress, light selection).
