= Protochlorophyllide =

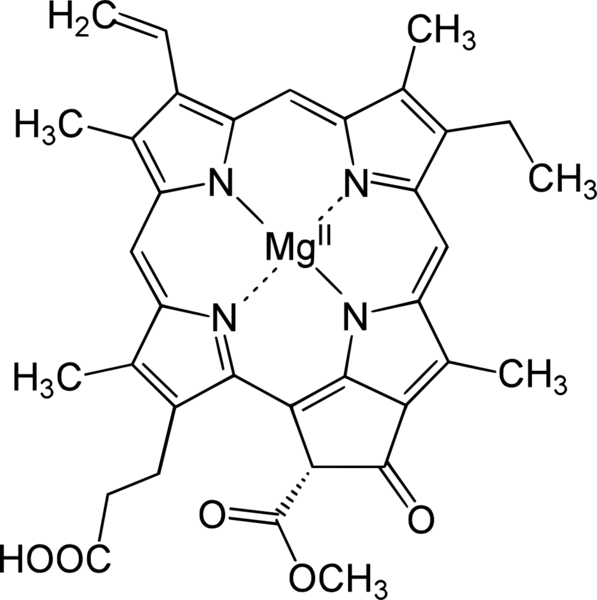

Names
- IUPAC name Magnesium (21R)-3-(2-carboxyethyl)-14-ethyl-21-(methoxycarbonyl)-4,8,13,18-tetramethyl-20-oxo-9-vinyl-3,4,23,25-tetradehydrophorbine-23,25-diide
- Other names Monovinyl protochlorophyllide

Identifiers
CAS Number	20369-67-9
3D model (JSmol)	Interactive image
ChEBI	CHEBI:16673
ChemSpider	388880
KEGG	C02880
PubChem CID	439833
- InChI: InChI=1S/C35H34N4O5.Mg/c1-8-19-15(3)22-12-24-17(5)21(10-11-28(40)41)32(38-24)30-31(35(43)44-7)34(42)29-18(6)25(39-33(29)30)14-27-20(9-2)16(4)23(37-27)13-26(19)36-22;/h8,12-14,31H,1,9-11H2,2-7H3,(H3,36,37,38,39,40,41,42);/q;+2/p-2/t31-;/m1./s1 Key: QBPCOMNNISRCTC-JSSVAETHSA-L
- SMILES: CCC1=C(C)C2=[N+]3C1=Cc1c(C)c4C(=O)[C@H](C(=O)OC)C5=C6C(CCC(O)=O)=C(C)C7=[N+]6[Mg--]3(n1c45)n1c(=C7)c(C)c(C=C)c1=C2

Properties
Chemical formula	C_{35}H_{32}MgN_{4}O_{5}
Molar mass	612.957 g/mol
- Except where otherwise noted, data are given for materials in their standard state (at 25 °C [77 °F], 100 kPa). Infobox references

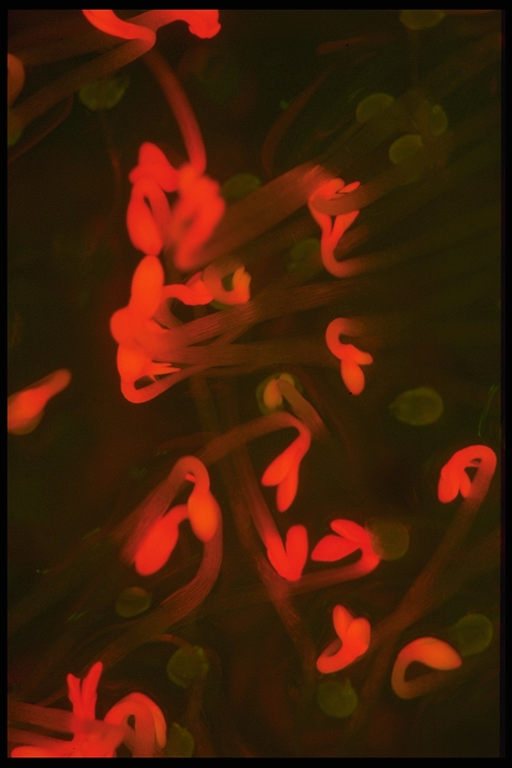
The Arabidopsis mutant (FLU), unable to control biosynthesis of protochlorophyllide, glows red in the blue light.

Protochlorophyllide, or monovinyl protochlorophyllide, is an intermediate in the biosynthesis of chlorophyll a. It lacks the phytol side-chain of chlorophyll and the reduced pyrrole in ring D. Protochlorophyllide is highly fluorescent; mutants that accumulate it glow red if irradiated with blue light. In angiosperms, the later steps which convert protochlorophyllide to chlorophyll are light-dependent, and such plants are pale (chlorotic) if grown in the darkness. Gymnosperms, algae, and photosynthetic bacteria have another, light-independent enzyme and grow green in the darkness as well.

== Conversion to chlorophyll ==
The enzyme that converts protochlorophyllide to chlorophyllide a, the next intermediate on the biosynthetic pathway, is protochlorophyllide reductase, EC 1.3.1.33. There are two structurally unrelated proteins with this activity: the light-dependent and the dark-operative. The light-dependent reductase needs light to operate. The dark-operative version is a completely different protein, consisting of three subunits that exhibit significant sequence similarity to the three subunits of nitrogenase, which catalyzes the formation of ammonia from dinitrogen. This enzyme might be evolutionary older but (being similar to nitrogenase) is highly sensitive to free oxygen and does not work if its concentration exceeds about 3%. Hence, the alternative, light-dependent version needed to evolve.

Most of the photosynthetic bacteria have both light-dependent and light-independent reductases. Angiosperms have lost the dark-operative form and rely on 3 slightly different copies of light-dependent version, frequently abbreviated as POR A, B, and C. Gymnosperms have much more copies of the similar gene (Loblolly pine has about 11 Loblolly Pine (Pinus taeda L.) Contains Multiple Expressed Genes Encoding Light-Dependent NADPH:Protochlorophyllide Oxidoreductase (POR)). In plants, POR is encoded in the cell nucleus and only later transported to its place of work, chloroplast. Unlike with POR, in plants and algae that have the dark-operative enzyme it is at least partially encoded in the chloroplast genome.

== Potential danger for plant ==
Chlorophyll itself is bound to proteins and can transfer the absorbed energy in the required direction. Protochlorophyllide, however, occurs mostly in the free form and, under light conditions, acts as a photosensitizer, forming highly toxic free radicals. Hence, plants need an efficient mechanism of regulating the amount of chlorophyll precursor. In angiosperms, this is done at the step of δ-aminolevulinic acid (ALA), one of the intermediate compounds in the biosynthetic pathway. Plants that are fed by ALA accumulate high and toxic levels of protochlorophyllide, as do mutants with a disrupted regulatory system.

Arabidopsis FLU mutant with damaged regulation can survive only under continuous darkness, as protochlorophyllide is not dangerous in the darkness, or under continuous light, in which the plant can convert all produced protochlorophyllide into chlorophyll and does not over-accumulate it despite the lack of regulation. In barley Tigrina mutant (mutated on the same gene), light kills the majority of the leaf tissue that has developed in the darkness, but part of the leaf that originated during the day survives. As a result, the leaves are covered by white stripes of necrotic regions, and the number of the white stripes is close to the age of the leaf in days. Green regions survive the subsequent nights, likely because the synthesis of chlorophyll in the mature leaf tissue is greatly reduced anyway.

== Biosynthesis regulatory protein FLU ==
In spite of numerous past attempts to find the mutant that overaccumulates protochlorophyllide under usual conditions, only one such gene (flu) is currently (2009) known. Flu (first described in) is a nuclear-encoded, chloroplast-located protein that appears containing only protein-protein interaction sites. It is currently not known which other proteins interact through this linker. The regulatory protein is a transmembrane protein that is located in the thylakoid membrane. Later, it was discovered that Tigrina mutants in barley, known a long time ago, are also mutated in the same gene. It is not obvious why no mutants of any other gene were observed; maybe mutations in other proteins, involved into the regulatory chain, are fatal. Flu is a single gene, not a member of the gene family.

Later, by the sequence similarity, a similar protein was found in Chlamydomonas algae, showing that this regulatory subsystem existed a long time before the angiosperms lost the independent conversion enzyme. In a different manner, the Chlamydomonas regulatory protein is more complex: It is larger, crosses the thylakoid membrane twice rather than once, contains more protein-protein interactions sites, and even undergoes alternative splicing. It appears that the regulatory system underwent simplification during evolution.
