= Phytantriol =

Names
- IUPAC name 3,7,11,15-Tetramethylhexadecane-1,2,3-triol
- Other names C20-triol, tetramethyl trihydroxyhexadecane, 3,7,11,15,-tetramethyl-1,2,3,-trihydroxyhexadecane, curasan, haircare complex, CLR, AEC phytantriol, PTL, C20-triole, panteen, PTR

Identifiers
CAS Number	74563-64-7
3D model (JSmol)	Interactive image
Beilstein Reference	1866094
ChEBI	CHEBI:47770
ChemSpider	2286035
ECHA InfoCard	100.070.818
EC Number	277-923-2
PubChem CID	3018525
UNII	8LVI07A72W
CompTox Dashboard (EPA)	DTXSID10868315
- InChI: InChI=1S/C20H42O3/c1-16(2)9-6-10-17(3)11-7-12-18(4)13-8-14-20(5,23)19(22)15-21/h16-19,21-23H,6-15H2,1-5H3 Key: CGIHFIDULQUVJG-UHFFFAOYSA-N
- SMILES: CC(C)CCCC(C)CCCC(C)CCCC(C)(C(CO)O)O

Properties
Chemical formula	C_{20}H_{42}O_{3}
Molar mass	330.553 g·mol^{−1}
Appearance	Pale yellow or clear viscous liquid
Odor	sweetish
Density	0.905 g/ml
Melting point	5–10 °C (41–50 °F; 278–283 K)
Boiling point	145 °C (1.45 ×10^{−5} psi); 300 °C (14.69 psi)
Solubility in water	Soluble in water, ethanol, and propylene glycol

Hazards
- GHS labelling
Pictograms	(GHS07: Exclamation mark)
Signal word	Warning
Hazard statements	H315, H317, H413
Precautionary statements	P261, P264, P272, P273, P280, P302+P352, P321, P332+P313, P333+P313, P362, P363, P501
- Except where otherwise noted, data are given for materials in their standard state (at 25 °C [77 °F], 100 kPa). Infobox references

Phytantriol is an aliphatic alcohol used in cosmetic products and as a food additive. At room temperature it is a viscous liquid that is colourless to light yellow and with a sweetish odour.

== Preparation ==
Phytantriol is prepared by oxidizing isophytol in formic acid, hydrolysis of the product with an inorganic base, and isolation.

== Uses ==
As a cosmetic ingredient, phytantriol functions to increase moisture retention in skin and hair and helps vitamins and amino acids penetrate. As of 2002 it is found in about 100 cosmetic products, such as hair conditioners, shampoos, and hair tonics, in concentrations from 0.0002% to 1%.

Phytantriol is an amphiphile that is the second most used in making cubosomes.

== Toxicology ==
Oral LD_{50} values were >5000 mg/kg in rats and mice.

== See also ==
- Phytol
- Isophytol
