= Min Chen (biologist) =

Plant physiologist

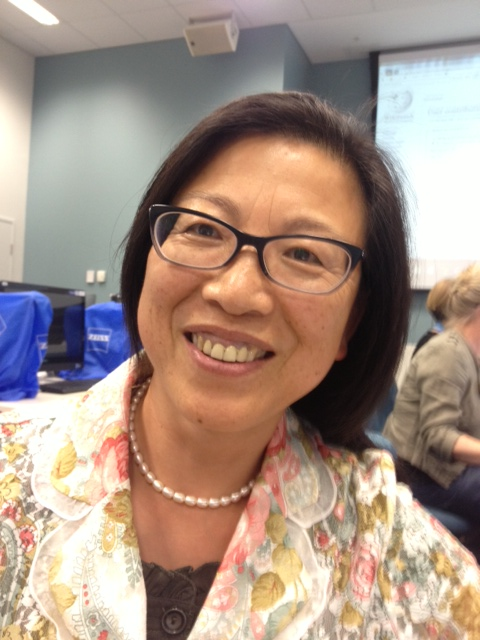
- Photo taken at Sydney University Wikibomb 2014
- Born: 1963 (age 61–62); China
- Education: Northeast Normal University (BSc, & MSc); University of Sydney (Ph.D.)
- Alma mater: University of Sydney
- Known for: chlorophyll f
- Scientific career
- Fields: Biology
- Institutions: University of Sydney
- Website: University of Sydney page

Min Chen is an Australian plant physiologist. She is a full professor and Australian Research Council Future Fellow in the School of Biological Sciences at the University of Sydney. Her research is primarily concerned with elucidating the molecular and biochemical mechanism of the energy-storing reactions in photosynthetic organisms, especially the function of novel photopigments in oxygenic photosynthetic bacteria.

== Early life and education ==
She was born in Dalian, China and educated in Northeast Normal University, China - BSc in 1984 and MSc in 1987 - and received her PhD in 2003 from University of Sydney.

== Research ==
Her research found that chlorophyll f has an absorption maximum at 706nm in vitro, which suggests that oxygenic photosynthesis can be extended even further into the infrared region, which may open up associated bioenergy applications. Red-shifted chlorophylls could be used extend light capture in crop plants. Chen is the University of Sydney node leader of Australian Research Council Centre of Excellence for Translational Photosynthesis. The function of Chlorophyll f in photosynthetic reactions is uncertain and the ecological distribution of chlorophyll f remains unknown.

== Awards ==
In October 2011, Chen was awarded the Science Minister’s Prize for Life Scientist of the Year, for her role in discovering a new form of chlorophyll, called chlorophyll f. In 2013 she was recipient of the Robin Hill Award of the International Society for Photosynthesis Research and in the same year awarded the Peter Goldacre Award by the Australian Society of Plant Scientists.
