= Isophytol =

Names
- IUPAC name 3,7,11,15-Tetramethylhexadec-1-en-3-ol

Identifiers
CAS Number	505-32-8
3D model (JSmol)	Interactive image
ChEMBL	ChEMBL453797
ChemSpider	10021
ECHA InfoCard	100.007.281
EC Number	208-008-8
PubChem CID	10453
UNII	A831ZI6VIM
CompTox Dashboard (EPA)	DTXSID2025474
- InChI: InChI=1S/C20H40O/c1-7-20(6,21)16-10-15-19(5)14-9-13-18(4)12-8-11-17(2)3/h7,17-19,21H,1,8-16H2,2-6H3
- SMILES: CC(C)CCCC(C)CCCC(C)CCCC(C)(C=C)O

Properties
Chemical formula	C_{20}H_{40}O
Molar mass	296.539 g·mol^{−1}
Appearance	Colorless viscous liquid
Density	0.8458 g/cm^{3} (20 °C)
Boiling point	334.88 °C (634.78 °F; 608.03 K)
Solubility in water	Poor
Solubility in other solvents	Very soluble in benzene, diethyl ether, and ethanol

Hazards
- GHS labelling
Pictograms	(GHS07: Exclamation mark) (GHS09: Environmental hazard)
Signal word	Warning
Hazard statements	H315, H410
Precautionary statements	P264, P273, P280, P302+P352, P321, P332+P313, P362, P391, P501
Flash point	135 °C (275 °F; 408 K) (closed cup)
- Except where otherwise noted, data are given for materials in their standard state (at 25 °C [77 °F], 100 kPa). Infobox references

Isophytol is a terpenoid alcohol that is used as a fragrance and as an intermediate in the production of vitamin E and K_{1}.

== Occurrence ==
Isophytol has been in found in two red algae species and more than 15 plant species. Concentrations found have been low.

== Synthesis ==
It can be synthesized in six steps from pseudoionone and propargyl alcohol. Total synthesis begins with the combination of acetylene and acetone to produce 3-methyl-1-butyn-3-ol. Hydrogenation by palladium catalysis results in 3-methyl-1-buten-3-ol. Reaction with diketene or acetic acid ester creates the acetoacetate; thermal reaction leads to 2-methyl-2-hepten-6-one. The steps of adding acetylene and then isopropenyl methyl ether and hydrogenating the product are done twice (this involves an intermediate of pseudoionone); then acetylene is added to create dehydroisophytol. Hydrogenation results in isophytol.

== Uses ==
Production industrially was estimated to be 35000 to 40000 tons in 2002, created by total synthesis, with about 99.9% used in synthesizing vitamin E and vitamin K_{1}. More than 95% of the less than 40 tons used annually in consumer products is as a fragrance. Less than 2 tons a year is used for flavoring.

In perfumes the concentration is 0.2% v/v at most.

== Toxicology ==
Oral LD_{50} values in mammals are greater than 5000 mg/kg.

== See also ==
- Phytol
- Phytantriol

== Bibliography ==
- OECD (21 February 2003). Isophytol SIDS Initial Assessment Report for SIAM 16 (PDF) (Report). UNEP. Archived from the original (PDF) on 28 March 2012.
