= Chlorophyll synthase =

Class of enzymes

chlorophyll synthase

Identifiers
- EC no.: 2.5.1.62

Databases
- IntEnz: IntEnz view
- BRENDA: BRENDA entry
- ExPASy: NiceZyme view
- KEGG: KEGG entry
- MetaCyc: metabolic pathway
- PRIAM: profile
- PDB structures: RCSB PDB PDBe PDBsum
- Gene Ontology: AmiGO / QuickGO
Search
- PMC: articles
- PubMed: articles
- NCBI: proteins

In enzymology, chlorophyll synthase (EC 2.5.1.62) is an enzyme that catalyzes the chemical reaction

chlorophyllide a + phytyl diphosphate $\rightleftharpoons$ chlorophyll a + diphosphate

The two substrates of this enzyme are chlorophyllide a and phytyl diphosphate; its two products are chlorophyll a and diphosphate. The same enzyme can act on chlorophyllide b to form chlorophyll b and similarly for chlorophyll d and f.

Structures of the main substrate and product of the enzyme

Chlorophyllide a

Chlorophyll a

This enzyme belongs to the family of transferases, specifically those transferring aryl or alkyl groups other than methyl groups. The systematic name of this enzyme class is chlorophyllide-a:phytyl-diphosphate phytyltransferase. This reaction is the final step of the complete biosynthetic pathway to chlorophylls from glutamic acid.

== See also ==
- Biosynthesis of chlorophylls
