= Chlorophyll d =

Identifiers
CAS Number	519-63-1
3D model (JSmol)	Interactive image
ChEBI	CHEBI:38199
ChemSpider	16736116
PubChem CID	6449882; 16070025
UNII	60L1FX1O1U
CompTox Dashboard (EPA)	DTXSID80894762
- InChI: InChI=1S/C54H71N4O6.Mg/c1-12-38-34(7)42-27-46-40(29-59)36(9)41(56-46)26-43-35(8)39(51(57-43)49-50(54(62)63-11)53(61)48-37(10)44(58-52(48)49)28-45(38)55-42)22-23-47(60)64-25-24-33(6)21-15-20-32(5)19-14-18-31(4)17-13-16-30(2)3;/h24,26-32,35,39,50H,12-23,25H2,1-11H3,(H-,55,56,57,58,59,61);/q-1;+2/p-1/b33-24+;/t31-,32-,35+,39+,50-;/m1./s1 Key: QXWRYZIMSXOOPY-SKHCYZARSA-M; InChI=1S/C54H71N4O6.Mg/c1-12-38-34(7)42-27-46-40(29-59)36(9)41(56-46)26-43-35(8)39(51(57-43)49-50(54(62)63-11)53(61)48-37(10)44(58-52(48)49)28-45(38)55-42)22-23-47(60)64-25-24-33(6)21-15-20-32(5)19-14-18-31(4)17-13-16-30(2)3;/h24,26-32,35,39,50H,12-23,25H2,1-11H3,(H-,55,56,57,58,59,61);/q-1;+2/p-1/b33-24+;/t31-,32-,35+,39+,50-;/m1./s1
- SMILES: CC(C)CCC[C@@H](C)CCC[C@@H](C)CCCC(\C)=C\COC(=O)CC[C@H]6[C@H](C)C=5/C=C/2\N\1[Mg]n4c(\C=C\3/N=C(/C=C/1C(\C=O)=C\2\C)C(/C)=C/3/CC)c(C)c7c4\C(=C6/N=5)[C@@H](C(=O)OC)C7=O

Properties
Chemical formula	C_{54}H_{70}MgO_{6}N_{4}
- Except where otherwise noted, data are given for materials in their standard state (at 25 °C [77 °F], 100 kPa). verify (what is ?) Infobox references

Chlorophyll d (Chl d) is a form of chlorophyll, identified by Harold Strain and Winston Manning in 1943. It was unambiguously identified in Acaryochloris marina in the 1990s. It is present in cyanobacteria which use energy captured from sunlight for photosynthesis. Chl d absorbs far-red light, at 710 nm wavelength, just outside the optical range. An organism that contains Chl d is adapted to an environment such as moderately deep water, where it can use far red light for photosynthesis, although there is not a lot of visible light.

Chl d is produced from chlorophyllide d by chlorophyll synthase. Chlorophyllide d is made from chlorophyllide a, but the oxygen-using enzyme that performs this conversion remains unknown as of 2022.

Ball-and-stick model	Space-filling model
