= Chlorophyll a =

- Structure of chlorophyll a

Names
- IUPAC name Chlorophyll a
- Systematic IUPAC name Magnesium [methyl (3S,4S,21R)-14-ethyl-4,8,13,18-tetramethyl-20-oxo-3-(3-oxo-3-{[(2E,7R,11R)-3,7,11,15-tetramethyl-2-hexadecen-1-yl]oxy}propyl)-9-vinyl-21-phorbinecarboxylatato(2−)-κ^{2}N,N′]
- Other names α-Chlorophyll

Identifiers
CAS Number	479-61-8
3D model (JSmol)	Interactive image; Interactive image
ChemSpider	16736115
ECHA InfoCard	100.006.852
EC Number	207-536-6
PubChem CID	6433192
RTECS number	FW6420000
UNII	YF5Q9EJC8Y
CompTox Dashboard (EPA)	DTXSID90889346
- InChI: InChI=1S/C55H73N4O5.Mg/c1-13-39-35(8)42-28-44-37(10)41(24-25-48(60)64-27-26-34(7)23-17-22-33(6)21-16-20-32(5)19-15-18-31(3)4)52(58-44)50-51(55(62)63-12)54(61)49-38(11)45(59-53(49)50)30-47-40(14-2)36(9)43(57-47)29-46(39)56-42;/h13,26,28-33,37,41,51H,1,14-25,27H2,2-12H3,(H-,56,57,58,59,61);/q-1;+2/p-1/b34-26+;/t32-,33-,37+,41+,51-;/m1./s1 Key: ATNHDLDRLWWWCB-AENOIHSZSA-M; InChI=1S/C55H73N4O5.Mg/c1-13-39-35(8)42-28-44-37(10)41(24-25-48(60)64-27-26-34(7)23-17-22-33(6)21-16-20-32(5)19-15-18-31(3)4)52(58-44)50-51(55(62)63-12)54(61)49-38(11)45(59-53(49)50)30-47-40(14-2)36(9)43(57-47)29-46(39)56-42;/h13,26,28-33,37,41,51H,1,14-25,27H2,2-12H3,(H-,56,57,58,59,61);/q-1;+2/p-1/b34-26+;/t32?,33?,37-,41-,51+;/m0./s1 Key: ATNHDLDRLWWWCB-WJQLOWBJSA-M
- SMILES: CCC1=C(C2=NC1=CC3=C(C4=C([N-]3)C(=C5[C@H]([C@@H](C(=N5)C=C6C(=C(C(=C2)[N-]6)C=C)C)C)CCC(=O)OC/C=C(\C)/CCCC(C)CCCC(C)CCCC(C)C)[C@H](C4=O)C(=O)OC)C)C.[Mg+2]; COC(=O)C9C(=O)c6c(C)c3N7c6c9c2C(CCC(=O)COCC=C(C)CCCC(C)CCCC(C)CCCC(C)C)C(C)c1cc5N8c(cc4n([Mg]78n12)c(c=3)c(CC)c4c)c(C=C)c5C

Properties
Chemical formula	C_{55}H_{72}MgN_{4}O_{5}
Molar mass	893.509 g·mol^{−1}
Appearance	Dark green powder
Odor	Odorless
Density	1.079 g/cm^{3}
Melting point	~ 152.3 °C (306.1 °F; 425.4 K) decomposes
Solubility in water	Insoluble
Solubility	Very soluble in ethanol, ether Soluble in ligroin, acetone, benzene, chloroform
Absorbance	See text
- Except where otherwise noted, data are given for materials in their standard state (at 25 °C [77 °F], 100 kPa). verify (what is ?) Infobox references

Chlorophyll a is a specific form of chlorophyll used in oxygenic photosynthesis. It absorbs most energy from wavelengths of violet-blue and orange-red light. It is a poor absorber of green and near-green portions of the spectrum, which makes chlorophyll-containing tissues appear green. This photosynthetic pigment is essential for photosynthesis in eukaryotes, cyanobacteria and prochlorophytes because of its role as primary electron donor in the electron transport chain. Chlorophyll a also transfers resonance energy in the antenna complex, ending in the reaction center where specific chlorophylls P680 and P700 are located.

== Distribution of chlorophyll a ==
Chlorophyll a is essential for most photosynthetic organisms to release chemical energy but is not the only pigment that can be used for photosynthesis. All oxygenic photosynthetic organisms use chlorophyll a, but differ in accessory pigments like chlorophyll b. Chlorophyll a can also be found in very small quantities in the green sulfur bacteria, an anaerobic photoautotroph. These organisms use bacteriochlorophyll and some chlorophyll a but do not produce oxygen. Anoxygenic photosynthesis is the term applied to this process, unlike oxygenic photosynthesis where oxygen is produced during the light reactions of photosynthesis.

== Molecular structure ==
The molecular structure of chlorophyll a consists of a chlorin ring, whose four nitrogen atoms surround a central magnesium atom, and has several other attached side chains and a hydrocarbon tail formed by a phytol ester.

Structure of chlorophyll a molecule showing the phytol tail

=== Chlorin ring ===
Chlorin, the central ring structure of the chlorophyll a

Chlorophyll a contains a magnesium ion encased in a large ring structure known as a chlorin. The chlorin ring is a heterocyclic compound derived from pyrrole. Four nitrogen atoms from the chlorin surround and bind the magnesium atom. The magnesium center uniquely defines the structure as a chlorophyll molecule. The porphyrin ring of bacteriochlorophyll is saturated, and lacking alternation of double and single bonds causing variation in absorption of light.

=== Side chains ===
The green boxed CH_{3} is the methyl group at the C-7 position chlorophyll a

Side chains are attached to the chlorin ring of the various chlorophyll molecules. Different side chains characterize each type of chlorophyll molecule, and alters the absorption spectrum of light. For instance, the only difference between chlorophyll a and chlorophyll b is that chlorophyll b has an aldehyde instead of a methyl group at the C-7 position.

=== Hydrocarbon tail ===
The phytol ester of chlorophyll a (R in the diagram) is a long hydrophobic tail which anchors the molecule to other hydrophobic proteins in the thylakoid membrane of the chloroplast. Once detached from the porphyrin ring, phytol becomes the precursor of two biomarkers, pristane and phytane, which are important in the study of geochemistry and the determination of petroleum sources.

== Biosynthesis ==
The Chlorophyll a biosynthetic pathway utilizes a variety of enzymes. In most plants, chlorophyll is derived from glutamate and is synthesised along a branched pathway that is shared with heme and siroheme. The initial steps incorporate glutamic acid into 5-aminolevulinic acid (ALA); two molecules of ALA are then reduced to porphobilinogen (PBG), and four molecules of PBG are coupled, forming protoporphyrin IX.

Chlorophyll synthase is the enzyme that completes the biosynthesis of chlorophyll a by catalysing the reaction EC 2.5.1.62

chlorophyllide a + phytyl diphosphate $\rightleftharpoons$ chlorophyll a + diphosphate

This forms an ester of the carboxylic acid group in chlorophyllide a with the 20-carbon diterpene alcohol phytol.

== Reactions of photosynthesis ==
=== Absorbance of light ===
==== Light spectrum ====
Absorption spectrum of chlorophyll a and chlorophyll b. The use of both together enhances the size of the absorption of light for producing energy.

Chlorophyll a absorbs light within the violet, blue and red wavelengths. Accessory photosynthetic pigments broaden the spectrum of light absorbed, increasing the range of wavelengths that can be used in photosynthesis. The addition of chlorophyll b next to chlorophyll a extends the absorption spectrum. In low light conditions, plants produce a greater ratio of chlorophyll b to chlorophyll a molecules, increasing photosynthetic yield.

==== Light gathering ====
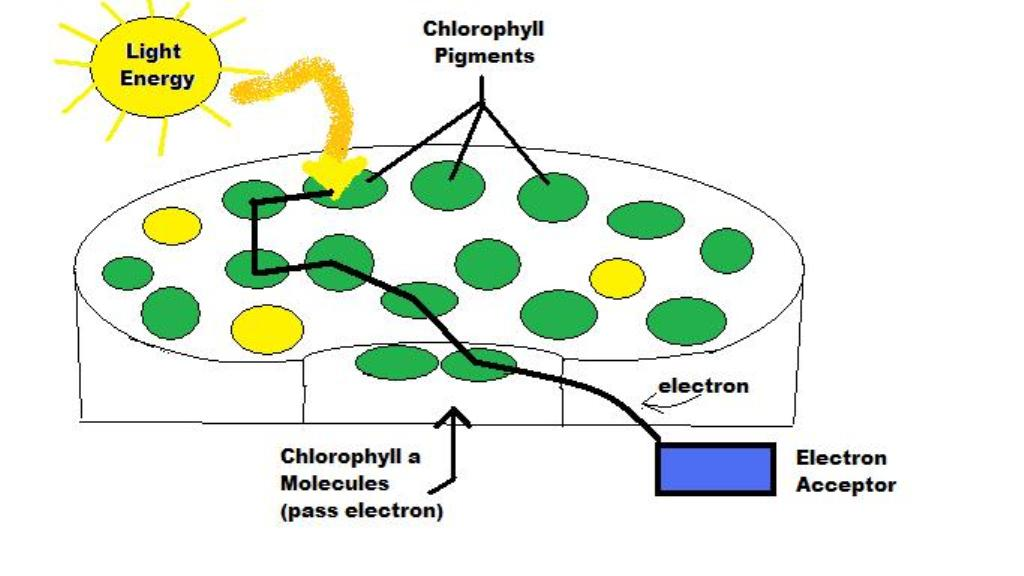
The antenna complex with energy transfer within the thylakoid membrane of a chloroplast. Chlorophyll a in the reaction center is the only pigment to pass boosted electrons to an acceptor (modified from 2).

Absorption of light by photosynthetic pigments converts photons into chemical energy. Light energy radiating onto the chloroplast strikes the pigments in the thylakoid membrane and excites their electrons. Since the chlorophyll a molecules only capture certain wavelengths, organisms may use accessory pigments to capture a wider range of light energy shown as the yellow circles. It then transfers captured light from one pigment to the next as resonance energy, passing energy one pigment to the other until reaching the special chlorophyll a molecules in the reaction center. These special chlorophyll a molecules are located in both photosystem II and photosystem I. They are known as P680 for Photosystem II and P700 for Photosystem I. P680 and P700 are the primary electron donors to the electron transport chain. These two systems are different in their redox potentials for one-electron oxidation. The E_{m} for P700 is approximately 500 mV, while the E_{m} for P680 is approximately 1,100-1,200 mV.

=== Primary electron donation ===
Chlorophyll a is very important in the energy phase of photosynthesis. Two electrons need to be passed to an electron acceptor for the process of photosynthesis to proceed. Within the reaction centers of both photosystems there are a pair of chlorophyll a molecules that pass electrons on to the transport chain through redox reactions.

== Ocean ==
The concentration of chlorophyll A is used as an index of phytoplankton biomass. In the ocean, phytoplankton all contain the chlorophyll pigment, which has a greenish color.

Phytoplankton are microscopic organisms that live in watery environments and changes in the amount of phytoplankton indicate the change in productivity of the ocean. Phytoplankton can be affected indirectly by climatic factors, such as changes in water temperatures and surface winds.

== See also ==
- Photosystem II light harvesting protein
- Chlorophyll b, another related chemical
- Chlorophyll c, an accessory pigment of chlorophyll
