= Chlorophyll f =

Names
- IUPAC name [methyl 14-ethyl-8-formyl-4,13,18-trimethyl-20-oxo-3-{3-oxo-3-[(3,7,11,15-tetramethylhexadec-2-en-1-yl)oxy]propyl}-9-vinylphorbine-21-carboxylatato(2−)-κ4N23,N24,N25,N26]magnesium

Identifiers
3D model (JSmol)	Interactive image; Interactive image
ChEBI	CHEBI:61290
PubChem CID	50909847
- InChI: InChI=1S/C55H71N4O6.Mg/c1-12-38-35(8)42-27-46-39(13-2)41(30-60)47(57-46)28-43-36(9)40(52(58-43)50-51(55(63)64-11)54(62)49-37(10)44(59-53(49)50)29-45(38)56-42)23-24-48(61)65-26-25-34(7)22-16-21-33(6)20-15-19-32(5)18-14-17-31(3)4;/h13,25,27-33,36,40,51H,2,12,14-24,26H2,1,3-11H3,(H-,56,57,58,59,60,62);/q-1;+2/p-1/b34-25+;/t32-,33-,36+,40+,51-;/m1./s1 Key: FBMIDEWOZNHQKD-VBYMZDBQSA-M
- SMILES: CCC1=C(C2=NC1=CC3=C(C4=C([N-]3)C(=C5[C@H]([C@@H](C(=N5)C=C6C(=C(C(=C2)[N-]6)C=C)C=O)C)CCC(=O)OC/C=C(\C)/CCC[C@H](C)CCC[C@H](C)CCCC(C)C)[C@H](C4=O)C(=O)OC)C)C.[Mg+2]; COC(=O)C9C(=O)c6c(C)c3n7c6c9c2C(CCC(=O)COCC=C(C)CCCC(C)CCCC(C)CCCC(C)C)C(C)c1cc5n8c(cc4n([Mg]78n12)c(c=3)c(CC)c4c)c(C=C)c5C=O

Properties
Chemical formula	C_{55}H_{70}O_{6}N_{4}Mg
Molar mass	907.4725 g/mol
- Except where otherwise noted, data are given for materials in their standard state (at 25 °C [77 °F], 100 kPa). Infobox references

Chlorophyll f (Chl f) is a form of chlorophyll that absorbs further into the red (near-infrared light) spectrum than other chlorophylls. In 2010, it was reported by Min Chen to be present in stromatolites from Western Australia's Shark Bay. It has been found in cyanobacteria inside deep caves which appear perfectly dark in the visible light spectrum, but are lit up in near-infrared light which reflects more effectively from the rocks, allowing the cyanobacteria to photosynthesize using light with a wavelength as long as 780nm.

The function of Chl f in photosynthetic reactions in plants and the wider ecological distribution of Chl f remains little studied. Chl f has been shown to support some of the roles in photosynthetic reactions, in both the energy transfer and in the charge separation processes.

Chl f is produced from chlorophyllide f by chlorophyll synthase. Chlorophyllide f is made from chlorophyllide a by an enzyme known as PsbA4 or ChlF.
