= Chlorophyll b =

- Structure of β-Chlorophyll

Names
- IUPAC name Chlorophyll b
- Systematic IUPAC name Magnesium [methyl (3S,4S,21R)-14-ethyl-13-formyl-4,8,18-trimethyl-20-oxo-3-(3-oxo-3-{[(2E,7R,11R)-3,7,11,15-tetramethyl-2-hexadecen-1-yl]oxy}propyl)-9-vinyl-21-phorbinecarboxylatato(2-)-κ^{2}N,N′]
- Other names β-Chlorophyll

Identifiers
CAS Number	519-62-0
3D model (JSmol)	Interactive image
ChemSpider	16739843
ECHA InfoCard	100.007.522
EC Number	208-272-4
E number	E140 (colours)
PubChem CID	6450186; 11593175 (from spinach)
UNII	5712ZB110R
CompTox Dashboard (EPA)	DTXSID70889349
- InChI: InChI=1S/C55H71N4O6.Mg/c1-12-38-35(8)42-27-43-36(9)40(23-24-48(61)65-26-25-34(7)22-16-21-33(6)20-15-19-32(5)18-14-17-31(3)4)52(58-43)50-51(55(63)64-11)54(62)49-37(10)44(59-53(49)50)28-46-39(13-2)41(30-60)47(57-46)29-45(38)56-42;/h12,25,27-33,36,40,51H,1,13-24,26H2,2-11H3,(H-,56,57,58,59,60,62);/q-1;+2/p-1/b34-25+;/t32-,33-,36+,40+,51-;/m1./s1 Key: NSMUHPMZFPKNMZ-VBYMZDBQSA-M; InChI=1S/C55H72N4O6.Mg/c1-12-38-35(8)42-27-43-36(9)40(23-24-48(61)65-26-25-34(7)22-16-21-33(6)20-15-19-32(5)18-14-17-31(3)4)52(58-43)50-51(55(63)64-11)54(62)49-37(10)44(59-53(49)50)28-46-39(13-2)41(30-60)47(57-46)29-45(38)56-42;/h12,25,27-33,36,40,51H,1,13-24,26H2,2-11H3,(H2,56,57,58,59,60,62);/q;+2/p-2/b34-25+;/t32-,33-,36+,40+,51-;/m1./s1 Key: MSLKMRUEVOYOOZ-VBYMZDBQSA-L
- SMILES: CCC1=C(C2=NC1=CC3=C(C4=C([N-]3)C(=C5[C@H]([C@@H](C(=N5)C=C6C(=C(C(=C2)[N-]6)C=C)C)C)CCC(=O)OC/C=C(\C)/CCC[C@H](C)CCC[C@H](C)CCCC(C)C)[C@H](C4=O)C(=O)OC)C)C=O.[Mg+2]

Properties
Chemical formula	C_{55}H_{70}MgN_{4}O_{6}
Molar mass	907.492 g·mol^{−1}
Appearance	Green
Odor	Odorless
Melting point	~ 125 °C (257 °F; 398 K)
Solubility in water	Insoluble
Solubility	Very soluble in ethanol, ether, pyridine Soluble in methanol
Absorbance	See text
- Except where otherwise noted, data are given for materials in their standard state (at 25 °C [77 °F], 100 kPa). verify (what is ?) Infobox references

The absorption spectrum of both the chlorophyll a and the chlorophyll b pigments. The use of both together enhances the size of the absorption of light for producing energy.

Chlorophyll b is a form of chlorophyll. Chlorophyll b helps in photosynthesis by absorbing light energy. It is more soluble than chlorophyll a in polar solvents because of its extra carbonyl group. Its color is green, and it primarily absorbs blue light.

In land plants, the light-harvesting antennae around photosystem II contain the majority of chlorophyll b. Hence, in shade-adapted chloroplasts, which have an increased ratio of photosystem II to photosystem I, there is a higher ratio of chlorophyll b to chlorophyll a. This is adaptive, as increasing chlorophyll b increases the range of wavelengths absorbed by the shade chloroplasts.

Structure of chlorophyll b molecule showing the long hydrocarbon tail

== Biosynthesis ==
The Chlorophyll b biosynthetic pathway utilizes a variety of enzymes. In most plants, chlorophyll is derived from glutamate and is synthesised along a branched pathway that is shared with heme and siroheme. The initial steps incorporate glutamic acid into 5-aminolevulinic acid (ALA); two molecules of ALA are then reduced to porphobilinogen (PBG), and four molecules of PBG are coupled, forming protoporphyrin IX.

Chlorophyll synthase is the enzyme that completes the biosynthesis of chlorophyll b by catalysing the reaction EC 2.5.1.62

chlorophyllide b + phytyl diphosphate $\rightleftharpoons$ chlorophyll b + diphosphate

This forms an ester of the carboxylic acid group in chlorophyllide b with the 20-carbon diterpene alcohol phytol.
