= Phytol =

- Phytol

Names
- IUPAC name (5R,9R)-5,6,7,8,9,10,11,12-Octahydro-1,6-secoretinol
- Systematic IUPAC name (2E,7R,11R)-3,7,11,15-Tetramethylhexadec-2-en-1-ol

Identifiers
CAS Number	150-86-7
3D model (JSmol)	Interactive image
ChEBI	CHEBI:17327
ChEMBL	ChEMBL3039479
ChemSpider	4444094
ECHA InfoCard	100.131.435
PubChem CID	5280435
UNII	5BC2RZ81NG
CompTox Dashboard (EPA)	DTXSID1040586
- InChI: InChI=1S/C20H40O/c1-17(2)9-6-10-18(3)11-7-12-19(4)13-8-14-20(5)15-16-21/h15,17-19,21H,6-14,16H2,1-5H3/b20-15+/t18-,19-/m1/s1 Key: BOTWFXYSPFMFNR-PYDDKJGSSA-N; InChI=1/C20H40O/c1-17(2)9-6-10-18(3)11-7-12-19(4)13-8-14-20(5)15-16-21/h15,17-19,21H,6-14,16H2,1-5H3/b20-15+/t18-,19-/m1/s1 Key: BOTWFXYSPFMFNR-PYDDKJGSBV
- SMILES: C[C@@H](CCC[C@@H](C)CCC/C(=C/CO)/C)CCCC(C)C

Properties
Chemical formula	C_{20}H_{40}O
Molar mass	296.539 g·mol^{−1}
Density	0.850 g cm^{−3}
Boiling point	203 to 204 °C (397 to 399 °F; 476 to 477 K) at 10 mmHg
- Except where otherwise noted, data are given for materials in their standard state (at 25 °C [77 °F], 100 kPa). verify (what is ?) Infobox references

Phytol (florasol, phytosol) is an acyclic hydrogenated diterpene alcohol. It is naturally found in many plants as a result of chlorophyll degradation and is used by them to produce vitamin E and vitamin K1. It smells grassy and dominates the aroma of certain green teas.

In human industry, phytol can be used to chemically synthesize vitamins E and K1. It is also used as a fragrance and flavoring in cosmetics, shampoos, toilet soaps, and detergents, as well as in some cannabis distillates as a diluent or for flavoring.

Its worldwide use has been estimated to be approximately 0.1–1.0 metric tons per year.

== Roles in nature ==
=== Plants ===
Phytol is mainly produced by plants from chlorophyll degradation. In the biosynthesis of chlorophyll in the mouse-ear cress chloroplast, the chlorophyll synthase attaches a chlorophyllide ring to geranylgeranyl pyrophosphate (GGPP). Two steps of reduction then convert the GG tail into a phytyl tail. When this phytyl tail is hydrolyzed off, it becomes phytol. Older theories of chlorophyll synthesis instead holds that the chlorophyll synthase directly acts on a chlorophyllide and a phytyl pyrophosphate (phytyl-PP), with the phytyl-PP directly produced by reduction of GGPP. Although this can happen using isolated enzymes in vitro, there is little evidence for this happening in vivo.

Phytol, or more precisely phytyl-PP, is used to build vitamin E (tocotrienol, tocopherol) and vitamin K1 (the reduced form, phylloquinol) in the chloroplast. The former protects the plant against oxidative stress and the latter acts as an essential part of the Photosystem I electron transport chain, without which photosynthesis cannot occur.

=== Invertebrates ===
Insects, such as the sumac flea beetle, are reported to use phytol and its metabolites (e.g. phytanic acid) as chemical deterrents against predation. These compounds originate from host plants.

=== Vertebrates ===
In shark liver it is converted to pristane.

==== Mammals ====
In ruminants, the gut fermentation of ingested plant materials liberates phytol, a constituent of chlorophyll, which is then converted to phytanic acid and stored in fats.

Indirect evidence has been provided that, in contrast to humans, diverse non-human primates can derive significant amounts of phytol from the hindgut fermentation of plant materials.

===== Modulator of transcription =====
Phytol and/or its metabolites have been reported to bind to and/or activate the transcription factors PPAR-alpha and retinoid X receptor (RXR). The metabolites phytanic acid and pristanic acid are naturally occurring ligands. In mice, oral phytol induces massive proliferation of peroxisomes in several organs.

== Possible biomedical applications ==
Phytol has been investigated for its potential anxiolytic, metabolism-modulating, cytotoxic, antioxidant, autophagy- and apoptosis-inducing, antinociceptive, anti-inflammatory, immune-modulating, and antimicrobial effects.

== Toxicology ==
=== Oral: refsum disease ===
Free phytol is converted by humans into phytanic acid, a natural compound also found in ruminant meat. Phytanic acid is dangerous for people with the autosomal recessive disorder Refsum disease (also known as adult Refsum disease), in which genetic changes renders them unable to break down this fatty acid and frequently manifests as a variable combination of peripheral polyneuropathy, cerebellar ataxia, retinitis pigmentosa, anosmia, and hearing loss. As a result, those suffering from this illness should avoid both free phytol and phytanic acid. They do not need to avoid chlorophyll as the human digestive system cannot effectively cleave off the phytol sidechain of chlorophyll.

A list of free phytol content in various convenience store foods is available.

=== Inhalation ===
In 2021, phytol was found to cause pulmonary hemorrhage and necrosis of nose, throat and lung tissue when exposed in aerosol to Sprague Dawley rats, with no safe dose range being established. A majority of the phytol rats turned out dead or moribund, leading to 2nd-day termination of the 14-day study.

==== Vape controversy ====
In 2020, Tokyo Smoke, a Canadian cannabis company owned by Canopy Growth at the time; pulled every phytol-containing product from their shelves and issued a 48 hour deadline to suppliers, demanding 'written confirmation' if it was included. A year later, David Heldreth, a former CSO of True Terpenes, a company that still listed it as a product; along with Andrew Freedman, investigated the matter, filing a request under the Access to Information Act to unredact the Health Canada study causing the product removals. In the same year, the Canadian government published an amendment to Canadian cannabis regulations regarding "flavours in cannabis extracts".

== Geochemical biomarker ==
Phytol has been described as "perhaps the most studied biomarker of those found in modern aquatic environments" in the context of biogeochemical tracers in aquatic environments. It is likely the most abundant acyclic isoprenoid compound present in the biosphere, being the ester sidechain of chlorophyll-a,b,c and bacteriochlorophyll-a (altogether produced by plants, algae, and many photosynthetic bacteria). It is degraded into a wide variety of products, including phytone, phytyldiol, dihydrophytol, pristane and many others, by biological and geological means. Some of these products such as pristane can be produced by other processes (such as oil spills) and are unusuable as a marker related to photosynthesis, while others such as dihydrophytol appear quite selective.

An example of this use of phytol is in the estimation of carbon isotopic fractionation during photosynthesis by Rubisco using ancient sediments.

== See also ==
- Archaeol
- Isophytol
- Phytantriol
