= Chlorophyll =

Green pigments found in plants, algae and bacteria

Chlorophyll at various scales

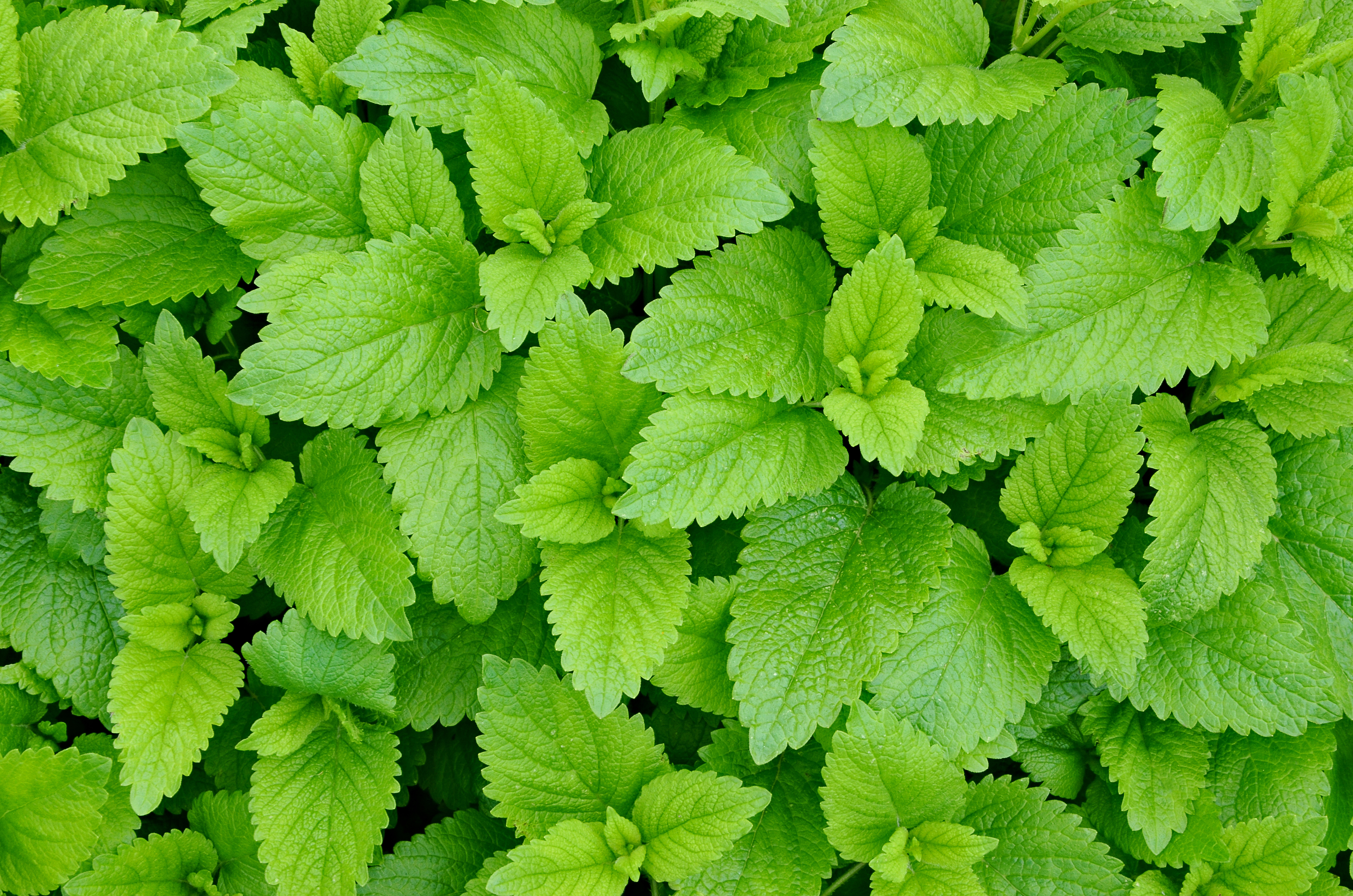
Chlorophyll is responsible for the green color of many plants and algae.

In plant and algal cells, chlorophyll is concentrated in structures called chloroplasts, as shown in this micrograph of cells in a moss leaf.

Plants are perceived as green because chlorophyll absorbs mainly the blue and red wavelengths but green light, reflected by plant structures like cell walls, is less absorbed.

There are several types of chlorophyll, but all share the chlorin magnesium ligand which forms the right side of this diagram.

Chlorophyll is any of several related photochemical catalysts and green pigments found in cyanobacteria and in the chloroplasts of algae and plants. Its name is derived from the Greek words χλωρός (khloros, "pale green") and φύλλον (phyllon, "leaf"). Chlorophyll allows plants to absorb energy from light. Those pigments are involved in oxygenic photosynthesis, as opposed to bacteriochlorophylls, which are related molecules found only in bacteria and involved in anoxygenic photosynthesis.

Chlorophylls absorb light most strongly in the blue and red portions of the electromagnetic spectrum. Conversely, it is a poor absorber of green and near-green portions of the spectrum. Hence chlorophyll-containing tissues appear green because green light, diffusively reflected by structures like cell walls, is less absorbed. Two types of chlorophyll exist in the photosystems of green plants: chlorophyll a and b.

== History ==
Chlorophyll was first isolated and named by Joseph Bienaimé Caventou and Pierre Joseph Pelletier in 1817. The presence of magnesium in chlorophyll was discovered in 1906, and was the first detection of that element in living tissue.

After initial work done by German chemist Richard Willstätter spanning from 1905 to 1915, the general structure of chlorophyll a was elucidated by Hans Fischer in 1940. By 1960, when most of the stereochemistry of chlorophyll a was known, Robert Burns Woodward published a total synthesis of the molecule. In 1967, the last remaining stereochemical elucidation was completed by Ian Fleming, and in 1990 Woodward and co-authors published an updated synthesis. Chlorophyll f was announced to be present in cyanobacteria and other oxygenic microorganisms that form stromatolites in 2010; a molecular formula of C_{55}H_{70}O_{6}N_{4}Mg and a structure of (2-formyl)-chlorophyll a were deduced based on NMR, optical and mass spectra.

== Photosynthesis ==
Absorbance spectra of free chlorophyll a (blue) and b (red) in a solvent. The spectra of chlorophyll molecules are slightly modified in vivo depending on specific pigment-protein interactions. Chlorophyll a Chlorophyll b

Chlorophyll is vital for photosynthesis, which allows plants to absorb energy from light.

Chlorophyll molecules are arranged in and around photosystems that are embedded in the thylakoid membranes of chloroplasts. In these complexes, chlorophyll serves three functions:

1. The function of the vast majority of chlorophyll (up to several hundred molecules per photosystem) is to absorb light.
2. Having done so, these same centers execute their second function: The transfer of that energy by resonance energy transfer to a specific chlorophyll pair in the reaction center of the photosystems.
3. This specific pair performs the final function of chlorophylls: Charge separation, which produces the unbound protons (H^{+}) and electrons (e^{−}) that separately propel biosynthesis.

The two currently accepted photosystem units are photosystem I and photosystem II, which have their own distinct reaction centres, named P700 and P680, respectively. These centres are named after the wavelength (in nanometers) of their red-peak absorption maximum. The identity, function and spectral properties of the types of chlorophyll in each photosystem are distinct and determined by each other and the protein structure surrounding them.

The function of the reaction center of chlorophyll is to absorb light energy and transfer it to other parts of the photosystem. The absorbed energy of the photon is transferred to an electron in a process called charge separation. The removal of the electron from the chlorophyll is an oxidation reaction. The chlorophyll donates the high energy electron to a series of molecular intermediates called an electron transport chain. The charged reaction center of chlorophyll (P680^{+}) is then reduced back to its ground state by accepting an electron stripped from water. The electron that reduces P680^{+} ultimately comes from the oxidation of water into O_{2} and H^{+} through several intermediates. This reaction is how photosynthetic organisms such as plants produce O_{2} gas, and is the source for practically all the O_{2} in Earth's atmosphere. Photosystem I typically works in series with Photosystem II; thus the P700^{+} of Photosystem I is usually reduced as it accepts the electron, via many intermediates in the thylakoid membrane, by electrons coming, ultimately, from Photosystem II. Electron transfer reactions in the thylakoid membranes are complex, however, and the source of electrons used to reduce P700^{+} can vary.

The electron flow produced by the reaction center chlorophyll pigments is used to pump H^{+} ions across the thylakoid membrane, setting up a proton-motive force a chemiosmotic potential used mainly in the production of ATP (stored chemical energy) or to reduce NADP^{+} to NADPH. NADPH is a universal agent used to reduce CO_{2} into sugars as well as other biosynthetic reactions.

Reaction center chlorophyll–protein complexes are capable of directly absorbing light and performing charge separation events without the assistance of other chlorophyll pigments, but the probability of a single chlorophyll molecule doing so under a given light intensity is small. Thus, the other chlorophylls in the photosystem and antenna pigment proteins all cooperatively absorb and funnel light energy to the reaction center. Besides chlorophyll a, there are other pigments, called accessory pigments, which occur in these pigment–protein antenna complexes. These pigments complement chlorophyll by absorbing photons at wavelengths outside of chlorophyll's narrow absorption spectrum and deliver additional electrons to the photosystem. The evolution of the enzymes producing cholorophyll is thought to have taken place 2.3 billion years ago.

== Chemical structure ==
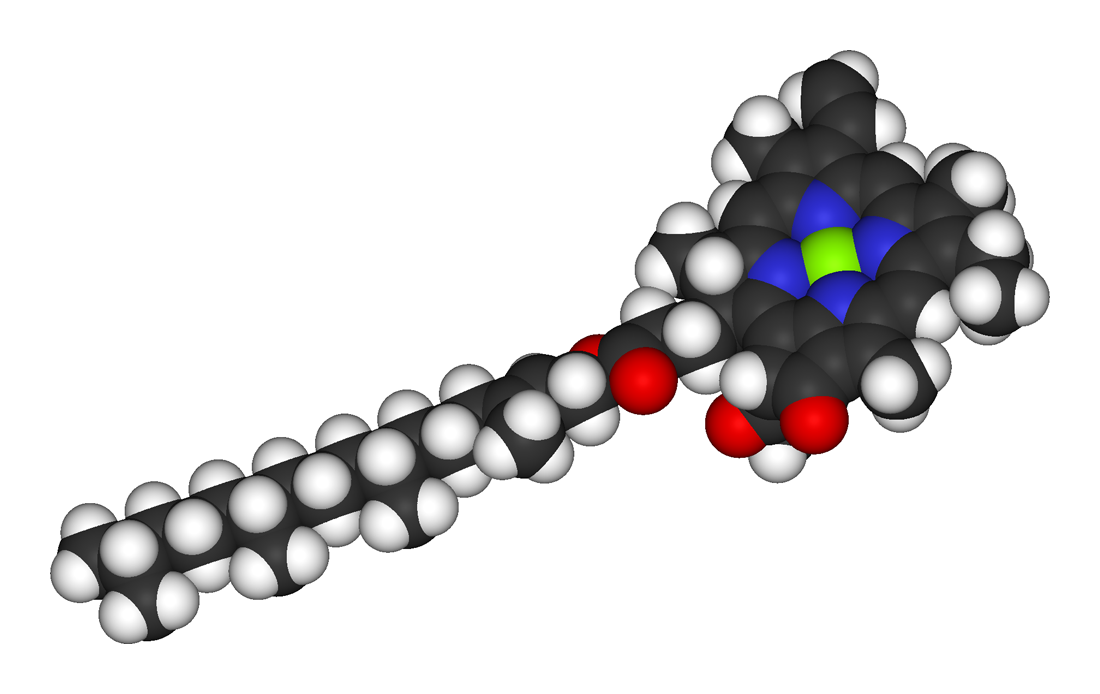
Space-filling model of the chlorophyll a molecule

Several chlorophylls are known. All are defined as derivatives of the parent chlorin by the presence of a fifth, ketone-containing ring beyond the four pyrrole-like rings. Most chlorophylls are classified as chlorins, which are reduced relatives of porphyrins (found in hemoglobin). They share a common biosynthetic pathway with porphyrins, including the precursor uroporphyrinogen III. Unlike hemes, which contain iron bound to the N4 center, most chlorophylls bind magnesium. The axial ligands attached to the Mg^{2+} center are often omitted for clarity. Appended to the chlorin ring are various side chains, usually including a long phytyl chain (C_{20}H_{39}O). The most widely distributed form in terrestrial plants is chlorophyll a. Chlorophyll a has methyl group in place of a formyl group in chlorophyll b. This difference affects the absorption spectrum, allowing plants to absorb a greater portion of visible light.

The structures of chlorophylls are summarized below:

| | Chlorophyll a | Chlorophyll b | Chlorophyll c_{1} | Chlorophyll c_{2} | Chlorophyll c_{3} | Chlorophyll d | Chlorophyll f |
| Molecular formula | C_{55}H_{72}MgN_{4}O_{5} | C_{55}H_{70}MgN_{4}O_{6} | C_{35}H_{30}MgN_{4}O_{5} | C_{35}H_{28}MgN_{4}O_{5} | C_{36}H_{28}MgN_{4}O_{7} | C_{54}H_{70}MgN_{4}O_{6} | C_{55}H_{70}MgN_{4}O_{6} |
| C2 group | −CH_{3} | −CH_{3} | −CH_{3} | −CH_{3} | −CH_{3} | −CH_{3} | −CHO |
| C3 group | −CH=CH_{2} | −CH=CH_{2} | −CH=CH_{2} | −CH=CH_{2} | −CH=CH_{2} | −CHO | −CH=CH_{2} |
| C7 group | −CH_{3} | −CHO | −CH_{3} | −CH_{3} | −COOCH_{3} | −CH_{3} | −CH_{3} |
| C8 group | −CH_{2}CH_{3} | −CH_{2}CH_{3} | −CH_{2}CH_{3} | −CH=CH_{2} | −CH=CH_{2} | −CH_{2}CH_{3} | −CH_{2}CH_{3} |
| C17 group | −CH_{2}CH_{2}COO−Phytyl | −CH_{2}CH_{2}COO−Phytyl | −CH=CHCOOH | −CH=CHCOOH | −CH=CHCOOH | −CH_{2}CH_{2}COO−Phytyl | −CH_{2}CH_{2}COO−Phytyl |
| C17−C18 bond | Single (chlorin) | Single (chlorin) | Double (porphyrin) | Double (porphyrin) | Double (porphyrin) | Single (chlorin) | Single (chlorin) |
| Occurrence | Universal | Mostly plants | Various algae | Various algae | Emiliania huxleyi | Cyanobacteria | Cyanobacteria |

Structures of chlorophylls

chlorophyll a

chlorophyll b

chlorophyll c_{1}

chlorophyll c_{2}

chlorophyll c_{3}

chlorophyll d

chlorophyll f

Chlorophyll e is reserved for a pigment that has been extracted from algae in 1966 but not chemically described. Besides the lettered chlorophylls, a wide variety of sidechain modifications to the chlorophyll structures are known in the wild. For example, Prochlorococcus, a cyanobacterium, uses 8-vinyl Chl a and b.

== Measurement of chlorophyll content ==
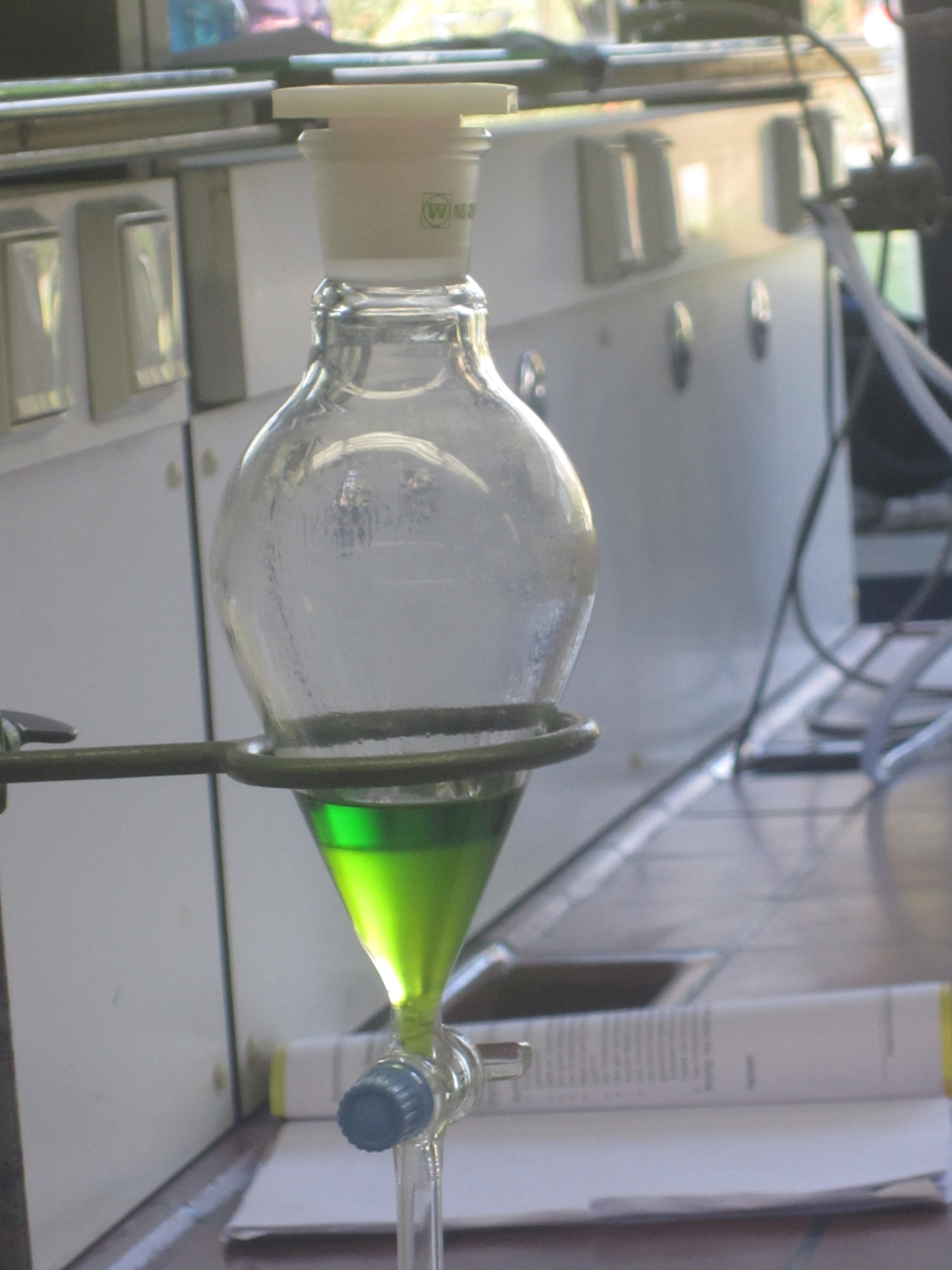
Chlorophyll forms deep green solutions in organic solvents.

Chlorophylls can be extracted from the protein into organic solvents. In this way, the concentration of chlorophyll within a leaf can be estimated. Methods also exist to separate chlorophyll a and chlorophyll b.

In diethyl ether, chlorophyll a has approximate absorbance maxima of 430 nm and 662 nm, while chlorophyll b has approximate maxima of 453 nm and 642 nm. The absorption peaks of chlorophyll a are at 465 nm and 665 nm. Chlorophyll a fluoresces at 673 nm (maximum) and 726 nm. The peak molar absorption coefficient of chlorophyll a exceeds 10^{5} M^{−1} cm^{−1}, which is among the highest for small-molecule organic compounds. In 90% acetone-water, the peak absorption wavelengths of chlorophyll a are 430 nm and 664 nm; peaks for chlorophyll b are 460 nm and 647 nm; peaks for chlorophyll c_{1} are 442 nm and 630 nm; peaks for chlorophyll c_{2} are 444 nm and 630 nm; peaks for chlorophyll d are 401 nm, 455 nm and 696 nm.

Ratio fluorescence emission can be used to measure chlorophyll content. By exciting chlorophyll a fluorescence at a lower wavelength, the ratio of chlorophyll fluorescence emission at 705±10 nm and 735±10 nm can provide a linear relationship of chlorophyll content when compared with chemical testing. The ratio F_{735}/F_{700} provided a correlation value of r^{2} 0.96 compared with chemical testing in the range from 41 mg m^{−2} up to 675 mg m^{−2}. Gitelson also developed a formula for direct readout of chlorophyll content in mg m^{−2}. The formula provided a reliable method of measuring chlorophyll content from 41 mg m^{−2} up to 675 mg m^{−2} with a correlation r^{2} value of 0.95.

Also, the chlorophyll concentration can be estimated by measuring the light transmittance through the plant leaves. The assessment of leaf chlorophyll content using optical sensors such as Dualex and SPAD allows researchers to perform real-time and non-destructive measurements. Research shows that these methods have a positive correlation with laboratory measurements of chlorophyll.

== Biosynthesis ==
In some plants, chlorophyll is derived from glutamate and is synthesised along a branched biosynthetic pathway that is shared with heme and siroheme. Chlorophyll synthase is the enzyme that completes the biosynthesis of chlorophyll a:

chlorophyllide a + phytyl diphosphate $\rightleftharpoons$ chlorophyll a + diphosphate

This conversion forms an ester of the carboxylic acid group in chlorophyllide a with the 20-carbon diterpene alcohol phytol. Chlorophyll b is made by the same enzyme acting on chlorophyllide b. The same is known for chlorophyll d and f, both made from corresponding chlorophyllides ultimately made from chlorophyllide a.

In Angiosperm plants, the later steps in the biosynthetic pathway are light-dependent. Such plants are pale (etiolated) if grown in darkness. Non-vascular plants and green algae have an additional light-independent enzyme and grow green even in darkness.

Chlorophyll is bound to proteins. Protochlorophyllide, one of the biosynthetic intermediates, occurs mostly in the free form and, under light conditions, acts as a photosensitizer, forming free radicals, which can be toxic to the plant. Hence, plants regulate the amount of this chlorophyll precursor. In angiosperms, this regulation is achieved at the step of aminolevulinic acid (ALA), one of the intermediate compounds in the biosynthesis pathway. Plants that are fed by ALA accumulate high and toxic levels of protochlorophyllide; so do the mutants with a damaged regulatory system.

== Senescence and the chlorophyll cycle ==
The process of plant senescence involves the degradation of chlorophyll: for example the enzyme chlorophyllase (EC 3.1.1.14) hydrolyses the phytyl sidechain to reverse the reaction in which chlorophylls are biosynthesised from chlorophyllide a or b. Since chlorophyllide a can be converted to chlorophyllide b and the latter can be re-esterified to chlorophyll b, these processes allow cycling between chlorophylls a and b. Moreover, chlorophyll b can be directly reduced (via 7^{1}-hydroxychlorophyll a) back to chlorophyll a, completing the cycle. In later stages of senescence, chlorophyllides are converted to a group of colourless tetrapyrroles known as nonfluorescent chlorophyll catabolites (NCC's) with the general structure:

These compounds have also been identified in ripening fruits.

== Distribution ==
Chlorophyll maps from 2002 to 2024, provided by NASA, show milligrams of chlorophyll per cubic meter of seawater each month. Places where chlorophyll amounts are very low, indicating very low numbers of phytoplankton, are blue. Places where chlorophyll concentrations are high, meaning many phytoplankton were growing, are yellow. The observations come from the Moderate Resolution Imaging Spectroradiometer (MODIS) on NASA's Aqua satellite. Land is dark gray, and places where MODIS could not collect data because of sea ice, polar darkness, or clouds are light gray. The highest chlorophyll concentrations, where tiny surface-dwelling ocean plants are, are in cold polar waters or in places where ocean currents bring cold water to the surface, such as around the equator and along the shores of continents. It is not the cold water itself that stimulates the phytoplankton. Instead, the cool temperatures are often a sign that the water has welled up to the surface from deeper in the ocean, carrying nutrients that have built up over time. In polar waters, nutrients accumulate in surface waters during the dark winter months when plants cannot grow. When sunlight returns in the spring and summer, the plants flourish in high concentrations.

== Uses ==
=== Culinary ===
Chlorophyll is registered as a food additive colorant either in the form of magnesium chlorophyll, as E number is E140i, or a copper complex of chlorophyll, as E number 141i. It is approved for this use in the EU, UK and the US. Chefs use chlorophyll to color a variety of foods and beverages green, such as pasta and spirits. Absinthe gains its green color naturally from the chlorophyll introduced through the large variety of herbs used in its production. Chlorophyll is not soluble in water, and it is first mixed with a small quantity of vegetable oil to obtain the desired solution.

=== In marketing ===
In years 1950–1953 in particular, chlorophyll was used as a marketing tool to promote toothpaste, sanitary towels, soap and other products. This was based on claims that it was an odor blocker — a finding from research by F. Howard Westcott in the 1940s — and the commercial value of this attribute in advertising led to many companies creating brands containing the compound. However, it was soon determined that the hype surrounding chlorophyll was not warranted and the underlying research may even have been a hoax. As a result, brands rapidly discontinued its use. In the 2020s, chlorophyll again became the subject of unsubstantiated medical claims, as social media influencers promoted its use in the form of "chlorophyll water", for example.

== See also ==
- Bacteriochlorophyll, related compounds in phototrophic bacteria
- Carotenoids, related photosensitive compounds that complement and protect chlorophyll
- Chlorophyllin, a semi-synthetic derivative of chlorophyll
- Deep chlorophyll maximum
- Chlorophyll fluorescence, to measure plant stress
- Purple Earth hypothesis, a scientific hypothesis that explains the evolution of red-blue spectral affinity of chlorophyll.
