= Chlortoluron =

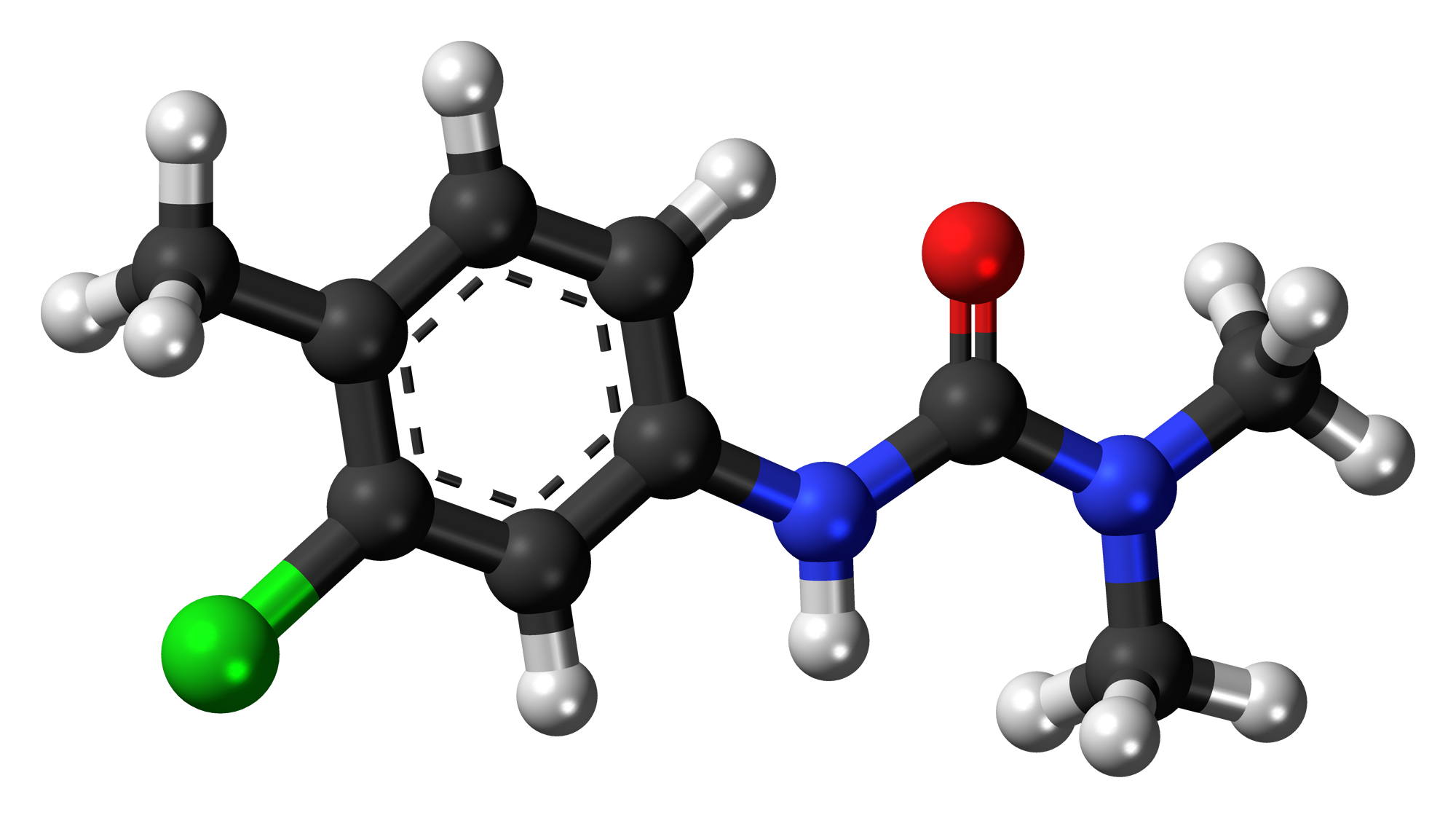

Names
- Preferred IUPAC name N′-(3-Chloro-4-methylphenyl)-N,N-dimethylurea
- Other names CTU, chlorotoluron, 3-(3-Chloro-4-methylphenyl)-1,1-dimethylurea

Identifiers
CAS Number	15545-48-9
3D model (JSmol)	Interactive image
ChEBI	CHEBI:81981
ChemSpider	25472
ECHA InfoCard	100.035.978
EC Number	239-592-2
PubChem CID	27375
UNII	SUW8L8G38A
CompTox Dashboard (EPA)	DTXSID8052853
- InChI: InChI=1S/C10H13ClN2O/c1-7-4-5-8(6-9(7)11)12-10(14)13(2)3/h4-6H,1-3H3,(H,12,14) Key: JXCGFZXSOMJFOA-UHFFFAOYSA-N
- SMILES: Clc1cc(NC(=O)N(C)C)ccc1C

Properties
Chemical formula	C_{10}H_{13}ClN_{2}O
Molar mass	212.67602
Melting point	148 °C (298 °F; 421 K)
log P	2.41

Hazards
- GHS labelling
Pictograms	(GHS08: Health hazard) (GHS09: Environmental hazard)
Signal word	Warning
Hazard statements	H351, H361d, H410
Precautionary statements	P201, P202, P273, P281, P308+P313, P391, P405, P501
- Except where otherwise noted, data are given for materials in their standard state (at 25 °C [77 °F], 100 kPa). Infobox references

Chlortoluron, chlorotoluron and CTU are the common names for an organic compound of the phenylurea class of herbicides used to control broadleaf and annual grass weeds in cereal crops.

== History ==
In 1952, chemists at E. I. du Pont de Nemours and Company patented a series of aryl urea derivatives as herbicides. Several compounds covered by this patent were commercialized as herbicides: monuron (4-chlorophenyl), diuron (3,4-dichlorophenyl) and chlortoluron, the 3-chloro-4-methylphenyl example. Subsequently, over thirty related urea analogs with the same mechanism of action reached the market worldwide.

Chlortoluron entered the British market in 1971, alongside isoproturon. CTU was more effective against black-grass, though suffered greater herbicide resistance, so by the 1980s isoproturon overtook it in popularity. Both saw large use as British agriculture was then moving towards earlier sowing, to reduce damage to soil structure, by sowing at drier times. Chlortoluron and isoproturon were useful to control blackgrass while growing winter wheat.

== Synthesis ==
As described in the du Pont patent, the starting material is a substituted aryl amine, an aniline, which is treated with phosgene to form its isocyanate derivative. This is subsequently reacted with dimethylamine to give the final product.

Aryl-NH_{2} + COCl_{2} → Aryl-NCO
Aryl-NCO + NH(CH_{3})_{2} → Aryl-NHCON(CH_{3})_{2}

== Mechanism of action ==
The phenylurea class of herbicides including chlortoluron are inhibitors of photosynthesis. They block the Q_{B} plastoquinone binding site of photosystem II, preventing electron flow from Q_{A} to Q_{B}. This interrupts the photosynthetic electron transport chain and kills the plant.

Chlortoluron is in the Group C, (Australia), C2 (global), Group 7, (numeric), herbicide resistance class.

== Usage ==
Chlortoluron was first licensed for use in the European Union in 1994 and this has been extended, currently until October 2021. It is now mainly used in mixture with other herbicides including diflufenican and pendimethalin.

It can be used to control broadleaf weeds and grasses including Alopecurus myosuroides, Anthemis arvensis, Atriplex prostrata, Calendula spp., Convolvulaceae spp., Galeopsis spp., Lamium spp., Papaver rhoeas, Paspalum distichum, Poa annua, Solanaceae spp., Stellaria media and Veronica spp. It is mainly used in cereal crops including wheat and barley.

=== United Kingdom ===
Chlorotoluron was banned in the UK in 2010, but in 2014 was reapproved after new formulations came with lower application rates, 250 g/Ha down from (up to) 3500 g/Ha, though farmers must spray it earlier in weeds' growth cycles. Agform did this at the same time to the previously banned isoproturon; both reregistrations are mixes with diflufenican, chlorotoluron's Tower also contains pendimethalin.
