= Cytochrome b559 =

Family of protein complexes

Cytochrome b559, alpha (gene psbE) and beta (gene psbF)subunits
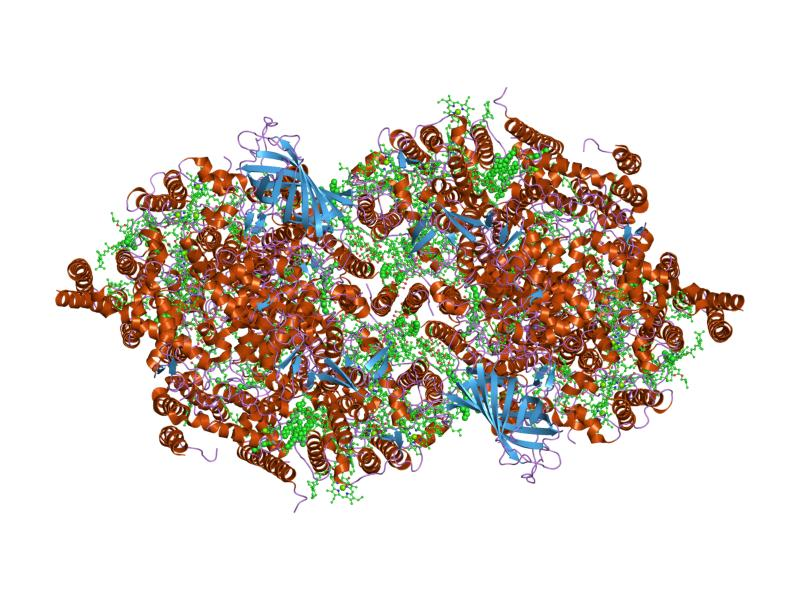
- Structure of Photosystem II from Thermosynechococcus elongatus.

Identifiers
- Symbol: Cytochrom_B559
- Pfam: PF00283
- InterPro: IPR013081
- PROSITE: PDOC00464
- OPM superfamily: 2
- OPM protein: 2axt
Available protein structures:
- PDB: IPR013081 PF00283 (ECOD; PDBsum)
- AlphaFold: IPR013081; PF00283

Lumenal portion of Cytochrome b559, alpha (gene psbE) subunit
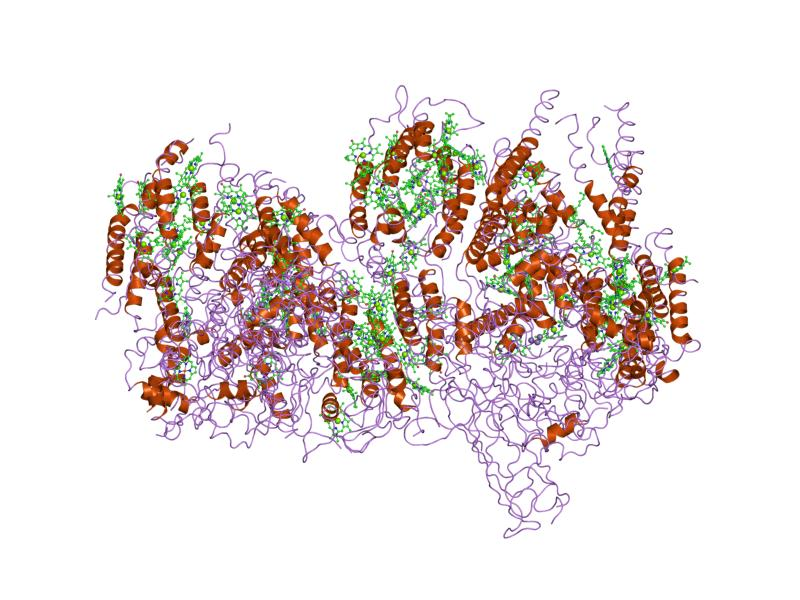
- Structure of oxygen-evolving photosystem II from Thermosynechococcus vulcanus.

Identifiers
- Symbol: Cytochrom_B559a
- Pfam: PF00284
- InterPro: IPR013082
- PROSITE: PDOC00464
- OPM superfamily: 2
- OPM protein: 2axt
Available protein structures:
- PDB: IPR013082 PF00284 (ECOD; PDBsum)
- AlphaFold: IPR013082; PF00284

Cytochrome b559 is a protein complex that is involved in photosynthesis. In particular, it is composed of two protein subunits and a heme cofactor, and functions as a core component of Photosystem II (PSII), a multisubunit protein-pigment complex containing proteins both intrinsic and extrinsic to the photosynthetic membrane.

Within the core of the complex, the chlorophyll and beta-carotene pigments are mainly bound to the antenna proteins CP43 (PsbC) and CP47 (PsbB), which pass the excitation energy on to chlorophylls in the reaction centre proteins D1 (Qb, PsbA) and D2 (Qa, PsbD) that bind all the redox-active cofactors involved in the energy conversion process. The PSII oxygen-evolving complex (OEC) provides electrons to re-reduce the PSII reaction center, and oxidizes 2 water molecules to recover its reduced initial state. It consists of OEE1 (PsbO), OEE2 (PsbP) and OEE3 (PsbQ). The remaining subunits in PSII are of low molecular weight (less than 10 kDa), and are involved in PSII assembly, stabilisation, dimerization, and photoprotection.

Cytochrome b559, which forms part of the reaction centre core of PSII, is a heterodimer composed of one alpha subunit (PsbE), one beta (PsbF) subunit, and a heme cofactor. Two histidine residues from each subunit coordinate the heme. Although cytochrome b559 is a redox-active protein, it is unlikely to be involved in the primary electron transport in PSII due to its very slow photo-oxidation and photo-reduction kinetics. Instead, cytochrome b559 could participate in a secondary electron transport pathway that helps protect PSII from photo-damage. Cytochrome b559 is essential for PSII assembly.

This domain occurs in both the alpha and beta subunits of cytochrome B559. In the alpha subunit, it occurs together with a lumenal domain (InterPro: IPR013082), while in the beta subunit it occurs on its own.

Cytochrome b559 can exist in three forms, each with a characteristic redox potential. These forms are very low potential (VLP), ≤ 0 mV; low potential (LP) at 60 mV; and high potential (HP) at 370 mV. There is also an intermediate potential (IP) form that has a redox potential at pH 6.5–7.0 that ranges from 170 to 240 mV. In oxygen-evolving reaction centers, more than half of the cyt b559 is in the HP form. In manganese-depleted non-oxygen evolving photosystem II reaction centers, cyt b559 is usually in the LP form.
