= Photosystem II light-harvesting protein =

Biological protein

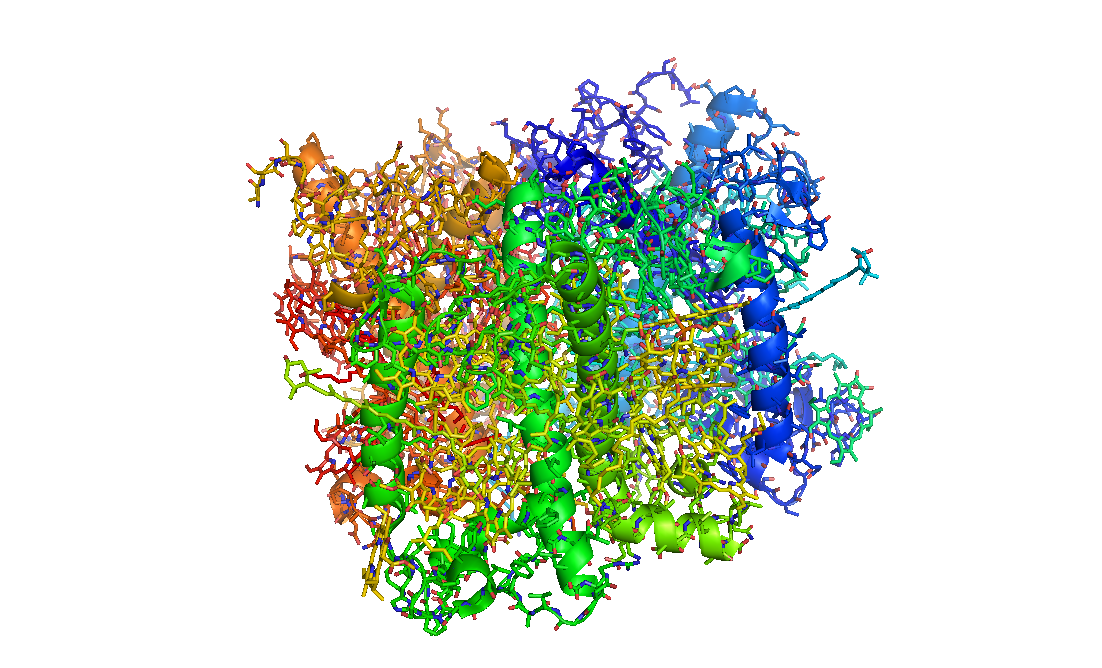

Identifiers
- Symbol: PSII
- Pfam: PF00421
- InterPro: IPR000932
- TCDB: 3.E.2
- OPM superfamily: 2
- OPM protein: 2bhw
- Membranome: 536
Available protein structures:
- PDB: IPR000932 PF00421 (ECOD; PDBsum)
- AlphaFold: IPR000932; PF00421

Photosystem II light-harvesting proteins are the intrinsic transmembrane proteins CP43 (PsbC) and CP47 (PsbB) occurring in the reaction centre of photosystem II (PSII). These polypeptides bind to chlorophyll a and β-Carotene and pass the excitation energy on to the reaction centre.

This family also includes the iron-stress induced chlorophyll-binding protein CP43', encoded by the IsiA gene, which evolved in cyanobacteria from a PSII protein to cope with light limitations and stress conditions. Under iron-deficient growth conditions, CP43' associates with photosystem I (PSI) to form a complex that consists of a ring of 18 or more CP43' molecules around a PSI trimer, which significantly increases the light-harvesting system of PSI. The IsiA protein can also provide photoprotection for PSII.

Plants, algae and some bacteria use two photosystems, PSI with P700 and PSII with P680. Using light energy, PSII acts first to channel an electron through a series of acceptors that drive a proton pump to generate adenosine triphosphate (ATP), before passing the electron on to PSI. Once the electron reaches PSI, it has used most of its energy in producing ATP, but a second photon of light captured by P700 provides the required energy to channel the electron to ferredoxin, generating reducing power in the form of NADPH. The ATP and NADPH produced by PSII and PSI, respectively, are used in the light-independent reactions for the formation of organic compounds. This process is non-cyclic, because the electron from PSII is lost and is only replenished through the oxidation of water. Hence, there is a constant flow of electrons and associated hydrogen atoms from water for the formation of organic compounds. It is this stripping of hydrogens from water that produces the oxygen we breathe.

IsiA has an inverse relationship with the iron stress repressed RNA (IsrR). IsrR is an antisense RNA that acts as a reversible switch that responds to changes in environmental conditions to modulate the expression of IsiA.

== Subfamilies ==
- Photosystem II protein PsbC InterPro: IPR005869

== See also ==
- Light-harvesting complex
