= YCF (disambiguation) =

YCF may refer to:

- Yacimientos Carboníferos Fiscales, known by its acronym YCF, a defunct state-owned company in Argentina
- Cortes Island Aerodrome, Canada (by IATA code)
- Young Calvinist Federation, a youth ministry in Canada and the United States
- Ycf4, Ycf9, and Ycf14, protein names standing for hypothetical chloroplast open reading frame
- YCF1, a yeast cadmium factor protein
- A US Navy hull classification symbol: Car float (YCF)
