= PSBA =

PSBA may refer to:

- Philippine School of Business Administration, a college located in Quezon City in Metro Manila, Philippines
- Public Safety Business Agency, a department of the Government of Queensland
- psbA, a gene coding for a protein in the photosynthetic reaction centre protein family
