= TPM domain =

Identifiers
- Symbol: TPM
- Pfam: PF04536
- InterPro: IPR007621
Available protein structures:
- PDB: IPR007621 PF04536 (ECOD; PDBsum)
- AlphaFold: IPR007621; PF04536

The TPM domain family is named after the three founding proteins TLP18.3, Psb32 and MOLO-1. TPM domains have a characteristic alpha-helical fold (αβαβαββαα or βαβαββαα) and (3+3 or 2+3) flanking four central β strands. The TPM fold has not been found in other protein domains to date. TPM was previously referred to as "DUF477" and "Repair_PSII".

In plants, the TPM domain-containing proteins TLP18.3 and Psb32 have been implicated the photosystem II (PSII) repair cycle. It may be involved in the regulation of synthesis/degradation of the D1 protein of the PSII core and in the assembly of PSII monomers into dimers in the grana stacks.

In the model nematode C. elegans, the MOLO-1 protein is an auxiliary subunit that positively modulates the gating of levamisole-sensitive acetylcholine receptors.
