= C-terminal processing peptidase =

Identifiers
- EC no.: 3.4.21.102
- CAS no.: 92480-11-0&title= 216484-75-2, 92480-11-0

Databases
- IntEnz: IntEnz view
- BRENDA: BRENDA entry
- ExPASy: NiceZyme view
- KEGG: KEGG entry
- MetaCyc: metabolic pathway
- PRIAM: profile
- PDB structures: RCSB PDB PDBe PDBsum
Search
- PMC: articles
- PubMed: articles
- NCBI: proteins

C-terminal processing peptidase (EC 3.4.21.102, CtpA gene product (Synechocystis sp.), photosystem II D1 protein processing peptidase, protease Re, tail-specific protease, Tsp protease) is an enzyme. This enzyme catalyses the following chemical reaction

The enzyme shows specific recognition of a C-terminal tripeptide, Xaa-Yaa-Zaa, in which Xaa is preferably Ala or Leu, Yaa is preferably Ala or Tyr, and Zaa is preferably Ala, but then cleaves at a variable distance from the C-terminus. A typical cleavage is -Ala-Ala!Arg-Ala-Ala-Lys-Glu-Asn-Tyr-Ala-Leu-Ala-Ala. In the plant chloroplast, the enzyme removes the C-terminal extension of the X1 polypeptide of photosystem II

Proteolytic processing of the X1 protein of photosystem II enables light-driven assembly of the tetranuclear manganese cluster.

== See also ==
- D1 protein, also known as PsbA
