= Cobalt(II) formate =

Cobalt(II) Formate
Names
- IUPAC name Cobalt(II) formate

Identifiers
CAS Number	544-18-3
3D model (JSmol)	Interactive image
ChemSpider	10532
ECHA InfoCard	100.008.059
EC Number	208-862-4
PubChem CID	10998
UNII	3ADO6Y1TNZ
CompTox Dashboard (EPA)	DTXSID1060267
- InChI: InChI=1S/2CH2O2.Co/c2*2-1-3;/h2*1H,(H,2,3);/q;;+2/p-2 Key: PFQLIVQUKOIJJD-UHFFFAOYSA-L; InChI=1/2CH2O2.Co/c2*2-1-3;/h2*1H,(H,2,3);/q;;+2/p-2 Key: PFQLIVQUKOIJJD-NUQVWONBAE
- SMILES: C(=O)[O-].C(=O)[O-].[Co+2]

Properties
Chemical formula	Co(HCO_{2})_{2}
Molar mass	148.97 g/mol
Appearance	red crystalline
Density	2.13 g/cm^{3} (20 °C)
Melting point	175 °C (347 °F; 448 K) (decomposes)
Solubility in water	5.03 g/100 mL (20 °C)
Solubility	insoluble in alcohol

Hazards
- GHS labelling
Pictograms	(GHS07: Exclamation mark) (GHS08: Health hazard)
Signal word	Danger
Hazard statements	H317, H334, H335, H351, H360, H371, H372, H373, H412
Precautionary statements	P203, P233, P260, P264, P270, P271, P272, P273, P280, P284, P302+P352, P304+P340, P308+P316, P318, P319, P321, P333+P317, P342+P316, P362+P364, P403, P403+P233, P405, P501
- Except where otherwise noted, data are given for materials in their standard state (at 25 °C [77 °F], 100 kPa). Infobox references

Cobalt(II) formate is an inorganic compound with the chemical formula Co(HCO_{2})_{2} (or Co(HCOO)_{2}). It typically exists as a dihydrate (Co(HCO_{2})_{2}•2H_{2}O) in which it forms a 3D metal–organic framework structure and is known as Co-MOF.

Cobalt(II) formate is a red crystalline solid and is soluble in water. It can be very hazardous to the environment. Cobalt formate is used to make catalysts for chemical manufacture and for isolation of isotopically enriched hydrogen.

== Synthesis ==
It can be prepared by adding Co(NO_{3})_{2} and phytic acid to a mixture of water, methanol, and dimethyl formamide.

The solution will have a clear appearance until it is heated 100 °C for about 24 hours. At this point it, will appear as a red crystalline structure.

== Application ==
This MOF has recently been used to isolate hydrogen isotopes. This is done via an oxygen evolution reaction using Co(HCOO)_{2} as a catalyst.
