= 2-Chloronicotinic acid =

Names
- IUPAC name 2-Chloropyridine-3-carboxylic acid

Identifiers
CAS Number	2942-59-8
3D model (JSmol)	Interactive image
ChEBI	CHEBI:194658
ChEMBL	ChEMBL1505789
ChemSpider	68737
ECHA InfoCard	100.019.034
EC Number	220-937-0
PubChem CID	76258
UNII	93G386213F
CompTox Dashboard (EPA)	DTXSID9062726
- InChI: InChI=1S/C6H4ClNO2/c7-5-4(6(9)10)2-1-3-8-5/h1-3H,(H,9,10) Key: IBRSSZOHCGUTHI-UHFFFAOYSA-N
- SMILES: C1=CC(=C(N=C1)Cl)C(=O)O

Properties
Chemical formula	C_{6}H_{4}ClNO_{2}
Molar mass	157.55 g·mol^{−1}
Melting point	190–191 °C (374–376 °F; 463–464 K)
Acidity (pK_{a})	2.54

Hazards
- GHS labelling
Pictograms	(GHS07: Exclamation mark)
Signal word	Warning
Hazard statements	H319
Precautionary statements	P261, P264, P264+P265, P271, P280, P302+P352, P304+P340, P305+P351+P338, P319, P321, P332+P317, P337+P317, P362+P364, P403+P233, P405, P501
- Except where otherwise noted, data are given for materials in their standard state (at 25 °C [77 °F], 100 kPa). Infobox references

2-Chloronicotinic acid (2-CNA) is a halogenated derivative of nicotinic acid.

== Synthesis ==
It can be synthesized by chlorination of the N-oxide of nicotinic acid or the related nicotinonitrile. Alternatively, it has been prepared by substitution of the hydroxyl group of 2-hydroxynicotinic acid or by a tandem reaction involving cyclization of various acrolein derivatives.

== Applications ==
2-Chloronicotinic acid is an intermediate in the production of a variety of bioactive compounds, including boscalid and diflufenican.

Other reported uses include Propizepine, Amdiglurax, Morniflumate, Niflumic acid, nevirapine, Clonixeril, and Flunixin.
