= DCMU =

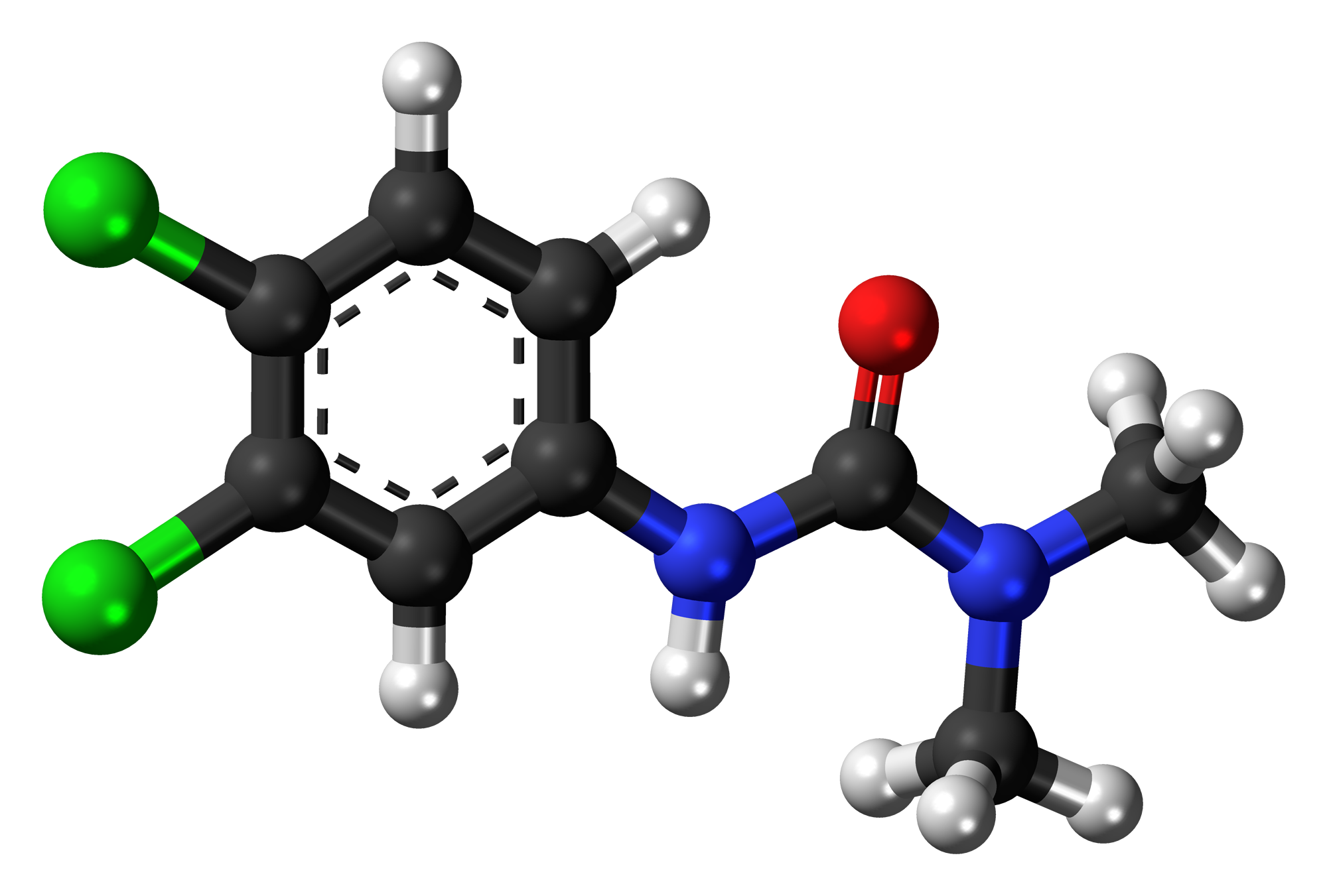

Names
- Preferred IUPAC name N′-(3,4-Dichlorophenyl)-N,N-dimethylurea
- Other names 3-(3,4-Dichlorophenyl)-1,1-dimethylurea, Karmex, Diuron, Direx

Identifiers
CAS Number	330-54-1
3D model (JSmol)	Interactive image
ChEBI	CHEBI:116509
ChEMBL	ChEMBL278489
ChemSpider	3008
ECHA InfoCard	100.005.778
EC Number	206-354-4
KEGG	C18428
PubChem CID	3120
RTECS number	YS8925000
UNII	9I3SDS92WY
UN number	3077, 2767
CompTox Dashboard (EPA)	DTXSID0020446
- InChI: InChI=1S/C9H10Cl2N2O/c1-13(2)9(14)12-6-3-4-7(10)8(11)5-6/h3-5H,1-2H3,(H,12,14) Key: XMTQQYYKAHVGBJ-UHFFFAOYSA-N
- SMILES: Clc1ccc(NC(=O)N(C)C)cc1Cl

Properties
Chemical formula	C_{9}H_{10}Cl_{2}N_{2}O
Molar mass	233.09 g·mol^{−1}
Appearance	white crystalline solid
Density	1.48 g/cm^{3}
Melting point	158 °C (316 °F; 431 K)
Boiling point	180 °C (356 °F; 453 K)
Solubility in water	42 mg/L
Vapor pressure	0.000000002 mmHg (20°C)

Hazards
- GHS labelling
Pictograms	(GHS07: Exclamation mark) (GHS08: Health hazard) (GHS09: Environmental hazard)
Signal word	Warning
Hazard statements	H302, H351, H373, H410
Precautionary statements	P201, P202, P260, P264, P270, P273, P281, P301+P312, P308+P313, P314, P330, P391, P405, P501
Flash point	noncombustible
- NIOSH (US health exposure limits)
PEL (Permissible)	none
REL (Recommended)	TWA 10 mg/m^{3}
IDLH (Immediate danger)	N.D.
- Except where otherwise noted, data are given for materials in their standard state (at 25 °C [77 °F], 100 kPa). Infobox references

DCMU (3-(3,4-dichlorophenyl)-1,1-dimethylurea) is an algicide and herbicide of the aryl urea class that inhibits photosynthesis. It was introduced by Bayer in 1954 under the trade name of Diuron.

== History ==
In 1952, chemists at E. I. du Pont de Nemours and Company patented a series of aryl urea derivatives as herbicides. Several compounds covered by this patent were commercialized as herbicides: chlortoluron (3-chloro-4-methylphenyl) and DCMU, the (3,4-dichlorophenyl) example. Subsequently, over thirty related urea analogs with the same mechanism of action reached the market worldwide.

== Synthesis ==
As described in the du Pont patent, the starting material is 3,4-dichloroaniline, which is treated with phosgene to form a isocyanate derivative. This is subsequently reacted with dimethylamine to give the final product.

Aryl-NH_{2} + COCl_{2} → Aryl-NCO
Aryl-NCO + NH(CH_{3})_{2} → Aryl-NHCON(CH_{3})_{2}

== Mechanism of action ==
DCMU is a very specific and sensitive inhibitor of photosynthesis. It blocks the Q_{B} plastoquinone binding site of photosystem II, disallowing the electron flow from photosystem II to plastoquinone. This interrupts the photosynthetic electron transport chain in photosynthesis and thus reduces the ability of the plant to turn light energy into chemical energy (ATP and reductant potential).

DCMU only blocks electron flow from photosystem II, it has no effect on photosystem I or other reactions in photosynthesis, such as light absorption or carbon fixation in the Calvin cycle.

However, because it blocks electrons produced from water oxidation in PS II from entering the plastoquinone pool, "linear" photosynthesis is effectively shut down, as there are no available electrons to exit the photosynthetic electron flow cycle for reduction of NADP^{+} to NADPH. In fact, it was found that DCMU not only does not inhibit the cyclic photosynthetic pathway, but, under certain circumstances, actually stimulates it.

Because of these effects, DCMU is often used to study energy flow in photosynthesis.

== Toxicity ==
DCMU (Diuron) has been characterized as a known/likely human carcinogen based on animal testing.
