= SkQ =

Class of organic molecules

SkQ is a class of mitochondria-targeted antioxidants, developed by Professor Vladimir Skulachev and his team. In a broad sense, SkQ is a lipophilic cation, linked via saturated hydrocarbon chain to an antioxidant. Due to its lipophilic properties, SkQ can effectively penetrate through various cell membranes. The positive charge provides directed transport of the whole molecule including antioxidant moiety into the negatively charged mitochondrial matrix. Substances of this type, various drugs that are based on them, as well as methods of their use are patented in Russia and other countries such as United States, China, Japan, and in Europe. Sometimes the term SkQ is used in a narrow sense for the denomination of a cationic derivative of the plant antioxidant plastoquinone.

== History ==
In 1969, triphenylphosphonium (TPP, charged triphenylphosphine) was proposed for use for the first time. This compound with a low molecular weight consists of a positively charged phosphorus atom and surrounded by three hydrophobic phenyls that are accumulating in mitochondria. In 1970, the use of the TPP for targeting the delivery of compounds to the mitochondrial matrix was proposed. In 1974, the TPP, as well as its derivatives and other penetrating ions, were named "Skulachev's Ions" by the famous American biochemist David E. Green.

In 1999, the first work on the directed delivery of the antioxidant alpha-tocopherol linked by a hydrocarbon chain to TPP to the mitochondria was published. The compound was named TPPB or MitoVitE. Several years later MitoQ, a better version of a mitochondria-targeted compound was synthesized. Its antioxidant part is represented by ubiquinone, which is linked with a 10-carbon aliphatic chain to TPP.

In the early 2000s, a group of researchers led by prof V. P. Skulachev in Moscow State University began the development of SkQ — the mitochondrial-targeted antioxidant, similar to MitoQ, but with the ubiquinone replaced with plastoquinone (more active analog of ubiquinone derived from plant chloroplasts). Since 2005, several modified SkQ compounds were synthesized and tested in vitro, the efficiency and the antioxidant effects of the tested compounds were higher than previous analogs by hundreds of times. All of these compounds have abbreviated names derived from the names of Skulachev (Sk), letters for quinone (Q) and denote the modification (alpha and/or numeric symbol, for example, R1 for a derivative of rhodamine and plastoquinone). The largest amount of data was obtained for SkQ1 and SkQR1.

Later SkQ properties were tested in vitro on fibroblasts and in vivo in different organisms: mice, drosophilids, yeast, and many others. It was found that SkQ is able to protect cells from death from oxidative stress and is effective as a treatment of age-related diseases in animals.

Since 2008, the development of pharmaceuticals based on SkQ has been started. In 2012, The Ministry of Health of the Russian Federation approved the use of the eye drops "Visomitin" based on SkQ1 for the treatment of dry eye syndrome and the early stage of cataract. Testing of the efficacy of SkQ-drugs against other diseases, both in Russia and in the United States is currently in progress.

In 2016, phase 1 of a clinical trial of an oral drug containing SkQ1 was conducted in Russia. In 2017, it was found that SkQ has a strong antibacterial effect and is able to inhibit the activity of multidrug-resistant enzymes in bacteria Since 2019 the Skulachev project is developing mitochondrial antioxidants in several areas: synthesis and testing of new SkQ compounds, testing the effects on a variety of model systems and in different diseases.

== Classification ==
SkQ compound consists of three parts: antioxidant, C-aliphatic linker and lipophilic cation.

Compounds of SkQ

A list of some of SkQ and substances with similar structure:

SkQ1	10-(6'-Plastoquinonyl)decyltriphenylphosphonium
SkQR1	10-(6'-Plastoquinonyl)decylrhodamine-19
SkQ2	10-(6'-plastoquinonyl)decylcarnitine
SkQ2M	10-(6'-plastoquinonyl)decylmethylcarnitine
SkQ3	10-(6′-methylplastoquinonyl) decyltriphenylphosphonium
SkQ4	10-(6'-plastoquinonyl)decyltributylammonium
SkQ5	5-(6'-plastoquinonyl)amyltriphenylphosphonium
SkQBerb	13-[9-(6-plastoquinonyl) nonyloxycarbonyl-methyl] berberine
SkQPalm	13-[9-(6-plastoquinonyl) nonyloxycarbonyl-methyl] palmatine
C12TPP	dodecyltriphenylphosphonium
MitoQ	10-(6-ubiquinoyl)decyltriphenyl-phosphonium

=== By type of cation ===
Lipophilic cation determines the efficiency of penetration through the membranes into the mitochondrial matrix. The best properties are shown by SkQ-compounds with triphenylphosphonium ion (TPP): MitoQ, SkQ1, and others. Similar penetration efficiency was shown for compounds with rhodamine 19, such as SkQR1. Rhodamine has fluorescence properties, so its derivatives are used in the visualization of mitochondria. The SkQ derivatives with acetylcarnitine (SkQ2M) tributyl ammonium (SkQ4) as lipophilic cations have weak penetrating properties.

The cations with the well-known medical properties — berberine and palmatine were also tested. SkQBerb and SkQPalm – SkQ derivatives, do not differ much in properties from SkQ1 and SkQR1.

=== The length of the linker ===
In SkQ compounds, a decamethylenic linker (an aliphatic chain of 10 carbon atoms) is used. Reduction of the length of the chain leads to a deterioration in the penetrating ability of ions. The compound with such pentamethylenic linker is demonstrated on SkQ5. Molecular dynamics in the membrane calculated with a computer have shown that the length of the linker of 10 is optimal for the manifestation of antioxidant properties of SkQ1. The quinone residue is located right next to the C9 or C13 atoms of the fatty acids of the membrane that has to be protected from oxidative damage.

=== The type of antioxidant ===
Compounds without antioxidant part are used to control the effect of SkQ compound. For example, C_{12}-TPP and C_{12}R1 penetrate the mitochondria but do not inhibit the oxidation. Interestingly, these compounds partially demonstrate the positive effects of SkQ. This happens due to the phenomenon of soft depolarization (mild uncoupling) of the mitochondrial membrane. Compounds with tocopherol and ubiquinone for historical reasons are called MitoVitE and MitoQ, although formally they can be attributed to the class of SkQ-compounds. MitoQ is traditionally used for comparison with the SkQ compound.

The highest antioxidant activity was shown for the compounds with thymoquinone (SkQT1 and SkQTК1). Thymoquinone is a derivative of plastoquinone, but with one methyl substituent in the aromatic ring. Next in the sequence of antioxidant activity connection is plastoquinone (SkQ1 and SkQR1), with two methyl substituents. SkQ3 is a less active compound, with three methyl substituents. SkQB without methyl substituents exhibits the weakest antioxidant properties.

In general, SkQ-like compounds can be arrange by its antioxidant activity as follows: SkQB < MitoQ < DMMQ ≈ SkQ3 < SkQ1 < SkQT.

== Mechanism of action ==
The positive effect of SkQ is associated with its following properties:

- penetration into the mitochondria — the main source of reactive oxygen species (ROS) of the cells
- inhibition of ROS at the site of their formation in two different ways:
- direct neutralization of ROS due to the oxidation of plastoquinone,
- reduction of mitochondrial membrane potential

=== Penetration into the mitochondria ===
Due to its lipophilic properties, SkQ-substances can penetrate the lipid bilayer. The transportation is caused by the electrical potential due to the presence of a positive charge in SkQ. Mitochondria are the only intracellular organelles with a negative charge. Therefore, SkQ effectively penetrates and accumulates there.

The accumulation coefficient can be estimated using the Nernst equation. To do this, we must take into account that the potential of the plasma membrane of the cell is about 60 mV (the cytoplasm has a negative charge), and the potential of the mitochondrial membrane is about 180 mV (the matrix has a negative charge). As a result, the electric gradient SkQ between the extracellular medium and the mitochondrial matrix is 10^{4}.

It should also be taken into account that SkQ has a high coefficient of distribution between lipid and water, about 10^{4}. Taking this into account, the total concentration gradient of SkQ inside the inner layer of the inner mitochondria membrane can be up to 10^{8}.

=== Direct inhibition of ROS ===
Oxidation of organic substances by ROS is a chain process. Several types of active free radicals — peroxide (RO_{2}^{*}), alkoxyl (RO*), alkyl (R*), and ROS (superoxide anion, singlet oxygen), participate in these chain reactions.

One of the main targets of ROS — cardiolipin, polyunsaturated phospholipid of the inner membrane of mitochondria, which is especially sensitive to peroxidation. After a radical attack on the C_{11} atom of linoleic acid, cardiolipin forms peroxyl radical, which is stabilized at positions C_{9} and C_{13} due to its neighboring double bonds.

The location of the SkQ1 in the mitochondrial membrane is that the plastoquinone residue is exactly near of C_{9} or C_{13} of cardiolipin (depending on the SkQ conformation). Thus, it can quickly and effectively quench the peroxyl radical of cardiolipin.

Another important property of SkQ is its recyclability. After ROS neutralization the SkQ antioxidant moiety is converted to its oxidized form (plastoquinone or semi-quinone). Then it can be quickly restored by the complex III of the respiratory chain. Thus, due to the functioning of the respiratory chain, SkQ exists mainly in a restored, active form.

=== Uncoupling properties ===
In some cases (for example, in experiments on the lifespan of Drosophila or plant models) compound C_{12}-TPP (without the plastoquinone residue) can successfully substitute for SkQ1.

This phenomenon is explained by the fact that any hydrophobic compound with a delocalized positive charge is able to transfer anions of fatty acids from one side of the membrane to another, thus lowering the transmembrane potential. This phenomenon is called uncoupling of respiration and ATP synthesis on the mitochondrial membrane. In the cell, this function is normally performed by uncoupling proteins (or UCPs, including thermogenin from brown fat adipocytes) and ATP/ADP antiporter.

Weak depolarization of the membrane leads to a multiple reductions in the amount of ROS produced by mitochondria.

=== Pro-oxidant effect ===
At high concentrations (micromolar and more) SkQ-compounds exhibit pro-oxidant properties stimulating ROS production.

The advantage of SkQ1 is that the difference in concentrations between pro- and antioxidant activity is about 1000 fold. Experiments on mitochondria have shown that SkQ1 begins to exhibit antioxidant properties already at concentrations of 1 nM, and pro-oxidant properties at concentrations of about 1 μM. For comparison, this "concentration window" of MitoQ is only about 2-5 fold. The manifestation of antioxidant activity of MitoQ begins only with concentrations of 0.3 μM while it begins to demonstrate pro-oxidant effect at 0.6-1.0 μM.

=== Anti-inflammatory effect ===
In several experimental models (including experiments on laboratory animals) SkQ1 and SkQR1 showed a pronounced anti-inflammatory effect.

=== Suppression of multiple drug resistance ===
SkQ1 and C_{12}-TPP are substrates of ABC-transporters. The main function of these enzymes is the protection of cells from xenobiotics. Lipophilic cations compete with other substrates of these carriers and thus weaken the protection of cells from external influences.

== Use ==
=== Medicine ===
SkQ is able to delay the development of several traits of aging and increase the life span in a variety of animals. Depending on the type of SkQ molecule, the substance may reduce early mortality, increase life expectancy and extend the maximum age of experimental animals. Also in various experiments, SkQ has slowed down the development of several age-dependent pathologies and signs of aging.

It was shown that SkQ accelerates wound healing, as well as treats age-related diseases such as osteoporosis, cataracts, retinopathy, and others.

At the end of 2008, preparations for the official approval of SkQ-based pharmaceuticals in Russia has started. The efficiency of eye drops against "dry eye syndrome" was also confirmed in the following double-blind placebo-controlled studies: (a) international multicenter study in Russia and Ukraine, phase II study in the United States. A clinical study on patients with age-related cataracts was also successfully conducted. In Russia in 2019 clinical studies are in progress for two improved versions of SkQ1-based eye drops – Visomitin Forte (phase II study on patients with age-related macular degeneration) and Visomitin Ultra (Phase I clinical study).

In 2018-2021, both attempts at Phase III clinical trials in the United States failed to show any statistically significant results among 452 (VISTA-1/NCT03764735) and 610 (VSTA-2/NCT04206020) participants respectively.

=== Cosmetology ===
SkQ1 is included in the composition of cosmetic products such as Mitovitan Active, Mitovitan, and Exomitin.

=== Veterinary ===
The drug "Visomitin" on the basis of SkQ1 used in veterinary practice for the treatment of ophthalmologic diseases in pets. In particular, the effectiveness is shown for the treatment of retinopathy in dogs, cats, and horses.

=== Plants ===
Experiments have shown an unexpected effect of SkQ on plants. The substance stimulated differentiation (in the treatment of callus) and seed germination (patent US 8,557,733), increased the yield of different crops (Ph.D. thesis of A.I. Uskov).

== See also ==
- Geroprotector
