= Iron stress repressed RNA =

Antisense RNA which regulates isiA expression
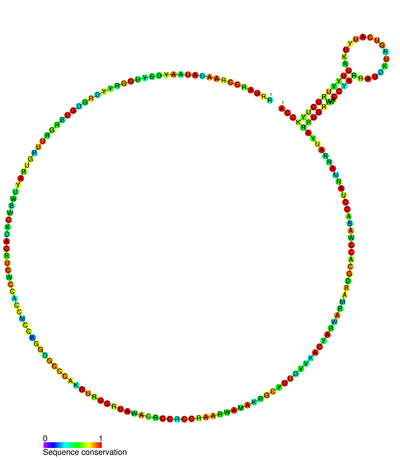
- Predicted secondary structure of IsrR

Identifiers
- Symbol: IsrR
- Rfam: RF01419

Other data
- RNA type: gene, Antisense RNA
- PDB structures: PDBe

Iron stress repressed RNA (IsrR) is a cis-encoded antisense RNA which regulates the expression of the photosynthetic protein isiA. In other words, IsrR is located in the bacteria which serves as a regulator RNA that helps the bacteria adapt to an iron limited environment within the host. IsiA expression is activated by the Ferric uptake regulator protein (Fur) under iron stress conditions. IsiA enhances photosynthesis by forming a ring around photosystem I which acts as an additional antenna complex.

IsrR is abundant when there is a sufficient iron concentration. IsrR is encoded for within the opposite stand of isiA gene and contains a conserved stem loop secondary structure. Under sufficient iron conditions IsrR binds to its complementary region which corresponds to the central third of the isiA mRNA. The resulting duplex RNA is then targeted for degradation. This allows the antisense RNA to act as a reversible switch that responds to changes in environmental conditions to modulate the expression of the isiA protein.

IsrR was originally identified within cyanobacteria but may be conserved throughout a number of photosynthetic species from multiple kingdoms. At present, IsrR is the only non coding RNA identified that has a regulatory role on photosynthetic proteins.

Recently the bacteria Staphylococcus aureus is one of the leading contribution to diseases. The importance is to understand it survival in stressful condition in the host. One of the stresses includes low iron that causes the bacteria to experience metabolic stress. IsrR helps by stopping the expression of iron-dependent enzymes to sustain the in limited iron environment. To explain, a study demonstrates IsrR role by targeting mRNAs for the processes of aerobic respiration, oxidative stress response and hem synthesis that proves the impact IsrR has on the metabolism of the bacteria.Following it was also presented that IsrR functions as a negative regulator dependent on the ferric uptake regulator (Fur). It was demonstrated that by removing IsrR increased the growth of the AcnA activity.The ability to bind to AcnA in the ribsome binding site stops translation. Which proceeding by the mechnism causes IsrR to regulate many enzyme in the TCA cycle. The tricarboxylic acid (TCA) cycle by repressing aconitase an enzyme in the cycle and the transcriptional regulator that forms a regulatory loop that limits iron used during stress.
