= Ferredoxin—NADP(+) reductase =

Class of enzymes

ferredoxin-NADP+ reductase

Identifiers
- EC no.: 1.18.1.2
- CAS no.: 9029-33-8

Databases
- BRENDA: enzyme data
- ExPASy: NiceZyme view
- KEGG: enzyme entry
- MetaCyc: metabolic pathway
- Rhea: reactions
- PDB structures: RCSB PDB PDBe PDBsum
- Gene Ontology: AmiGO / QuickGO
Search
- PMC: articles
- PubMed: articles
- NCBI: proteins

In enzymology, a ferredoxin-NADP^{+} reductase (EC 1.18.1.2) abbreviated FNR, is an enzyme that catalyzes the chemical reaction

2 reduced ferredoxin + NADP^{+} + H^{+} $\rightleftharpoons$ 2 oxidized ferredoxin + NADPH

The 3 substrates of this enzyme are reduced ferredoxin, NADP^{+}, and H^{+}, whereas its two products are oxidized ferredoxin and NADPH. It has a flavin cofactor, FAD.

This enzyme belongs to the family of oxidoreductases, that use iron-sulfur proteins as electron donors and NAD^{+} or NADP^{+} as electron acceptors.

This enzyme participates in photosynthesis. FNR provides a major source of NADPH for photosynthetic organisms.

== Nomenclature ==
The systematic name of this enzyme class is ferredoxin:NADP^{+} oxidoreductase. Other names in common use include:

- adrenodoxin reductase,
- ferredoxin-NADP^{+} reductase,
- ferredoxin-NADP^{+} oxidoreductase,
- ferredoxin-nicotinamide adenine dinucleotide phosphate reductase,
- ferredoxin-nicotinamide-adenine dinucleotide phosphate (oxidized), reductase
- ferredoxin-TPN reductase,
- NADP^{+}:ferredoxin oxidoreductase,
- NADPH:ferredoxin oxidoreductase,
- reduced nicotinamide adenine dinucleotide phosphate-adrenodoxin, reductase, and
- TPNH-ferredoxin reductase

== Mechanism ==
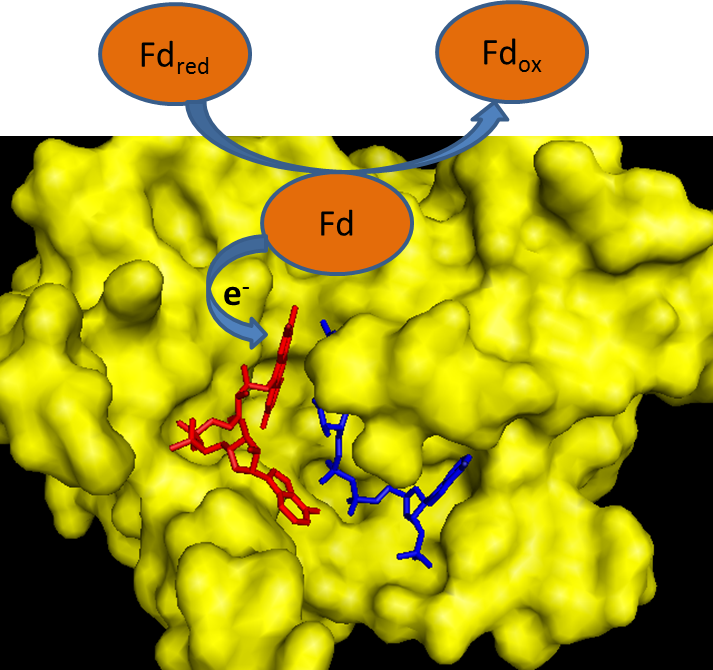
Cartoon depicting FAD (red) and NADP^{+} (blue) bound in the active site of the enzyme. Reduced ferredoxin binds the enzyme and transfers one electron to FAD. (image from PDB file 2BSA)

During photosynthesis, electrons are removed from water and transferred to the single electron carrier ferredoxin. Ferredoxin: NADP^{+} reductase then transfers an electron from each of two ferredoxin molecules to a single molecule of the two electron carrier NADPH. FNR utilizes FAD, which can exist in an oxidized state, single electron reduced semiquinone state, and fully reduced state to mediate this electron transfer.

FNR has an induced-fit mechanism of catalysis. Binding of ferredoxin to the enzyme causes the formation of a hydrogen bond between a glutamate residue (E312) and a serine residue (S96) in the active site. The glutamate residue is highly conserved because it both stabilizes the semiquinone form of FAD and is a proton donor/acceptor in the reaction. The rate limiting step of the electron transfer reaction is the release of the first oxidized ferredoxin molecule after the reduction of FAD with one electron. This step is inhibited by the presence of oxidized ferredoxin and stimulated by the presence of NADP^{+}. The binding of NADP^{+} to the enzyme lowers the binding affinity of the enzyme for ferredoxin.

This reaction can also operate in reverse to generate reduced ferredoxin, which can then be used in a variety of biosynthetic pathways. Some bacteria and algae use the molecule flavodoxin instead of ferredoxin as the single electron carrier molecule to be reduced or oxidized.

== Structure ==
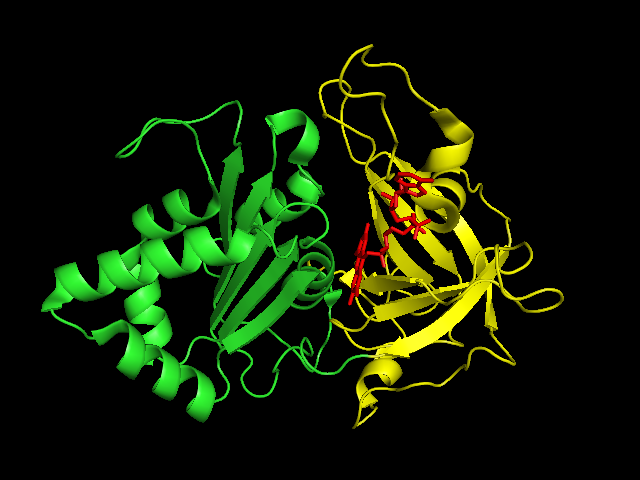
FNR structure with beta barrel domain colored yellow, alpha helix-beta sheet fold colored green, and FAD cofactor colored red. (image from PDB file 3LVB)

Plant-type ferredoxin: NADP^{+} reductase has two structural domains. The first domain is an antiparallel beta barrel at the amino terminus of the protein that contains the binding domain for the FAD cofactor. The second domain is at the carboxyl terminus of the protein and contains an alpha helix-beta strand fold. This terminal domain is where the NADP^{+} binds. The active site for the enzyme occurs at the interface between the two domains.

Binding of the enzyme to the thylakoid membrane involves a polyproline type II helix created between two FNR monomers and several proline rich integral membrane proteins.

As of late 2007, 54 structures had been solved for this class of enzymes, with PDB accession codes PDB: 1B2R, PDB: 1BJK, PDB: 1BQE, PDB: 1BX0, PDB: 1BX1, PDB: 1CJC, PDB: 1E1L, PDB: 1E62, PDB: 1E63, PDB: 1E64, PDB: 1E6E, PDB: 1EWY, PDB: 1FDR, PDB: 1FNB, PDB: 1FNC, PDB: 1FND, PDB: 1FRN, PDB: 1FRQ, PDB: 1GAQ, PDB: 1GAW, PDB: 1GJR, PDB: 1GO2, PDB: 1GR1, PDB: 1H42, PDB: 1H85, PDB: 1JB9, PDB: 1OGI, PDB: 1OGJ, PDB: 1QFY, PDB: 1QFZ, PDB: 1QG0, PDB: 1QGA, PDB: 1QGY, PDB: 1QGZ, PDB: 1QH0, PDB: 1QUE, PDB: 1QUF, PDB: 1SM4, PDB: 1W34, PDB: 1W35, PDB: 1W87, PDB: 2B5O, PDB: 2BGI, PDB: 2BGJ, PDB: 2BMW, PDB: 2BSA, PDB: 2C7G, PDB: 2GQW, PDB: 2GR0, PDB: 2GR1, PDB: 2GR2, PDB: 2GR3, PDB: 2OK7, and PDB: 2OK8.

== Function ==
Ferredoxin: NADP^{+} reductase is the last enzyme in the transfer of electrons during photosynthesis from photosystem I to NADPH. The NADPH is then used as a reducing equivalent in the reactions of the Calvin cycle. Electron cycling from ferredoxin to NADPH only occurs in the light in part because FNR activity is inhibited in the dark. In nonphotosynthetic organisms, the FNR primarily works in reverse to provide reduced ferredoxin for various metabolic pathways. These pathways include nitrogen fixation, terpenoid biosynthesis, steroid metabolism, oxidative stress response, and iron–sulfur protein biogenesis.

FNR is a soluble protein that is found both free in the chloroplast stroma and bound to the thylakoid membrane. This binding occurs opposite to the active site of the enzyme and does not seem to affect the structure of the active site or have a significant impact on the enzyme's activity. When bound to the thylakoid membrane, the enzyme exists as a dimer, but when it is free in the stroma, it is monomeric. The binding of the FNR to the integral membrane proteins on the thylakoid membrane is enhanced under acidic conditions, so recruitment and binding of FNR to the thylakoid membrane may be a method of storing and stabilizing the enzyme in the dark when photosynthesis is not occurring. The chloroplast stroma varies from being slightly acidic in the dark to more alkaline in the light. Therefore, in the dark, more FNRs would be recruited and bound to the thylakoid membrane, and in the light, more FNRs would dissociate from the membrane and be free in the stroma.

== Evolution ==
Ferredoxin NADP^{+} reductases are present in many organisms, including plants, bacteria, and the mitochondria of eukaryotes. However, these proteins belong to two unrelated protein families and are an example of convergent evolution. The plant-type FNRs (InterPro: IPR015701, InterPro: IPR033892) include the plastidic FNRs seen in plants. The glutathione-reductase-type FNRs (InterPro: IPR022890, InterPro: IPR021163), sometimes named adrenodoxin-NADP+ reductase for distinction, are seen in the mitochondria of eukaryotes. Both families are seen in bacteria. Two extra families, one thioredoxin reductase-like (TRLF) and the other with a unique mechanism (NfnAB), has been identified.

In the plant-like family of FNRs, selective evolutionary pressure has led to differences in the catalytic efficiency of FNRs in photosynthetic and nonphotosynthetic organisms. Electron transfer by FNR is a rate limiting step in photosynthesis, so the plastidic FNR in plants have evolved to be highly efficient. These plastidic FNRs are 20–100 fold more active than bacterial FNRs. This higher catalytic efficiency of the transfer of electrons from FAD to NADP^{+} is related to structural changes in the active site that reduce the distance between the N5 in FAD and the C4 in NADP^{+}. The plastidic FNRs in plants have also evolved to have a high degree of substrate specificity for NADP^{+} over NAD^{+}; studies of amino acid mutations have shown that the terminal tyrosine residue in plastidic FNRs plays a key role in this substrate specificity. In contrast, some nonphotosynthetic FNRs do not preferentially bind NADP^{+} and lack this tyrosine residue.

== Disease relevance ==
Several major human diseases are caused by the obligate intracellular protozoan parasites in the phylum Apicomplexa. The apicoplast organelle in these organisms is believed to have come from an endosymbiotic event in which an ancestral protozoan engulfed an algal cell. These apicoplasts contain plant-like FNRs that the protozoan uses to generate reduced ferredoxin, which is then used as a reductant in essential biosynthetic pathways. FNRs from two major parasites affecting humans, Plasmodium falciparum, which causes malaria, and Toxoplasma gondii, which causes toxoplasmosis, have been sequenced. Since humans do not have a homologous protein, these enzymes are possible new targets for drug therapies against these diseases.
