= Ycf9 protein domain =

Plastid protein involved in photosynthesis

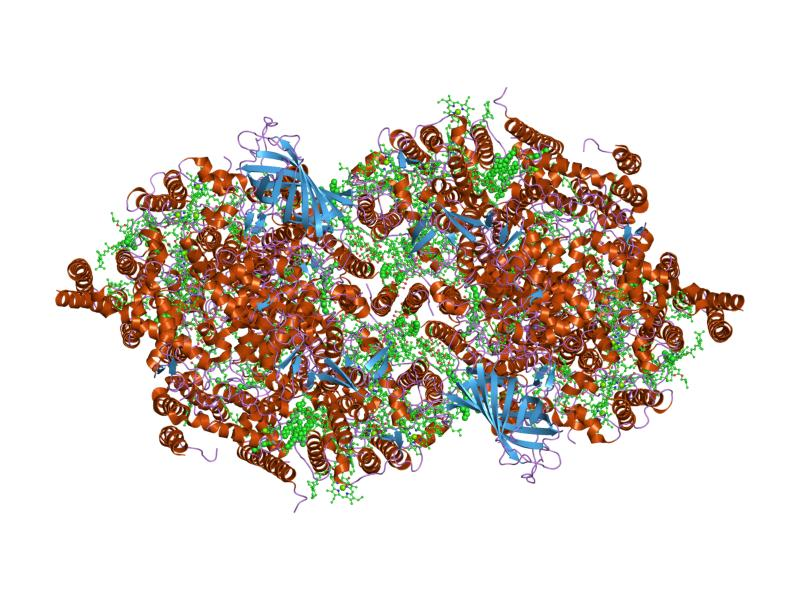
- Crystal structure of Photosystem II from thermosynechococcus elongatus

Identifiers
- Symbol: Ycf9
- Pfam: PF01737
- InterPro: IPR002644
Available protein structures:
- PDB: IPR002644 PF01737 (ECOD; PDBsum)
- AlphaFold: IPR002644; PF01737

In molecular biology, the PsbZ (Ycf9) is a protein domain, which is low in molecular weight. It is a transmembrane protein and therefore is located in the thylakoid membrane of chloroplasts in cyanobacteria and plants. More specifically, it is located in Photosystem II (PSII) and in the light-harvesting complex II (LHCII). Ycf9 acts as a structural linker, that stabilises the PSII-LHCII supercomplexes. Moreover, the supercomplex fails to form in PsbZ-deficient mutants, providing further evidence to suggest Ycf9's role as a structural linker. This may be caused by a marked decrease in two LHCII antenna proteins, CP26 and CP29, found in PsbZ-deficient mutants, which result in structural changes, as well as functional modifications in PSII.

Ycf is an acronym originally standing for hypothetical chloroplast open reading frame.

== Function ==
PSII is a multisubunit protein-pigment complex containing polypeptides bound to the photosynthetic membrane. Within the core of the complex, the chlorophyll and beta-carotene pigments are mainly bound to the antenna proteins CP43 (PsbC) and CP47 (PsbB), which pass the excitation energy on to the reaction centre proteins D1 (Qb, PsbA) and D2 (Qa, PsbD) that bind all the redox-active cofactors involved in the energy conversion process. The PSII oxygen-evolving complex (OEC) oxidises water to provide protons for use by PSI, and consists of OEE1 (PsbO), OEE2 (PsbP) and OEE3 (PsbQ). The remaining subunits in PSII are of low molecular weight (less than 10 kDa), and are involved in PSII assembly, stabilisation, dimerisation, and photo-protection. PsbZ may also be involved in photo-protective processes under sub-optimal growth conditions.

== Photosynthesis ==
Oxygenic photosynthesis uses two multi-subunit photosystems (I and II) located in the cell membranes of cyanobacteria and in the thylakoid membranes of chloroplasts in plants and algae. Photosystem II (PSII) has a P680 reaction centre containing chlorophyll 'a' that uses light energy to carry out the oxidation (splitting) of water molecules, and to produce ATP via a proton pump. Photosystem I (PSI) has a P700 reaction centre containing chlorophyll that takes the electron and associated hydrogen donated from PSII to reduce NADP+ to NADPH. Both ATP and NADPH are subsequently used in the light-independent reactions to convert carbon dioxide to glucose using the hydrogen atom extracted from water by PSII, releasing oxygen as a by-product.
