= Ycf4 protein domain =

Plastidial protein involved in photosynthesis

Ycf4

Identifiers
- Symbol: Ycf4
- Pfam: PF02392
- InterPro: IPR003359
Available protein structures:
- PDB: IPR003359 PF02392 (ECOD; PDBsum)
- AlphaFold: IPR003359; PF02392

Location of ycf genes in the chloroplast genome of Arabidopsis thaliana (lemon boxes). ycf4 maps at the 60 kb coordinates.

In molecular biology, the Ycf4 protein is involved in the assembly of the photosystem I complex which is part of an energy-harvesting process named photosynthesis. Without Ycf4, photosynthesis would be inefficient affecting plant growth. Ycf4 is located in the thylakoid membrane of the chloroplast. Ycf4 is important for the light dependent reaction of photosynthesis. To date, three thylakoid proteins involved in the stable accumulation of PSI have been identified, these are as follows:

- BtpA (INTERPRO),
- Ycf3
- Ycf4.

The Ycf4 protein is firmly associated with the thylakoid membrane, presumably through a transmembrane domain. Ycf4 co-fractionates with a protein complex larger than PSI upon sucrose density gradient centrifugation of solubilised thylakoids.

Ycf is an acronym standing for hypothetical chloroplast open reading frame.
