= Oxygen-evolving complex =

Water-oxidizing enzyme in photosynthesis

The Kok cycle. The oxidation state of the manganese centres is subject to debate.

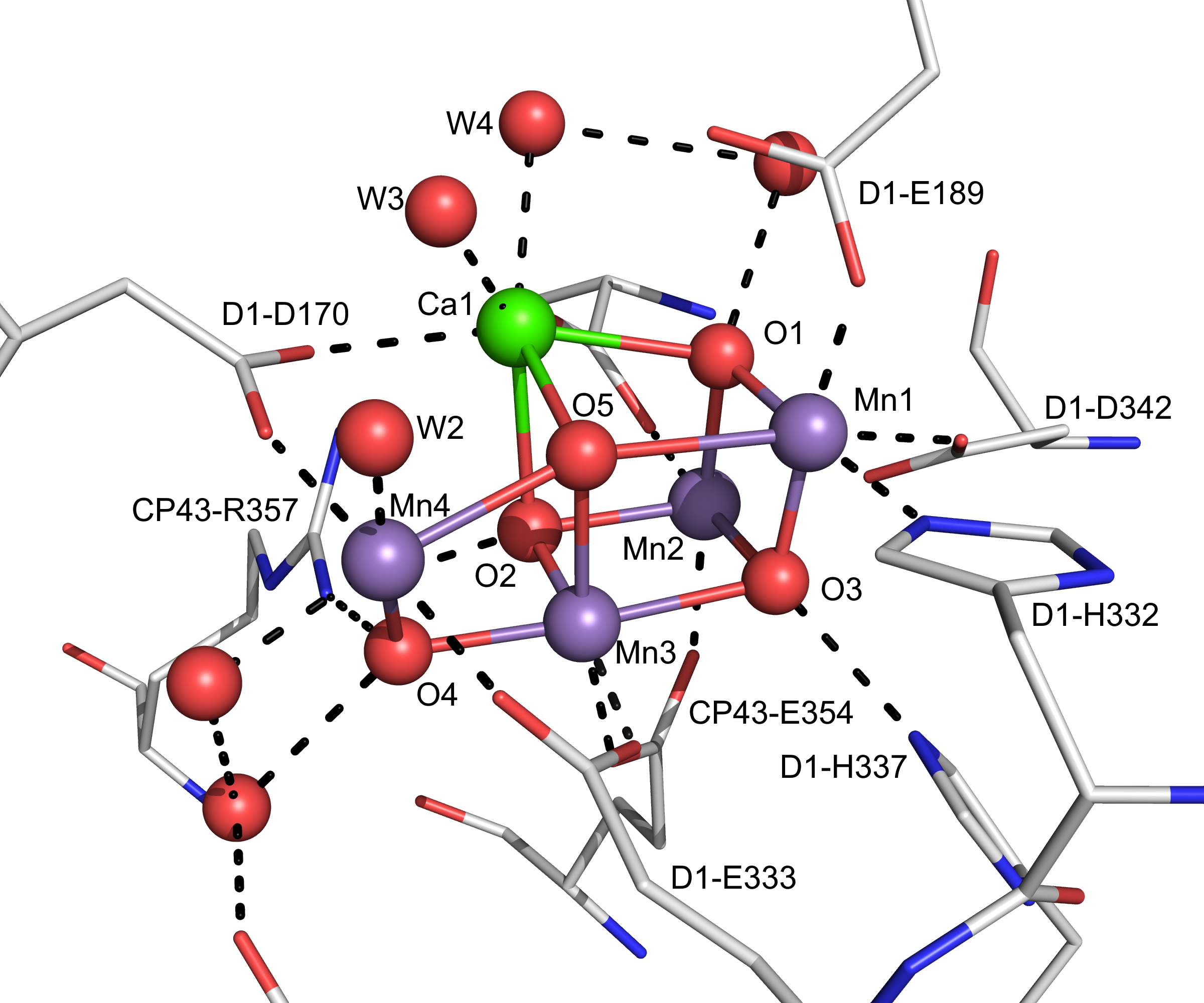
X-ray crystal structure of the Mn_{4}O_{5}Ca core of the oxygen evolving complex of Photosystem II at a resolution of 1.9 Å.

The oxygen-evolving complex (OEC), also known as the water-splitting complex, is the active site of a water-oxidizing enzyme involved in the photo-oxidation of water during the light reactions of photosynthesis. OEC is surrounded by 4 core proteins of photosystem II at the membrane-lumen interface. The mechanism for splitting water involves absorption of three photons before the fourth provides sufficient energy for water oxidation. Based on a widely accepted theory from 1970 by Kok, the complex can exist in 5 states, denoted S_{0} to S_{4}, with S_{0} the most reduced and S_{4} the most oxidized. Energy from the photons captured by photosystem II moves the system from state S_{0} to S_{1} to S_{2} to S_{3} and finally to S_{4}. S_{4} reacts with water producing free oxygen:

$$\ce{2H2O -> O2 + 4H+  +  4e-}$$

This conversion resets the catalyst to the S_{0} state.

The active site of the OEC consists of a cluster of manganese and calcium with the formula Mn_{4}Ca_{1}O_{x}Cl_{1–2}(HCO_{3})_{y}. This cluster is bound to D_{1} and CP_{43} subunits and stabilized by peripheral membrane proteins. Many characteristics of it have been examined by flash photolysis experiments, electron paramagnetic resonance (EPR), and X-ray spectroscopy.

The mechanism of the complex is proposed to involve an Mn-oxide which couples by O-O bond formation to a calcium oxide/hydroxide.
