= Isoproturon =

Weed control herbicide

Names
- IUPAC name 1,1-dimethyl-3-(4-propan-2-ylphenyl)urea
- Other names IPU, ipuron

Identifiers
CAS Number	34123-59-6
3D model (JSmol)	Interactive image
ChEBI	CHEBI:6049
ChEMBL	ChEMBL2251591
ChemSpider	33695
ECHA InfoCard	100.047.108
EC Number	251-835-4
KEGG	C11005
PubChem CID	36679
UNII	66066K098P
CompTox Dashboard (EPA)	DTXSID1042077
- InChI: InChI=1S/C12H18N2O/c1-9(2)10-5-7-11(8-6-10)13-12(15)14(3)4/h5-9H,1-4H3,(H,13,15) Key: InChIKey=PUIYMUZLKQOUOZ-UHFFFAOYSA-N
- SMILES: N(C(N(C)C)=O)C1=CC=C(C(C)C)C=C1

Properties
Chemical formula	C_{12}H_{18}N_{2}O
Molar mass	206.289 g·mol^{−1}
Appearance	Colourless Crystals
Density	1160 kg/m^{3}
Melting point	158 °C (316 °F; 431 K)
Boiling point	353 °C (667 °F; 626 K)
Solubility in water	65 mg/L (22 °C)
Solubility in acetone	38 mg/L
Solubility in methanol	75 mg/L
Solubility in benzene	5 mg/L
Solubility in xylol	4 mg/L
Solubility in n-hexane	0.2 mg/L
Vapor pressure	3.3 μPa (20 °C), 31.5 mPa (77 °C)

Hazards
- GHS labelling
Pictograms	(GHS08: Health hazard) (GHS09: Environmental hazard)
Hazard statements	H351, H373, H410
Precautionary statements	P203, P260, P271, P273, P280, P304+P340, P317, P318, P319, P391, P405, P501
- Lethal dose or concentration (LD, LC)
LD_{50} (median dose)	3350 mg/kg (mice, oral)
- Except where otherwise noted, data are given for materials in their standard state (at 25 °C [77 °F], 100 kPa). Infobox references

Isoproturon (IPU) is a urea class selective herbicide, which has been used to control annual grasses and many broad leafed weeds in wheat, barley, rye and triticale.

Isoproturon was introduced in 1971 by Hoechst AG, (now AgrEvo GmbH), Rhône-Poulenc and Ciba-Geigy AG. It was once one of the most widely used herbicides in the world, however it has suffered various bans, including the USA, and until 2016 was sold in 22 European countries.

== Regulation ==
IPU is used in India. In 2007, 624 tonnes (1,376,000 lb) was used, 2.6% of India's total herbicide consumption.

=== Australia ===
Isoproturon was never registered in Australia. Agronomist Bill Crabtree estimates potential A$47 billion savings if IPU had been available since 1980. 4Farmers' attempt to register IPU is ongoing.

=== United Kingdom ===
Isoproturon is used in the UK.

Isoproturon was banned in March 2007, taking effect in July 2009, due to its effects on the aquatic environment.

By 2014 the ban was reversed. Lower concentration formulations, notably Blutron, with 250 g/L IPU and 50 g/L diflufenican, were for sale. Greater solubility allows lower concentrations of IPU and greater plant uptake -- lessening the residue left in the environment.

=== European Union ===
Isoproturon's registration in the European Union is expired, though under EC Regulation 1107/2009 it is approved in the Netherlands and no other EU member nation. The EU's ban took effect from the 30th of September 2016.

The EU Commission, that also banned amitrole, did so only partially on endocrine disruption concerns, and other unclear grounds. If it had been for only endocrine disruption, it is likely exemptions would be available (for 'serious danger to plant health' or 'negligible exposure') under EU law. The European Court of Justice ruled in December 2015 that the commission illegally broke their "clear, precise and unconditional obligation" to publish scientific criteria.

=== United States ===
Isoproturon is not registered in the United States. Presumably, it has never been registered.

== Ecodegradation ==
Isoproturon is non-persistent in soil; very photochemically stable, and stable to acids and alkalis, but under sustained ultraviolet light can degrade into some eleven products, and can be hydrolytically cleaved by strong bases on heating.

Degradation is mainly N-demethylation and oxidation of the ring-isopropyl group. Variations in order give rise to a few possible pathways, and the balance of demethylation and oxidation can allow selective activity of the herbicide. Both reactions may occur, making a typical degradation product of 2-(4-Aminophenyl)propan-2-ol (also called Dimethyl-p-Aminobenzylalkohol), which is an irritant and may be harmful if swallowed.

Most isoproturon is expected to have degraded in soil after 6-28 days; the rate is temperature sensitive as the process is driven by enzymes and microbes. In water, the DT_{50} is 40 days, and in water sediments 149 days.

Metabolism in plants usually follows the path beginning with isopropyl side chain oxidation. White-rot fungus has the lignin-degrading enzymes lignin peroxidase and manganese peroxidase which are known to degrade isoproturon in vivo.

== Toxicology ==
Isoproturon is in the WHO's toxicity class III: Slightly Hazardous. The oral LD_{50} is 3350 mg/kg (mice), and percutaneously for rats is >2000 mg/kg. It is non-irritating to skin and eyes, as tested on rabbits. A dietary NOEL over 90 days for rates is 80 mg/kg, for dogs 50 mg/kg. IPU is an endocrine disruptor.

Isoproturon is not toxic to bees and birds but can harm fish, with LC_{50} of 191 mg/L (carp), guppies 91 mg/L, and catfish just 9 mg/L. The UK Environment Agency set a non-statutatory acceptable average water limit of 2 μg/L or 20 μg/L in one measurement. In rats, the half life of ingested isoproturon is about 8 hours, excretion being 86% through urination.

== Application ==
Technical grade isoproturon is >97% pure, and is then sold as an active ingredient in commercial formulations, usually as an SC, suspended concentrate, or WP, wettable powder.

Isoproturon's herbicide resistance class is Group C, (Australia), C2 (global), Group 7, (numeric, i.e. Group 5, due to a merger). It is photosynthesis inhibitor.

=== Synthesis ===
IPU is synthesized from cumene, which is treated with nitric acid (HNO_{3}) to form p-nitrocumene. The nitrite group then is reacted with hydrogen to replace its two oxygen atoms. Phosgene is reacted to p-cumidine, which replaces one of phosgene's chlorine atoms, and then dimethyl amine completes the chain, replacing the other chlorine atom. An alternative route, involving the more direct combination of p-cumidine, urea, and dimethylamine, exists.

== Lists ==
Weeds controlled by IPU include annual grasses, such as black-twitch, common windgrass, common wild oat, and annual meadow grass. It is used in spring and winter to control many annual broad leaved weeds.

Isoproturon is used on crops such as wheat, rye, barley, triticale, sugarcane, citrus, cotton, asparagus, oilseed rape, peas, spring field beans, sugar beet, potatoes, carrots, brassicas and onions. It is not used on durum wheat because of isoproturon's phytotoxicity to it, however it is nonphytotoxic to other cereals.

Isoproturon's herbicide resistance class is class C2 (HRAC) or class 7 (WSSA). Black-twitch and lesser canary grass have shown resistant examples.

== Tradenames ==
- Isoproturon
- Alon (AgrEvo)
- Arelon (AgrEvo)
- Avanon (Gharda)
- Blutron (Agform)
- Isoguard (Gharda)
- Graminon (Ciba-Geigy AG)
- Phytosanitaire (Rhone-Poulenc)
- Tolkan (Rhone-Poulenc)

== Links ==
- Isoproturon in the Pesticide Properties DataBase (PPDB)
