= Photosystem I =

Second protein complex in photosynthetic light reactions

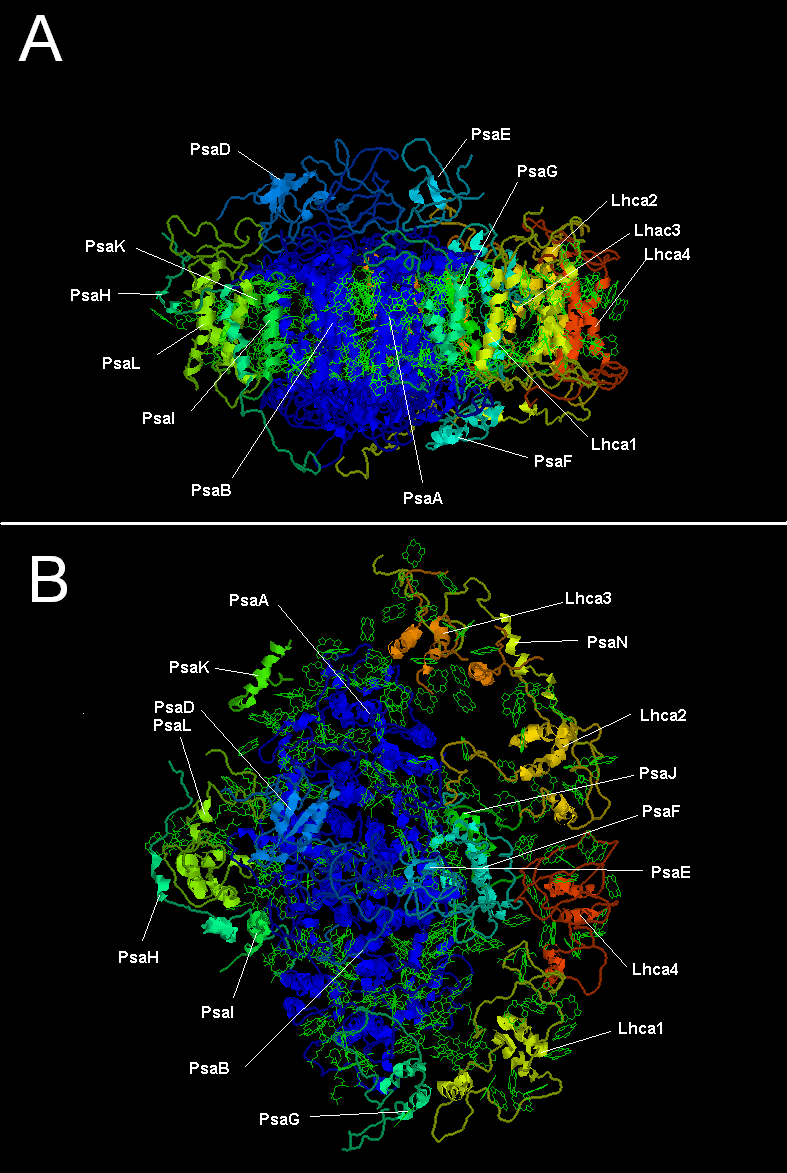
- Plant photosystem I with LHC I

Identifiers
- EC no.: 1.97.1.12

Databases
- BRENDA: enzyme data
- ExPASy: NiceZyme view
- KEGG: enzyme entry
- MetaCyc: metabolic pathway
- Rhea: reactions
- PDB structures: RCSB PDB PDBe PDBsum
Search
- PMC: articles
- PubMed: articles
- NCBI: proteins

Light-dependent reactions of photosynthesis at the thylakoid membrane

Location of the psa genes in the chloroplast genome of Arabidopsis thaliana. The 21 protein-coding genes involved in photosynthesis are displayed as green boxes.

Photosystem I (PSI, or plastocyanin–ferredoxin oxidoreductase) is one of two photosystems in the photosynthetic light reactions of algae, plants, and cyanobacteria. Photosystem I is an integral membrane protein complex that uses light energy to catalyze the transfer of electrons across the thylakoid membrane from plastocyanin to ferredoxin. Ultimately, the electrons that are transferred by Photosystem I are used to produce the moderate-energy hydrogen carrier NADPH. The photon energy absorbed by Photosystem I also produces a proton-motive force that is used to generate ATP. PSI is composed of more than 110 cofactors, significantly more than Photosystem II.

== History ==
This photosystem is known as PSI because it was discovered before Photosystem II, although future experiments showed that Photosystem II is actually the first enzyme of the photosynthetic electron transport chain. Aspects of PSI were discovered in the 1950s, but the significance of these discoveries was not yet recognized at the time. Louis Duysens first proposed the concepts of Photosystems I and II in 1960, and, in the same year, a proposal by Fay Bendall and Robert Hill assembled earlier discoveries into a coherent theory of serial photosynthetic reactions. Hill and Bendall's hypothesis was later confirmed in experiments conducted in 1961 by the Duysens and Witt groups.

== Components and action ==
Two main subunits of PSI, PsaA and PsaB, are closely related proteins involved in the binding of the vital electron transfer cofactors P_{700}, Acc, A_{0}, A_{1}, and F_{x}. PsaA and PsaB are both integral membrane proteins of 730 to 750 amino acids that contain 11 transmembrane segments. A [4Fe-4S] iron-sulfur cluster called F_{x} is coordinated by four cysteines; two cysteines are provided each by PsaA and PsaB. The two cysteines in each are proximal and located in a loop between the ninth and tenth transmembrane segments. A leucine zipper motif seems to be present downstream of the cysteines and could contribute to dimerisation of PsaA/PsaB. The terminal electron acceptors F_{A} and F_{B}, also [4Fe-4S] iron-sulfur clusters, are located in a 9-kDa protein called PsaC that binds to the PsaA/PsaB core near F_{X}.

Components of PSI (protein subunits, lipids, pigments, coenzymes, and cofactors).
Protein subunits	Description
PsaA	Related large transmembrane proteins involved in the binding of P700, A0, A1, and Fx. Part of the photosynthetic reaction centre protein family.
PsaB	Related large transmembrane proteins involved in the binding of P700, A0, A1, and Fx. Part of the photosynthetic reaction centre protein family.
PsaC	Iron-sulfur center; apoprotein for F_{a} and F_{b}
PsaD	Required for assembly, helps bind ferredoxin. InterPro: IPR003685
PsaE	InterPro: IPR003375
PsaI	May stabilize PsaL. Stabilizes light-harvesting complex II binding. InterPro: IPR001302
PsaJ	InterPro: IPR002615
PsaK	InterPro: IPR035982
PsaL	InterPro: IPR036592
PsaM	InterPro: IPR010010
PsaX	InterPro: IPR012986
cytochrome b_{6}f complex	Soluble protein
F_{a}	From PsaC; In electron transport chain (ETC)
F_{b}	From PsaC; In ETC
F_{x}	From PsaAB; In ETC
Ferredoxin	Electron carrier in ETC
Plastocyanin	Soluble protein
Lipids	Description
MGDG II	Monogalactosyldiglyceride lipid
PG I	Phosphatidylglycerol phospholipid
PG III	Phosphatidylglycerol phospholipid
PG IV	Phosphatidylglycerol phospholipid
Pigments	Description
Chlorophyll a	90 pigment molecules in antenna system
Chlorophyll a	5 pigment molecules in ETC
Chlorophyll a_{0}	Early electron acceptor of modified chlorophyll in ETC
Chlorophyll a′	1 pigment molecule in ETC
β-Carotene	22 carotenoid pigment molecules
Coenzymes and cofactors	Description
Q_{K}-A	Early electron acceptor vitamin K_{1} phylloquinone in ETC
Q_{K}-B	Early electron acceptor vitamin K_{1} phylloquinone in ETC
FNR	Ferredoxin-NADP^{+} oxidoreductase enzyme
Ca^{2+}	Calcium ion
Mg^{2+}	Magnesium ion

=== Photon ===
Photoexcitation of the pigment molecules in the antenna complex induces electron and energy transfer.

=== Antenna complex ===
The antenna complex is composed of molecules of chlorophyll and carotenoids mounted on two proteins. These pigment molecules transmit the resonance energy from photons when they become photoexcited. Antenna molecules can absorb all wavelengths of light within the visible spectrum. The number of these pigment molecules varies from organism to organism. For instance, the cyanobacterium Synechococcus elongatus (Thermosynechococcus elongatus) has about 100 chlorophylls and 20 carotenoids, whereas spinach chloroplasts have around 200 chlorophylls and 50 carotenoids. Located within the antenna complex of PSI are molecules of chlorophyll called P700 reaction centers. The energy passed around by antenna molecules is directed to the reaction center. There may be as many as 120 or as few as 25 chlorophyll molecules per P700.

=== P700 reaction center ===
The P700 reaction center is composed of modified chlorophyll a that best absorbs light at a wavelength of 700 nm. P700 receives energy from antenna molecules and uses the energy from each photon to raise an electron to a higher energy level (P700*). These electrons are moved in pairs in an oxidation/reduction process from P700* to electron acceptors, leaving behind P700^{+}. The pair of P700* - P700^{+} has an electric potential of about −1.2 volts. The reaction center is made of two chlorophyll molecules and is therefore referred to as a dimer. The dimer is thought to be composed of one chlorophyll a molecule and one chlorophyll a′ molecule. However, if P700 forms a complex with other antenna molecules, it can no longer be a dimer.

=== Modified chlorophyll A_{0} and A_{1} ===
The two modified chlorophyll molecules are early electron acceptors in PSI. They are present one per PsaA/PsaB side, forming two branches electrons can take to reach F_{x}. A_{0} accepts electrons from P700*, passes it to A_{1} of the same side, which then passes the electron to the quinone on the same side. Different species seems to have different preferences for either A/B branch.

=== Phylloquinone ===
A phylloquinone, sometimes called vitamin K_{1}, is the next early electron acceptor in PSI. It oxidizes A_{1} in order to receive the electron and in turn is re-oxidized by F_{x}, from which the electron is passed to F_{b} and F_{a}. The reduction of F_{x} appears to be the rate-limiting step.

=== Iron–sulfur complex ===
Three proteinaceous iron–sulfur reaction centers are found in PSI. Labeled F_{x}, F_{a}, and F_{b}, they serve as electron relays. F_{a} and F_{b} are bound to protein subunits of the PSI complex and F_{x} is tied to the PSI complex. Various experiments have shown some disparity between theories of iron–sulfur cofactor orientation and operation order. In one model, F_{x} passes an electron to F_{a}, which passes it on to F_{b} to reach the ferredoxin.

=== Ferredoxin ===
Ferredoxin (Fd) is a soluble protein that facilitates reduction of NADP^{+} to NADPH. Fd moves to carry an electron either to a lone thylakoid or to an enzyme that reduces NADP^{+}. Thylakoid membranes have one binding site for each function of Fd. The main function of Fd is to carry an electron from the iron-sulfur complex to the enzyme ferredoxin–NADP^{+} reductase.

=== Ferredoxin–NADP^{+} reductase (FNR) ===
This enzyme transfers the electron from reduced ferredoxin to NADP^{+} to complete the reduction to NADPH. FNR may also accept an electron from NADPH by binding to it.

=== Plastocyanin ===
Plastocyanin is an electron carrier that transfers the electron from cytochrome b6f to the P700 cofactor of PSI in its ionized state P700^{+}.

== Ycf4 protein domain ==
The Ycf4 protein domain found on the thylakoid membrane is vital to photosystem I. This thylakoid transmembrane protein helps assemble the components of photosystem I. Without it, photosynthesis would be inefficient.

== Evolution ==
Molecular data show that PSI likely evolved from the photosystems of green sulfur bacteria. The photosystems of green sulfur bacteria and those of cyanobacteria, algae, and higher plants are not the same, but there are many analogous functions and similar structures. Three main features are similar between the different photosystems. First, redox potential is negative enough to reduce ferredoxin. Next, the electron-accepting reaction centers include iron–sulfur proteins. Last, redox centres in complexes of both photosystems are constructed upon a protein subunit dimer. The photosystem of green sulfur bacteria even contains all of the same cofactors of the electron transport chain in PSI. The number and degree of similarities between the two photosystems strongly indicates that PSI and the analogous photosystem of green sulfur bacteria evolved from a common ancestral photosystem.

== See also ==
- Biohybrid solar cell
