= Propizepine =

Tricyclic antidepressant

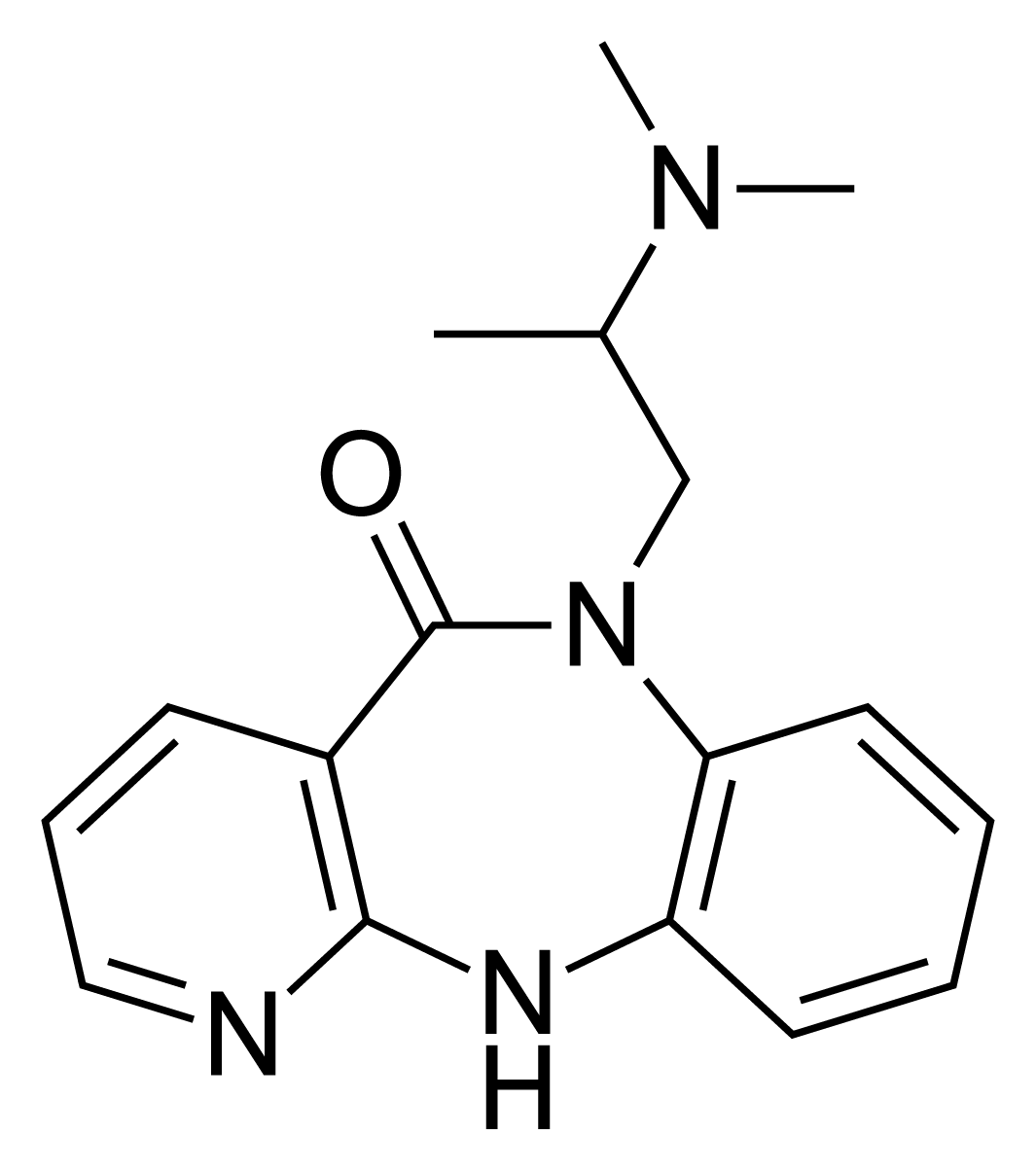

Clinical data
- Trade names: Depressin, Vagran
- Routes of administration: Oral
- ATC code: none

Legal status
- Legal status: In general: ℞ (Prescription only)

Identifiers
- IUPAC name: 6-(2-dimethylaminopropyl)-11H-pyrido[3,2-c][1,5]benzodiazepin-5-one
- CAS Number: 10321-12-7 14559-79-6 (hydrochloride)
- PubChem CID: 112029
- ChemSpider: 100443
- UNII: 09B57945V9
- ChEMBL: ChEMBL2104749
- CompTox Dashboard (EPA): DTXSID20864247
- ECHA InfoCard: 100.030.629

Chemical and physical data
- Formula: C_{17}H_{20}N_{4}O
- Molar mass: 296.374 g·mol^{−1}

Propizepine (brand names Depressin, Vagran) is a tricyclic antidepressant (TCA) used in France for the treatment of depression which was introduced in the 1970s.
