= Photosystem II =

First protein complex in light-dependent reactions of oxygenic photosynthesis

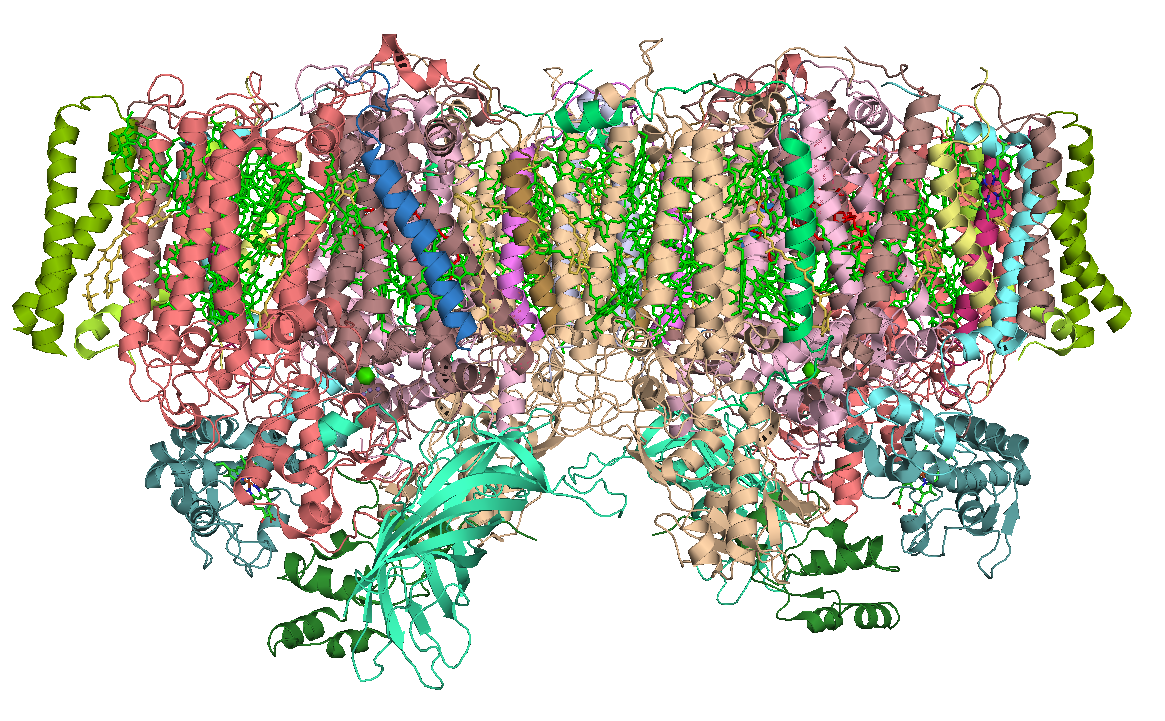
Cyanobacteria photosystem II, Dimer, PDB 2AXT

Photosystem II (or water-plastoquinone oxidoreductase) is the first protein complex in the light-dependent reactions of oxygenic photosynthesis. It is located in the thylakoid membrane of plants, algae, and cyanobacteria. Within the photosystem, enzymes capture photons of light to energize electrons that are then transferred through a variety of coenzymes and cofactors to reduce plastoquinone to plastoquinol. The energized electrons are replaced by oxidizing water to form hydrogen ions and molecular oxygen.

By replenishing lost electrons with electrons from the splitting of water, photosystem II provides the electrons for all oxygenic photosynthesis to occur. The hydrogen ions (protons) generated by the oxidation of water help to create a proton gradient that is used by ATP synthase to generate ATP. The energized electrons transferred to plastoquinone are ultimately used to reduce NADP^{+} to NADPH or are used in non-cyclic electron flow. DCMU is a chemical often used in laboratory settings to inhibit photosynthesis. When present, DCMU inhibits electron flow from photosystem II to plastoquinone.

== Structure of complex ==
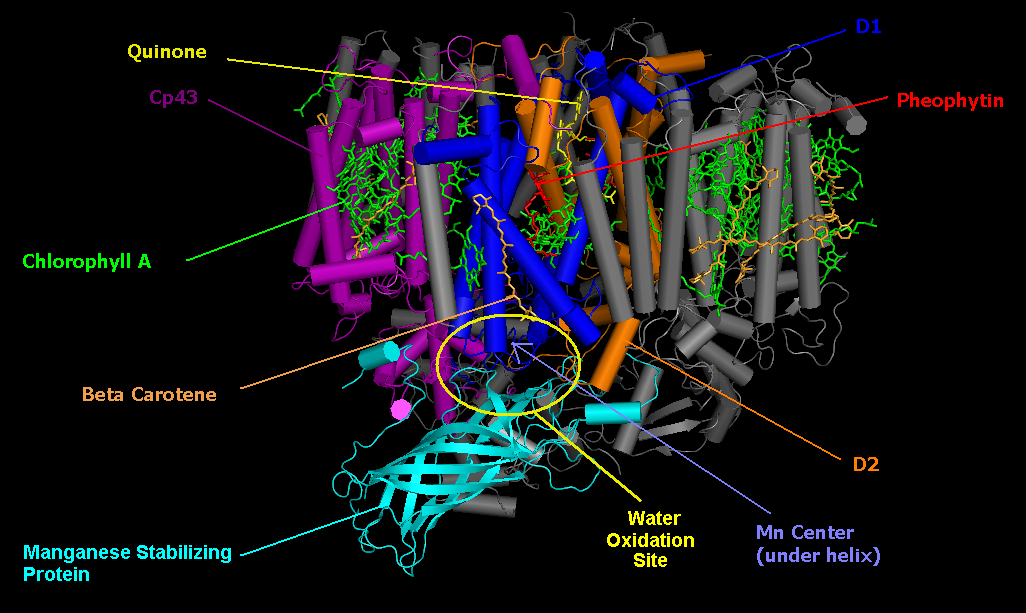
Cyanobacterial photosystem II, Monomer, PDB 2AXT.

Schematic of PSII, highlighting electron transfer.

The core of PSII consists of a pseudo-symmetric heterodimer of two homologous proteins D1 and D2. Unlike the reaction centers of all other photosystems in which the positive charge sitting on the chlorophyll dimer that undergoes the initial photoinduced charge separation is equally shared by the two monomers, in intact PSII the charge is mostly localized on one chlorophyll center (70−80%). Because of this, P680^{+} is highly oxidizing and can take part in the splitting of water.

Photosystem II (of cyanobacteria and green plants) is composed of around 20 subunits (depending on the organism) as well as other accessory, light-harvesting proteins. Each photosystem II contains at least 99 cofactors: 35 chlorophyll a, 12 beta-carotene, two pheophytin, two plastoquinone, two heme, one bicarbonate, 20 lipids, the Mn_{4}CaO_{5} cluster (including two chloride ions), one non heme Fe^{2+} and two putative Ca^{2+} ions per monomer. There are several crystal structures of photosystem II. The PDB accession codes for this protein are 3WU2, 3BZ1, 3BZ2 (3BZ1 and 3BZ2 are monomeric structures of the Photosystem II dimer), 2AXT, 1S5L, 1W5C, 1ILX, 1FE1, 1IZL.

Protein Subunits (only with known function)
Subunit	Family	Function
D1 (PsbA)	Photosynthetic reaction centre protein family	Reaction center protein, binds Chlorophyll P680, pheophytin, beta-carotene, quinone and manganese center
D2 (PsbD)	Photosynthetic reaction centre protein family	Reaction center protein
CP43 (PsbC)	Photosystem II light-harvesting protein	Binds manganese center
CP47 (PsbB)	Photosystem II light-harvesting protein	
O	Manganese-stabilising protein (InterPro: IPR002628)	Manganese Stabilizing Protein
By convention, gene names are formed by Psb + subunit letter. For example, subunit O is PsbO. The exceptions are D1 (PsbA) and D2 (PsbD).

Coenzymes/Cofactors
Cofactor	Function
Chlorophyll	Absorbs light energy and converts it to chemical energy
Beta-carotene	Quench excess photoexcitation energy
Heme B559	Bound to Cytochrome b559 (PsbE–PsbF) as a secondary/protective electron carrier
Pheophytin	Primary electron acceptor
Plastoquinone	Mobile intra-thylakoid membrane electron carrier
Manganese center	Also known as the oxygen evolving center, or OEC

Photosystem II

Identifiers
- EC no.: 1.10.3.9

Databases
- IntEnz: IntEnz view
- BRENDA: BRENDA entry
- ExPASy: NiceZyme view
- KEGG: KEGG entry
- MetaCyc: metabolic pathway
- PRIAM: profile
- PDB structures: RCSB PDB PDBe PDBsum
Search
- PMC: articles
- PubMed: articles
- NCBI: proteins

== Oxygen-evolving complex (OEC) ==
Proposed structure of Manganese Center

The oxygen-evolving complex is the site of water oxidation. It is a metallo-oxo cluster comprising four manganese ions (in oxidation states ranging from +3 to +4) and one divalent calcium ion. When it oxidizes water, producing oxygen gas and protons, it sequentially delivers the four electrons from water to a tyrosine (D1-Y161) sidechain and then to P680 itself. It is composed of three protein subunits, OEE1 (PsbO), OEE2 (PsbP) and OEE3 (PsbQ); a fourth PsbR peptide is associated nearby.

The first structural model of the oxygen-evolving complex was solved using X-ray crystallography from frozen protein crystals with a resolution of 3.8Å in 2001. Over the next years the resolution of the model was gradually increased to 2.9Å. While obtaining these structures was in itself a great feat, they did not show the oxygen-evolving complex in full detail. In 2011 the OEC of PSII was resolved to a level of 1.9Å revealing five oxygen atoms serving as oxo bridges linking the five metal atoms and four water molecules bound to the Mn_{4}CaO_{5} cluster; more than 1,300 water molecules were found in each photosystem II monomer, some forming extensive hydrogen-bonding networks that may serve as channels for protons, water or oxygen molecules. At this stage, it is suggested that the structures obtained by X-ray crystallography are biased, since there is evidence that the manganese atoms are reduced by the high-intensity X-rays used, altering the observed OEC structure. This incentivized researchers to take their crystals to X-ray free electron laser facilities, such as SLAC. In 2014 the structure observed in 2011 was confirmed. Knowing the structure of Photosystem II did not suffice to reveal how it works exactly. So now the race has started to solve the structure of Photosystem II at different stages in the mechanistic cycle (discussed below). Currently structures of the S1 state and the S3 state's have been published almost simultaneously from two different groups, showing the addition of an oxygen molecule designated O6 between Mn1 and Mn4, suggesting that this may be the site on the oxygen evolving complex, where oxygen is produced.

== Water splitting ==
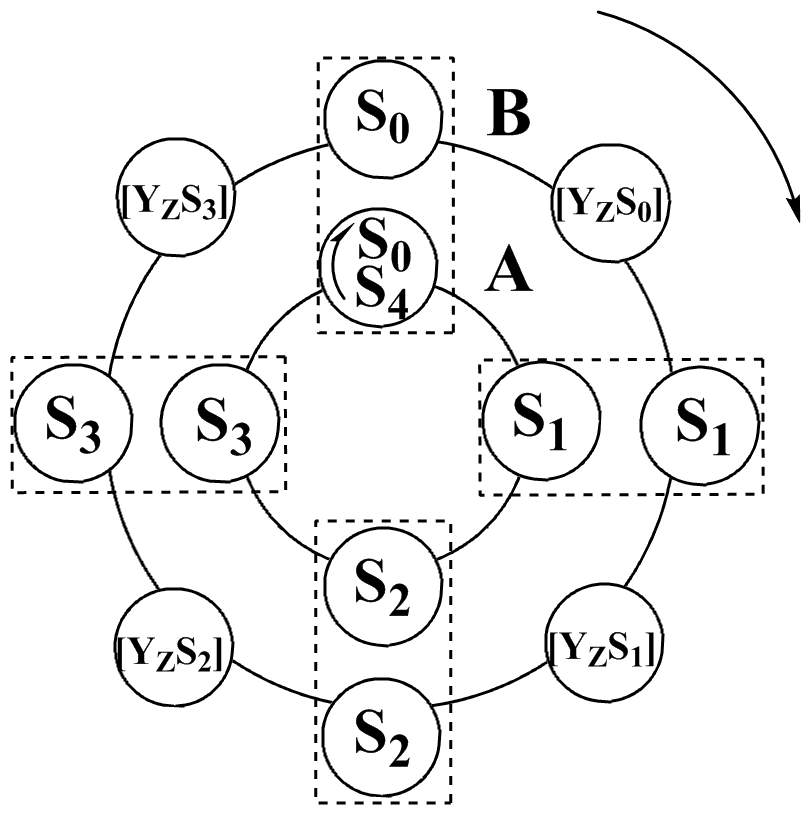
Water-splitting process: Electron transport and regulation. The first level (A) shows the original Kok model of the S-states cycling, the second level (B) shows the link between the electron transport (S-states advancement) and the relaxation process of the intermediate S-states ([YzSn], n=0,1,2,3) formation

Photosynthetic water splitting (or oxygen evolution) is one of the most important reactions on the planet, since it is the source of nearly all the atmosphere's oxygen. Moreover, artificial photosynthetic water-splitting may contribute to the effective use of sunlight as an alternative energy source.

The mechanism of water oxidation is understood in substantial detail. The oxidation of water to molecular oxygen requires extraction of four electrons and four protons from two molecules of water. The experimental evidence that oxygen is released through cyclic reaction of oxygen evolving complex (OEC) within one PSII was provided by Pierre Joliot et al. They have shown that, if dark-adapted photosynthetic material (higher plants, algae, and cyanobacteria) is exposed to a series of single turnover flashes, oxygen evolution is detected with typical period-four damped oscillation with maxima on the third and the seventh flash and with minima on the first and the fifth flash (for review, see). Based on this experiment, Bessel Kok and co-workers introduced a cycle of five flash-induced transitions of the so-called S-states, describing the four redox states of OEC: When four oxidizing equivalents have been stored (at the S_{4}-state), OEC returns to its basic S_{0}-state. In the absence of light, the OEC will "relax" to the S_{1} state; the S_{1} state is often described as being "dark-stable". The S_{1} state is largely considered to consist of manganese ions with oxidation states of Mn^{3+}, Mn^{3+}, Mn^{4+}, Mn^{4+}. Finally, the intermediate S-states were proposed by Jablonsky and Lazar as a regulatory mechanism and link between S-states and tyrosine Z.

In 2012, Renger expressed the idea of internal changes of water molecules into typical oxides in different S-states during water splitting.

== Inhibitors ==
Inhibitors of PSII are used as herbicides. There are two main chemical families, the triazines derived from cyanuric chloride of which atrazine and simazine are the most commonly used and the aryl ureas which include chlortoluron and diuron (DCMU).

== See also ==
- Light-harvesting complex
- Oxygen evolution
- P680
- Photosynthesis
- Photosystem
- Photosystem I
- Photosystem II light-harvesting protein
- Reaction center
- Photoinhibition
