= Diflufenican =

Weed control herbicide

Names
- IUPAC name N-(2,4-difluorophenyl)-2-[3-(trifluoromethyl)phenoxy]pyridine-3-carboxamide
- Other names diflufenicanil; N-(2,4-Difluorophenyl)-2-(3-(trifluoromethyl)phenoxy)nicotinamide

Identifiers
| CAS Number | 83164-33-4 |
| 3D model (JSmol) | Interactive image |
| ChEBI | CHEBI:81824 |
| ChEMBL | ChEMBL1425995 |
| ChemSpider | 82834 |
| ECHA InfoCard | 100.122.360 |
| EC Number | 617-446-2 |
| KEGG | C18549 |
| PubChem CID | 91735 |
| UNII | 3T8D1VDO6K |
| CompTox Dashboard (EPA) | DTXSID4041494 |
- InChI: InChI=1S/C19H11F5N2O2/c20-12-6-7-16(15(21)10-12)26-17(27)14-5-2-8-25-18(14)28-13-4-1-3-11(9-13)19(22,23)24/h1-10H,(H,26,27) Key: WYEHFWKAOXOVJD-UHFFFAOYSA-N
- SMILES: C1=CC(=CC(=C1)OC2=C(C=CC=N2)C(=O)NC3=C(C=C(C=C3)F)F)C(F)(F)F

Properties
| Chemical formula | C_{19}H_{11}F_{5}N_{2}O_{2} |
| Molar mass | 394.301 g·mol^{−1} |
| Appearance | White Powder |
| Density | 1.438 g/cm^{3} |
| Melting point | 160 °C (320 °F; 433 K) |
| Boiling point | 376 °C (709 °F; 649 K) |
| Solubility in water | Insoluble – 0.05mg/L |
| Solubility in acetone | Soluble – 100 g/L |
| Solubility in ethylene glycol | Soluble |
| Solubility in ethanol | Soluble |
| Vapor pressure | 0.07 mPa (30°C) |

Hazards
- GHS labelling
| Pictograms | (GHS09: Environmental hazard) |
| Hazard statements | H411, H413 |
| Precautionary statements | P262, P273, P352, P391 |
| Flash point | 181.3°C, 358.3°F |
- Lethal dose or concentration (LD, LC)
| LD_{50} (median dose) | >5000 mg/kg (rat, oral) |
- Except where otherwise noted, data are given for materials in their standard state (at 25 °C [77 °F], 100 kPa). Infobox references

Diflufenican (sometimes called DFF) is a herbicide used to control weeds including wild radish and wild turnip weeds or suppress capeweed, crassula, marshmallow or shepherd's purse, in clover pasture, lupins, lentils or field peas.

== Discovery ==
Diflufenican was discovered with a common intermediate method (CIM), and trialled in England and France between 1981 and 1983. A simple intermediate is reacted and recombined. Diflufenican derives from 2-chloronicotinic acid, one product replaced the chlorine with a phenoxy group, one receives an aniline group, and then both are recombined into DFF.

== Toxicology ==
The Australian Acceptable Daily Intake for diflufenican is set at 0.2 mg/kg/day, based on the NOEL of 16.3 mg/kg/day. With an oral rat LD_{50} of >5000 mg/kg, diflufenican is not toxic to mammals, nor to honeybees.

By inhalation, the air LC_{50} is 2.34 mg/L, for rats. It is not irritating to the skin and eyes, tested on rabbits. In dogs over 90 days, a NOEL of 1000 mg/kg daily was found. By the Ames Test, it is non-mutagenic.

To birds, diflufenican is not toxic. LD_{50} of >2150 mg/kg (quail), >4000 mg/kg (mallard ducks). For fish, the LC_{50} is 56–100 mg/L (rainbow trout), 105 mg/L (carp). DFF does not inhibit the growth of algae. Non-toxic to earthworms.

== Environmental fate ==
Diflufenican has high persistence in soil but has low mobility, and low bioaccumulative potential. It is toxic to aquatic life. (See toxicology section for details).

Diflufenican rapidly metabolises in cereals to carbon dioxide via nicotinamide and nicotinic acid, and leaves no detectable residue after 200–250 days. In soil, similar degradation to CO_{2} is seen, with a half life of 15 to 30 weeks.

== Effect and mechanism ==
Targeted weeds display bleaching and chlorotic spotting, followed by pink and purple foliage and necrosis. Symptoms typically begin 3–4 days after application. DFF's residual activity may last 8 weeks.

Diflufenican inhibits carotenoid synthesis, without which photosynthesis begins to fail and the plant is vulnerable to damage from sunlight, causing growth cessation and necrosis. It is absorbed by germinating seedlings. Usually applied at 125–250 g/ha preëmergently or shortly after, often with other cereal herbicides.

Diflufenican is a Group F, (Australia), F1 (global) or Group 12 (numeric) resistance class herbicide.

Diflufenican is an indicator of soil trace element deficiencies; it induces deficiency symptoms in crops.

== Regulations ==
It has seen use in Australia, and Europe, and North America for use on soybean and corn.

Diflufenican is registered in the United Kingdom and the European Union, for professional and amateur use. It is also approved in New Zealand. Canada's PMRA registered it in Feb 2024, and the U.S. EPA in June 2026.

Pesticide products containing diflufenican have been banned in Denmark because the chemical can degrade into trifluoroacetic acid, which can then contaminate groundwater.

== Applications ==
Diflufenican is often applied at 50–100 g/ha, or lower if part of a herbicide mixture, e.g. as little as 9 g/ha with bromoxynil.

376 tonnes of diflufenican active ingredient were used in the United Kingdom in 2020.

=== List of targeted weeds ===
Diflufenican has shown control over: wild radish, wild turnip, turnip weed, multiply herbicide resistant waterhemp (applied preëmergently), hedge mustard, Indian hedge mustard, charlock, deadnettle, prickly lettuce, pheasant's eye, Galium aparine, ivy-leaved speedwell and Veronica persica; and suppression of capeweed, crassula, night-scented stock, marshmallow, corn gromwell, chickweed, hyssop loosestrife, Skeleton weed, speedwell, amsinckia, Paterson's curse, rough poppy, sorrel, toad rush, stinging nettle and shepherd's purse.

=== List of co-used pesticides ===
Diflufenican has been sold in formulations containing (not limited to): isoproturon, ioxynil, mecoprop, bromoxynil, diclofop-methyl, and pendimethalin. Furthermore, compatibility is reported with: simazine, alpha cypermethrin, metribuzin and quizalofop, in addition to compatibility with most grass herbicides.

=== List of crops applied to ===
Diflufenican has been applied to crops, including: wheat, barley, field peas, lentils, lupins and oilseed poppy.

== Tradenames ==
- Diflufenican
- DFF
- Brodal
