= Plastoquinone =

Molecule which moves electron in photosynthesis

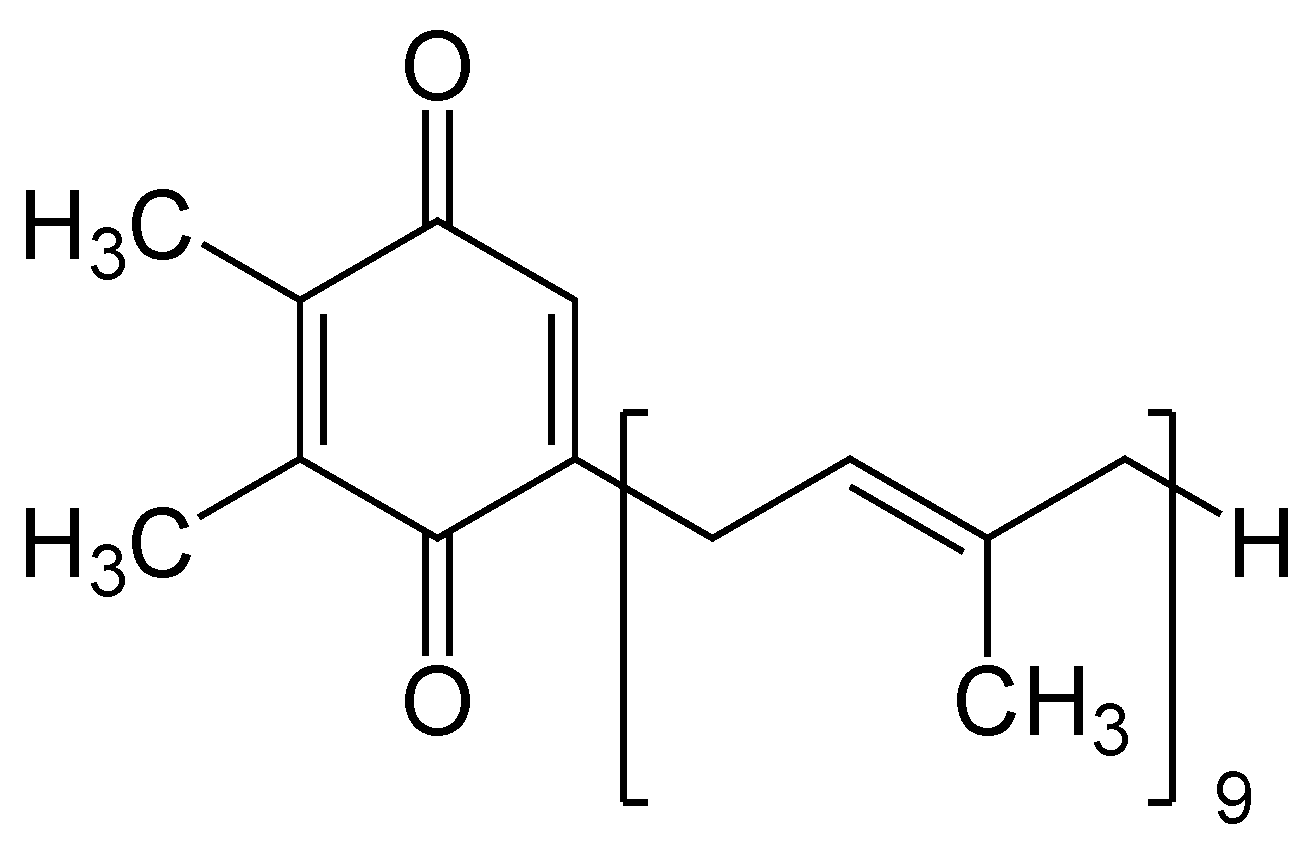

Names
- Preferred IUPAC name 2,3-Dimethyl-5-[(2E,6'E,10E,14E,18E,22E,26E,30E)-3,7,11,15,19,23,27,31,35-nonamethylhexatriaconta-2,6,10,14,18,22,26,30,34-nonaen-1-yl]cyclohexa-2,5-diene-1,4-dione

Identifiers
CAS Number	4299-57-4
3D model (JSmol)	Interactive image
ChemSpider	10627857
PubChem CID	6433402
UNII	OAC30J69CN
CompTox Dashboard (EPA)	DTXSID40893791
- InChI: InChI=1S/C53H80O2/c1-40(2)21-13-22-41(3)23-14-24-42(4)25-15-26-43(5)27-16-28-44(6)29-17-30-45(7)31-18-32-46(8)33-19-34-47(9)35-20-36-48(10)37-38-51-39-52(54)49(11)50(12)53(51)55/h21,23,25,27,29,31,33,35,37,39H,13-20,22,24,26,28,30,32,34,36,38H2,1-12H3/b41-23+,42-25+,43-27+,44-29+,45-31+,46-33+,47-35+,48-37- Key: FKUYMLZIRPABFK-RLAZMVNUSA-N
- SMILES: CC=1C(=O)/C=C(/C\C=C(\C)CC\C=C(/C)CC\C=C(/C)CC\C=C(/C)CC\C=C(/C)CC\C=C(/C)CC\C=C(/C)CC\C=C(/C)CC\C=C(/C)C)C(=O)C=1C

Properties
Chemical formula	C_{53}H_{80}O_{2}
Molar mass	749.221 g·mol^{−1}

Related compounds
Related compounds	1,4-benzoquinone quinone coenzyme Q10
- Except where otherwise noted, data are given for materials in their standard state (at 25 °C [77 °F], 100 kPa). verify (what is ?) Infobox references

Plastoquinone (PQ) is a terpenoid-quinone (meroterpenoid) molecule involved in the electron transport chain in the light-dependent reactions of photosynthesis. The most common form of plastoquinone, known as PQ-A or PQ-9, is a 2,3-dimethyl-1,4-benzoquinone molecule with a side chain of nine isoprenyl units. There are other forms of plastoquinone, such as ones with shorter side chains like PQ-3 (which has 3 isoprenyl side units instead of 9) as well as analogs such as PQ-B, PQ-C, and PQ-D, which differ in their side chains. The benzoquinone and isoprenyl units are both nonpolar, anchoring the molecule within the inner section of a lipid bilayer, where the hydrophobic tails are usually found.

Plastoquinones are very structurally similar to ubiquinone, or coenzyme Q10, differing by the length of the isoprenyl side chain, replacement of the methoxy groups with methyl groups, and removal of the methyl group in the 2 position on the quinone. Like ubiquinone, it can come in several oxidation states: plastoquinone, plastosemiquinone (unstable), and plastoquinol, which differs from plastoquinone by having two hydroxyl groups instead of two carbonyl groups.

Plastoquinol, the reduced form, also functions as an antioxidant by reducing reactive oxygen species, some produced from the photosynthetic reactions, that could harm the cell membrane. One example of how it does this is by reacting with superoxides to form hydrogen peroxide and plastosemiquinone.

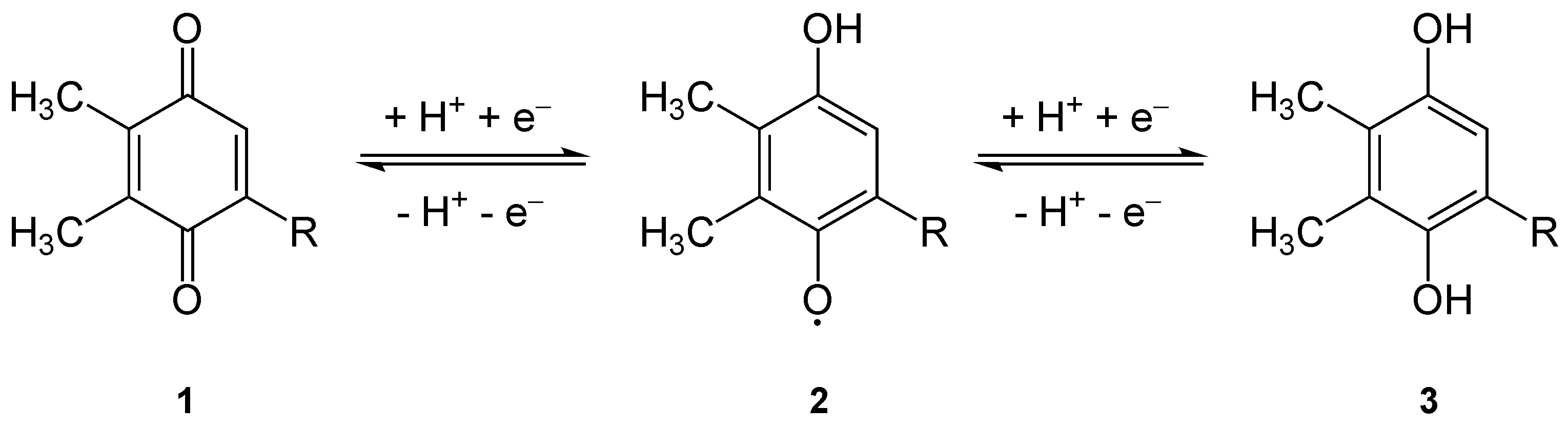
The reduction (from left to right) of plastoquinone (PQ) to plastosemiquinone (PQH^{.}) to plastoquinol (PQH_{2}).

The prefix plasto- means either plastid or chloroplast, alluding to its location within the cell.

== Role in photosynthesis ==
The structure of photosystem II is shown above, with the flow of electrons detailed by the red arrows. Plastoquinone binding sites Q_{A} and Q_{B} are included in this flow of electrons, with plastoquinol leaving Q_{B} to participate in the next step of the light-dependent reactions.

The role that plastoquinone plays in photosynthesis, more specifically in the light-dependent reactions of photosynthesis, is that of a mobile electron carrier through the membrane of the thylakoid.

Plastoquinone is reduced when it accepts two electrons from photosystem II and two hydrogen cations (H^{+}) from the stroma of the chloroplast, thereby forming plastoquinol (PQH_{2}). It transfers the electrons further down the electron transport chain to plastocyanin, a mobile, water-soluble electron carrier, through the cytochrome b_{6}f protein complex. The cytochrome b_{6}f protein complex catalyzes the electron transfer between plastoquinone and plastocyanin, but also transports the two protons into the lumen of thylakoid discs. This proton transfer forms an electrochemical gradient, which is used by ATP synthase at the end of the light dependent reactions in order to form ATP from ADP and P_{i}.

=== Within photosystem II ===
Plastoquinone is found within photosystem II in two specific binding sites, known as Q_{A} and Q_{B}. The plastoquinone at Q_{A}, the primary binding site, is very tightly bound, compared to the plastoquinone at Q_{B}, the secondary binding site, which is much more easily removed. Q_{A} only transfers a single electron, so it has to transfer an electron to Q_{B} twice before Q_{B} is able to pick up two protons from the stroma and be replaced by another plastoquinone molecule. The protonated Q_{B} then joins a pool of free plastoquinone molecules in the membrane of the thylakoid. The free plastoquinone molecules eventually transfer electrons to the water-soluble plastocyanin so as to continue the light-dependent reactions. There are additional plastoquinone binding sites within photosystem II (Q_{C} and possibly Q_{D}), but their function and/or existence have not been fully elucidated.

== Biosynthesis ==
The p-hydroxyphenylpyruvate is synthesized from tyrosine, while the solanesyl diphosphate is synthesized through the MEP/DOXP pathway. Homogentisate is formed from p-hydroxyphenylpyruvate and is then combined with solanesyl diphosphate through a condensation reaction. The resulting intermediate, 2-methyl-6-solanesyl-1,4-benzoquinol is then methylated to form the final product, plastoquinol-9. This pathway is used in most photosynthetic organisms, like algae and plants. However, cyanobacteria appear to not use homogentisate for synthesizing plastoquinol, possibly resulting in a pathway different from the one shown below.

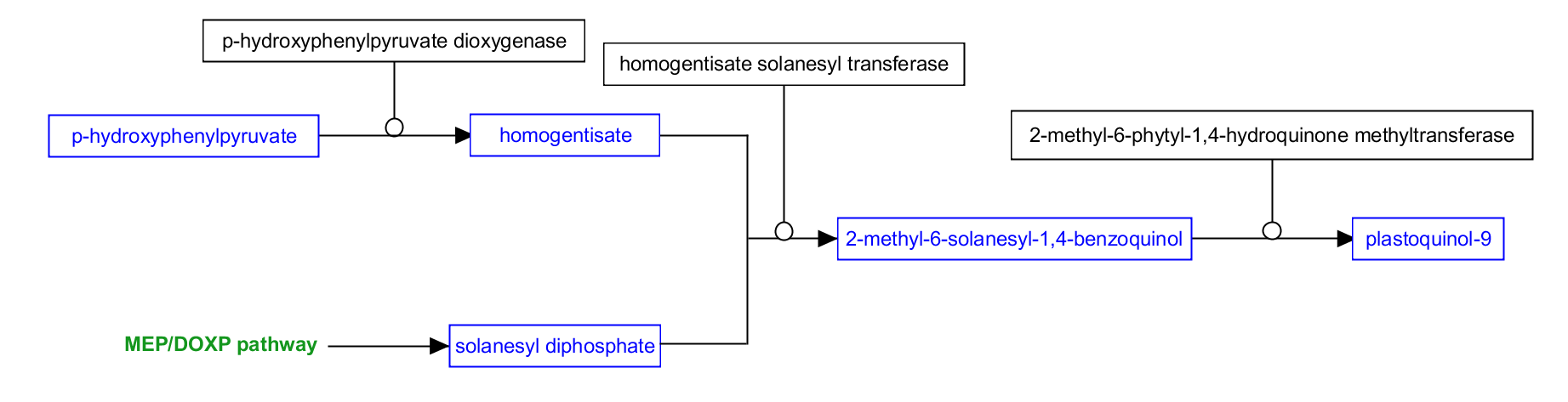
Biosynthesis pathway of PQ-9 with intermediates in blue, enzymes in black, and additional pathways in green.

== Derivatives ==
Some derivatives that were designed to penetrate mitochondrial cell membranes (SkQ1 (plastoquinonyl-decyl-triphenylphosphonium), SkQR1 (the rhodamine-containing analog of SkQ1), SkQ3) have anti-oxidant and protonophore activity. SkQ1 has been proposed as an anti-aging treatment, with the possible reduction of age-related vision issues due to its antioxidant ability. This antioxidant ability results from both its antioxidant ability to reduce reactive oxygen species (derived from the part of the molecule containing plastoquinonol), which are often formed within mitochondria, as well as its ability to increase ion exchange across membranes (derived from the part of the molecule containing cations that can dissolve within membranes). Specifically, like plastoquinol, SkQ1 has been shown to scavenge superoxides both within cells (in vivo) and outside of cells (in vitro). SkQR1 and SkQ1 have also been proposed as a possible way to treat brain issues like Alzheimer's due to their ability to potentially fix damages caused by amyloid beta. Additionally, SkQR1 has been shown as a way to reduce the issues caused by brain trauma through its antioxidant abilities, which help prevent cell death signals by reducing the amounts of reactive oxygen species coming from mitochondria.
