= Oxygen evolution =

Generation of molecular oxygen through a biochemical or chemical reaction

Oxygen evolution is the chemical process of generating diatomic oxygen (O_{2}) by a chemical reaction, usually from water, the most abundant oxide compound in the universe. Oxygen evolution on Earth is effected by biotic oxygenic photosynthesis, photodissociation, hydroelectrolysis, and thermal decomposition of various oxides and oxyacids. When relatively pure oxygen is required industrially, it is isolated by distilling liquefied air.

Natural oxygen evolution is essential to the biological process of all complex life on Earth, as aerobic respiration has become the most important biochemical process of eukaryotic thermodynamics since eukaryotes evolved through symbiogenesis during the Proterozoic eon, and such consumption can only continue if oxygen is cyclically replenished by photosynthesis. The various oxygenation events during Earth's history had not only influenced changes in Earth's biosphere, but also significantly altered the atmospheric chemistry. The transition of Earth's atmosphere from an anoxic prebiotic reducing atmosphere high in methane and hydrogen sulfide to an oxidative atmosphere of which free nitrogen and oxygen make up 99% of the mole fractions, had led to major climate changes and caused numerous icehouse phenomena and global glaciations.

In industries, oxygen evolution reaction (OER) is a limiting factor in the process of generating molecular oxygen through chemical reactions such as water splitting and electrolysis, and improved OER electrocatalysis is the key to the advancement of a number of renewable energy technologies such as solar fuels, regenerative fuel cells and metal–air batteries.

== Oxygen evolution in nature ==
Photosynthetic oxygen evolution is the fundamental process by which oxygen is generated in the earth's biosphere. The reaction is part of the light-dependent reactions of photosynthesis in cyanobacteria and the chloroplasts of green algae and plants. It utilizes the energy of light to split a water molecule into its protons and electrons for photosynthesis. Free oxygen, generated as a by-product of this reaction, is released into the atmosphere.

Water oxidation is catalyzed by a manganese-containing cofactor contained in photosystem II, known as the oxygen-evolving complex (OEC) or the water-splitting complex. Manganese is an important cofactor, and calcium and chloride are also required for the reaction to occur. The stoichiometry of this reaction is as follows:

2H_{2}O ⟶ 4e^{−} + 4H^{+} + O_{2}

The protons are released into the thylakoid lumen, thus contributing to the generation of a proton gradient across the thylakoid membrane. This proton gradient is the driving force for adenosine triphosphate (ATP) synthesis via photophosphorylation and the coupling of the absorption of light energy and the oxidation of water for the creation of chemical energy during photosynthesis.

=== History of discovery ===
It was not until the end of the 18th century that Joseph Priestley accidentally discovered the ability of plants to "restore" air that had been "injured" by the burning of a candle. He followed up on the experiment by showing that air "restored" by vegetation was "not at all inconvenient to a mouse." He was later awarded a medal for his discoveries that "...no vegetable grows in vain... but cleanses and purifies our atmosphere." Priestley's experiments were further evaluated by Jan Ingenhousz, a Dutch physician, who then showed that the "restoration" of air only worked while in the presence of light and green plant parts.

== Water electrolysis ==
Together with hydrogen (H_{2}), oxygen is evolved by the electrolysis of water. The point of water electrolysis is to store energy in the form of hydrogen gas, a clean-burning fuel. The "oxygen evolution reaction (OER) is the major bottleneck [to water electrolysis] due to the sluggish kinetics of this four-electron transfer reaction." All practical catalysts are heterogeneous.

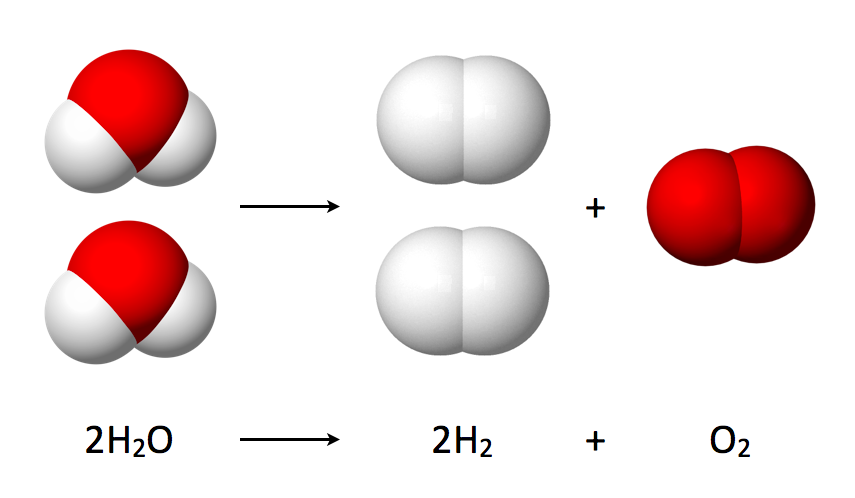
Diagram showing the overall chemical equation.

Electrons (e^{−}) are transferred from the cathode to protons to form hydrogen gas. The half reaction, balanced with acid, is:

2 H^{+} + 2e^{−} → H_{2}

At the positively charged anode, an oxidation reaction occurs, generating oxygen gas and releasing electrons to the anode to complete the circuit:

2 H_{2}O → O_{2} + 4 H^{+} + 4e^{−}

Combining either half reaction pair yields the same overall decomposition of water into oxygen and hydrogen:

Overall reaction:
2 H_{2}O → 2 H_{2} + O_{2}

== Chemical oxygen generation ==
Although some metal oxides eventually release O_{2} when heated, these conversions generally require high temperatures. A few compounds release O_{2} at mild temperatures. Chemical oxygen generators consist of chemical compounds that release O_{2} when stimulated, usually by heat. They are used in submarines and commercial aircraft to provide emergency oxygen. Oxygen is generated by the high-temperature decomposition of sodium chlorate:

2 NaClO_{3} → 2 NaCl + 3 O_{2}

Potassium permanganate also releases oxygen upon heating, but the yield is modest:

2 KMnO_{4} → MnO_{2} + K_{2}MnO_{4} + O_{2}

== See also ==
- Geological history of oxygen
  - Great Oxygenation Event
  - Neoproterozoic oxygenation event
  - Silurian-Devonian Terrestrial Revolution
- Oxygen cycle
