= Rhodomicrobium vannielii =

Scientific classification
- Domain: Bacteria
- Kingdom: Pseudomonadati
- Phylum: Pseudomonadota
- Class: Alphaproteobacteria
- Order: Hyphomicrobiales
- Family: Hyphomicrobiaceae
- Genus: Rhodomicrobium
- Species: R. vannielii

Binomial name
- Rhodomicrobium vannielii Duchow and Douglas 1949

Type strain
- ATCC 17100, ATH 3.1.1, BCRC 16411, CCRC 16411, DSM 162, E. Y. 33, HMSATH3.1.1, LMG 4299, NCIB 10020, NCIMB 10020, van Niel ATH.3.1.1.

Species of bacterium

Rhodomicrobium vannielii is a Gram-negative, purple non-sulfur, motile, thermophilic photoheterotroph bacterium. Phototrophic bacteria are ubiquitous and have been reportedly found in many marine and terrestrial ecosystems. Additionally, they can use light as an energy source and carbon dioxide as a carbon source. Considering this, R. vannielii is thought to have potential application in anaerobic treatment and bioremediation under high temperature conditions as the bacteria was isolated from water samples from a hot spring in Gadek, Malacca, Malaysia using glutamate-malate medium (GMM) and Pfennig's M2 medium. R. vannielii produces acyclic and aliphatic cyclic carotenoids like anhydrorhodovibrin, rhodovibrin, spirilloxanthin and rhodopin.

== Microbiologic characteristics ==
=== Morphology ===
Mature R. vannielii cells are typically ovoid to spherical in shape, do not form intracellular sulfur globules, and are about 2.0-2.5 μm long and 1.2-1.5 μm wide. The cells are then attached by means of slender branched filaments, with the connecting filaments varying in length, but a uniform diameter of approximately 0.3 microns. Colonies are irregular in shape, and have a rough, convoluted surface. After observation, the cells showed a budding filament formation. R. vannielli is unique as it is the only species of its genus to reproduce via budding rather than fission.

=== Pigmentation ===
Rhodomicrobium vannielii contains carotenoid pigments, which gives its cultures a salmon-pink to a deep orange-red color, depending on the density of growth. The dominant photosynthetic pigment is bacteriochlorophylla and carotenoids of rhodopsin and lycopene. Optimum carotenoid production was achieved after the culture spent 24 hours in GMM without yeast-extract and having been incubated in anaerobic-light condition at a light intensity of 2000 lux. R. vannielii’s growth rate was measured as optical density at a wavelength of 660 nm.

=== Metabolism ===
Rhodomicrobium vannielii is an anoxygenic bacteria, meaning it uses light as an energy source and converts it into ATP without the production of oxygen as a byproduct of the reaction. R. vannielii grows better in anaerobic-light conditions compared to growth in aerobic-dark. This growth shows that cells are capable of also growing chemoheterophically in the dark, meaning it can derive its energy from chemical energy sources as well as from sunlight. However, the microbe cannot use carbon dioxide as its sole carbon source, but requires other compounds from the environment to meet their carbon requirements. R. vannielii is able to utilize acetate, lactate, pyruvate, citrate and succinate as a carbon source. However, cell growth and carotenoid production is highest when succinate or acetate is used as substrate after 48-hours of incubation.

== Environment ==
Water samples were first isolated from Gadek Hot Spring in Malacca, Malaysia, at a depth of 0.8-1.4 m from the water surface using an extendable metal sampler. The water samples were isolated on two media: (i) glutamate-malate medium (GMM), and (ii) Pfennig’s M2 medium. All inoculated bottles were incubated using 60 W (Morries) tungsten lamps at 2000 lux light intensity of continuous illumination with a temperature ranging between 38-40 °C. After 7 days of incubation, the GMM media changed color from transparent yellow to red. Growth in the M2 medium, however, was slower as pink to light red color appeared after more than 10 days incubation. It was found that R. vannielii’s temperature optima was approximately 50 °C to 58 °C, while its pH optima ranged from 6.8 to 7.3. The microorganism’s optimum light intensity for carotenoid production was 2000 lux.

== Phenotypic and genetic characteristics ==
On average, R. vannielii’s genome size is approximately 400 base pairs, is motile, stains Gram-negative, and has a G+C content of 62.2%.

In 1949, it was debated on whether R. vannielii was to be placed in the genus Rhodospirillum or Rhodopseudomonas because the photoheterotrophs were all closely related morphologically. However, subsequent studies of the physiology and morphology of several pure R. vannielii cultures have led researchers to create a new genus for this organism: Rhodomicrobium. This name was chosen to honor Professor C. B. van Niel as his studies of R. vannielii heavily contributed to what is currently known regarding the group of microorganisms.
