= Kliti Grice =

Australian scientist

Professor Kliti Grice FAA FRACI

Personal details
- Occupation: Chemist, geochemist

Kliti Grice is an Australian chemist and geochemist known for her work in identifying geological and environmental causes for mass extinction events. Her research integrates geological information with data on molecular fossils and their stable carbon, hydrogen and sulfur isotopic compositions to reconstruct details of microbial, fungal and floral inhabitants of modern and ancient aquatic environments and biodiversity hot spots. This information expands our understanding of both the Earth's history and its current physical state, with implications ranging from energy and mineral resource exploration strategies to environmental sustainability encompassing climate dynamics and expected rates, durations and scale of our future planet's health. As one of the youngest women professors in Earth Sciences, she is the founding director of the Western Australian Organic and Isotope Geochemistry Centre (WA-OIGC) and is a Professor of Organic and Isotope Geochemistry at Curtin University in Perth, Western Australia.

== Early life and education ==
Kliti Grice obtained her PhD in 1995 at the University of Bristol (UK). Grice's PhD research measured and interpreted the stable carbon isotopic compositions of maleimides (small, polar, nitrogen-containing molecules) in sedimentary organic matter from the Permian Kupferschiefer (highly anoxic Zechstein Sea, NW Germany). These compounds are unique to the chlorophylls of photosynthetic algae and bacteriochlorophylls of anoxygenic photosynthetic green sulfur bacteria (Chlorobi) – a discovery that has underpinned some of her latter breakthroughs.

From November 1995 to February 1998, Kliti undertook a post-doctoral fellowship (100% research) at the Royal Netherlands Institute for Sea Research under the guidance of Jaap Sinninghe Damsté (Member of the Royal Netherlands Academy of Arts and Sciences; and Spinoza Prize winner - The Netherlands' highest science research award).

During her postgraduate research, Kliti was mentored by Professor James R Maxwell (FRS; former co-editor-in-chief of Organic Geochemistry) and the late Prof. Geoffrey Eglinton (FRS; recipient of the Royal medal, Dan David Prize and NASA gold medal). Other important career mentors include: Roger Summons (MIT, USA; formerly Chief Researcher at Geoscience Australia), FRS, FAA, Fellow American Geophysical Union; the late Prof. John de Laeter (legacy includes John de Laeter Centre-JDLC at CU); and Roland de Marco (Deputy VC Research at University of the Sunshine Coast, Queensland; formerly Head of Department of Chemistry and Dean of Research at CU).

== Career and impact ==
Grice is renowned for addressing critical palaeobiological questions using innovative analytical approaches. Her investigations into ancient environments and their contemporary analogues have led to improved understanding of Phanerozoic ecosystems, the physiology of plants and algae, and petroleum and mineral geochemistry. Of particular importance was pinpointing sulfide toxicity as an underlying cause of rapid biological turnover, by identifying the frequency of green sulfur bacteria (GSB) remains in mass extinction sedimentary records. More recently, she identified the key role of microbial communities in exceptional fossil preservation, with increased access and utilization of this new biological fossil record. Major scientific breakthroughs have shed light on global anoxic events and their association with mass extinctions. Grice's PhD research on the stable carbon isotopic compositions of maleimides in sedimentary organic matter from the Permian Kupferschiefer underpinned some of her latter breakthroughs (e.g., relationship between GSB, sulfide toxicity and highly dynamic environmental/biological systems). Chlorobi utilise H_{2}S during photosynthesis to fix CO_{2}, giving a 13C enrichment of lipids that renders them distinct from the lipids of other algae [84, 86]. She has additionally discovered an array of diagenetic products from the carotenoids made by Chlorobi.

At Curtin University Grice has built the Western Australian Organic & Isotope Geochemistry Centre (WA-OIGC) into one of the largest organic geochemical laboratories in the southern hemisphere, with research infrastructure primarily funded by 15 ARC infrastructure grants. This includes four compound specific isotope and bulk isotope analysis facilities (C, H, N and S) available for organic analytes and a 2018 ARC grant ($1.276M) for a Time-of-Flight Secondary Ion Mass Spectrometer (TOF-SIMS). Other analytical instrumentation in the WA-OIGC laboratories include gas chromatography-mass spectrometry (GC-MS) equipped with a range of sample introduction methods (liquid injection, SPME, gas analysis, on-line pyrolysis devices, thermal desorption unit) and two-dimensional GC (GC×GC-TOFMS) for complex organic mixtures. Heavy polar molecules, such as intact lipids and metalloporphyrins, are analysed by Orbitrap liquid chromatography-mass spectrometry (LC-MS).

Grice collaborated with colleagues at UWA (Malcolm McCulloch FAA, FRS and Paul Greenwood) to build the world's second dedicated sulfur-CSIA facility (GC-ICPMS), which measures δ34S of organosulfur compounds. WA-OIGC now also includes a state-of-the-art paleogenomics laboratory, established by Deputy Director Marco Coolen in 2015, capable of nucleic acid extraction from trace biomass of ancient environments. The excellent ancillary facilities at WA-OIGC include core drilling equipment, sample preparation and storage, traditional wet chemistry methods for extraction, chemical cleavage, separation and derivatisation, and more novel techniques including hydropyrolysis for soft thermal fragmentation of macromolecules. The WA-OIGC facilities have led to many national and international partnerships with universities, government and industry.

WA-OIGC is also a major member of the JDLC, a collaborative research venture hosting over $30M worth of excellent analytical and mass spectrometry infrastructure. The JDLC provides access to a range of world-class imaging techniques, including Focused Ion Beam–Scanning Electron Microscopy (FIB-SEM) and an atom probe. The CSIRO Mineral Resources and Petroleum Division, located adjacent to Curtin, has an Advanced Characterisation Facility supporting detailed micro-characterisation of geological samples. MoU arrangements allow CU staff access to this state-of-the-art infrastructure which includes world-class optical microscopy, automated mineralogy, XRD and microbeam XRF mapping, X-ray computer tomography microscopy and a nuclear microprobe. Grice was appointed as a senior research fellow at Curtin University in 1998 and became Professor of Organic and Isotope Geochemistry in 2007. She was awarded the J G Russell Award by the Australian Academy of Science for her research on stable carbon and hydrogen isotope signatures of chemical fossils.

Grice is a member of the Australian National Committee of Earth Sciences (NCES).

Her research has shown that some major biological extinction events can be traced to factors intrinsic to the Earth's systems, rather than external factors such as asteroid impacts.

== Awards and honours ==
- 2001: International Pieter Schenck Award for Outstanding Contributions in Organic Geochemistry
- 2002: The Premier's Inaugural Science Award for Early Career Achievement in Science, Western Australia
- 2014: Australian Organic Geochemistry (AOGC) Medal
- 2016: Gibb Maitland Medal from the Australian Geological Society for Outstanding Contributions to the Resources sector WA
- 2017: Morrison Medal, The Australian and New Zealand Society for Mass Spectrometry
- 2018: ANZAAS Medal
- 2018: Fellow of the Australian Academy of Science (FAA)
- 2021: Australian Laureate Fellowship
