= Chlorobium chlorochromatii =

Scientific classification
- Domain: Bacteria
- Kingdom: Pseudomonadati
- Phylum: Chlorobiota
- Class: Chlorobiia
- Order: Chlorobiales
- Family: Chlorobiaceae
- Genus: Chlorobium
- Species: C. chlorochromatii

Binomial name
- Chlorobium chlorochromatii Vogl et al. 2006

Species of bacterium

Chlorobium chlorochromatii, previously included in Chlorobium aggregatum, is a symbiotic green sulfur bacteria that performs anoxygenic photosynthesis and functions as an obligate photoautotroph using reduced sulfur species as electron donors. Chlorobium chlorochromatii can be found in stratified freshwater lakes.

== Topic morphology ==
Chlorobium chlorochromatii is a Gram-negative, non-motile bacillus, that exists in short chains. The cells are green and contain a ring of chlorosomes around lining the inside of their cell wall. These chlorosomes contain light harvesting pigments bacteriochlorophyll a and bacteriochlorophyll c, which transfer electrons into Photosystem 1.

== Ecology ==
Photosynthetic green sulfur bacteria such as Chlorobium chlorochromatii reside in freshwater, stratified lakes and are found below micro-aerophilic algal layer in anaerobic, light-exposed environments. They are found worldwide, mostly in holomictic or meromictic stratified lakes. Such environments have been reported in Germany, Tasmania, the USA, ice-covered lakes in Antarctica, Israel, and Japan. Chlorobium chlorochromatii prefer environments with low temperature and low sulfur concentrations.

=== Symbiosis ===
Chlorobium chlorochromatii, strain CaD, was originally isolated from the phototrophic microbial consortium Chlorochromatium aggregatum. The ability of this epibiont to grow in pure culture indicates that it is not an obligately symbiotic organism. Despite this fact, C. chlorochromatii has never been found in a free-living state in naturally occurring bacterial communities.

== Metabolism ==
Chlorobium chlorochromatii conducts anoxygenic photosynthesis which means it does not produce oxygen as a waste product like plants and cyanobacteria, this type of photosynthesis is exclusive to Bacteria. In their electron transport chain reduced forms of sulfur, e.g., H_{2}S. These reduced forms of sulfur are used in the electron transport chain cyclic Photosystem 1 as electron donors to reduce NADP+ to NADPH. It grows under strictly anaerobic conditions as a photolithoautotroph. They grow best at a pH of 7.0-7.3 at 25 C in continuous light and absorb light maximally at 748 and 453 nm.

== Genome structure ==
Chlorobium chlorochromatii contains a circular genome that contains 2,572,079 bp. There are a total of 2047 genes contained on its chromosome. Of these 2047 genes, there are 1999 protein coding genes and 48 RNA coding genes. There are no pseudogenes contained within the chromosome of C. chlorochromatii. Data from DNA analysis suggests that genomes of green sulfur bacteria range between 2-3.3 Mb. From these data, it can be assumed that the total genome size of the consortium of C. aggregatum is less than 10 Mb in length.
