= Chromatophore (bacteria) =

Bacterial membrane-associated photosynthetic vesicle

Structural model of the chromatophore showing ATP synthase (orange), light-harvesting complexes (green and red), cytochrome bc_{1} (magenta), and photosynthetic reaction center (blue). Half of the model is transparent to show the bacteriochlorophylls represented as rings.

A chromatophore is a pigmented (colored), membrane-associated vesicle used to perform photosynthesis in some photosynthetic bacteria.

Chromatophores contain bacteriochlorophyll pigments and carotenoids. In purple bacteria, such as Rhodospirillum rubrum, the light-harvesting proteins are intrinsic to the chromatophore membranes. However, in green sulfur bacteria, they are arranged in specialised antenna complexes called chlorosomes.
