= Prosthecochloris aestuarii =

Scientific classification
- Domain: Bacteria
- Kingdom: Pseudomonadati
- Phylum: Chlorobiota
- Class: Chlorobiia
- Order: Chlorobiales
- Family: Chlorobiaceae
- Genus: Prosthecochloris
- Species: P. aestuarii

Binomial name
- Prosthecochloris aestuarii Gorlenko, 1970 emend. Imhoff, 2003

Species of bacterium

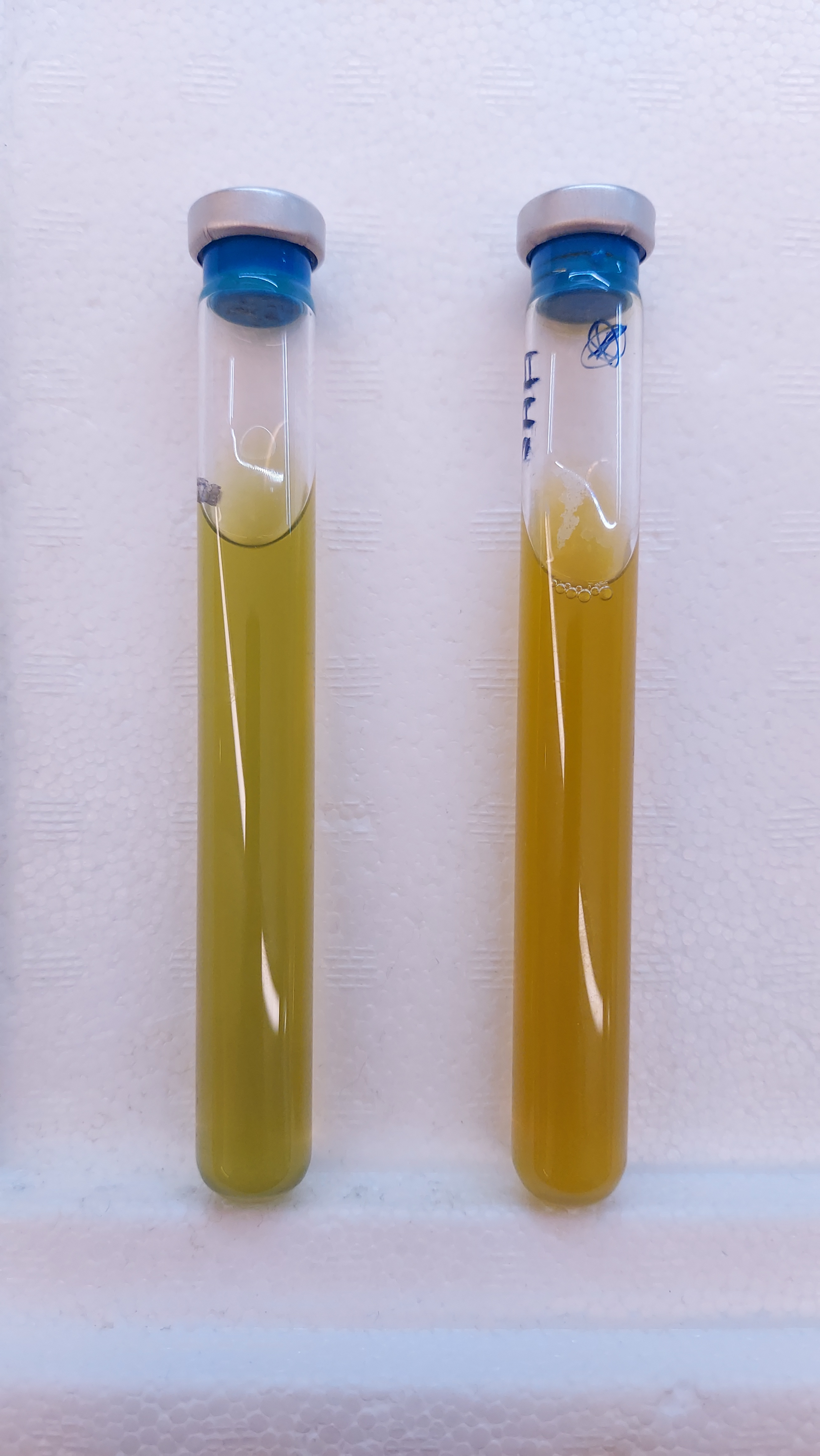
Two tubes of Prosthecochloris aestuarii culture. The left depicts a younger culture with a more green coloration. The right depicts an older culture with a browned coloration.

Prosthecochloris aestuarii is a green sulfur bacterium in the genus Prosthecochloris. This organism was originally isolated from brackish lagoons located in Sasyk-Sivash and Sivash. They are characterized by the presence of "prosthecae" on their cell surface; the inner part of these appendages house the photosynthetic machinery within chlorosomes, which are characteristic structures of green sulfur bacteria. Additionally, like other green sulfur bacteria, they are Gram-negative, non-motile, and non-spore forming. Of the four major groups of green sulfur bacteria, P. aestuarii serves as the type species for Group 4.

== Cell morphology ==
P. aestuarii are noted to have a more ellipsoidal shape, but may appear spherical after cell division. Additionally, they can range between 0.5 and 0.7 microns in width and between 1.0 and 1.2 microns in length, and individual cells can produce up to 20 of the prosthecae appendages. These prosthecae can extend an additional 0.1 to 1.7 microns beyond the cells surface, but the diameters are usually small, ranging between 0.1 and 0.17 microns. It has been found that prosthecae length can be dependent on the light intensity in which P. aestuarii is growing.

P. aestuarii cells have also been noted to form filament-like structures when cell divisions are not fully completed.

== Phylogeny ==
Several analyses of evolutionary relationships between the green sulfur bacteria have shown that P. aestuarii consistently clades with other Prosthecochloris species. They tend to rest on a distinct clade, separate from other key genera, like Chlorobaculum, Chlorobium, or Pelodictyon.

== Photosynthesis ==
Like all other green sulfur bacteria, P. aestuarii gets its energy through a process called anoxygenic photosynthesis. Their major pigment is bacteriochlorophyll c, giving the cultures a green appearance; however, as they age, cultures can become a dirty green/brown, or white with build-up of elemental sulfur. They can they utilize electrons from various electron donors, including sulfide, elemental sulfur, and while P. aestuarii cannot utilize thiosulfate, other Prosthecochloris strains may be able to utilize this electron donor as well.

As a member of the green sulfur bacteria, P. aestuarii only contains Photosystem I, within which a Type I reaction center is housed. Electrons from the reduced sulfur compound are transferred through a menaquinone, the cytochrome bc_{1} complex, the cytochrome c complex, and finally to the pigment of the reaction center. The electrons continue to be passed down a chain of acceptors once the pigment is excited by photons, including iron-sulfur clusters, within the reaction center until finally being transferred to a ferredoxin protein. Electrons can be further transferred to NAD using a ferredoxin-NADP+ reductase enzyme.

== Other key metabolisms ==
=== Sulfur oxidation ===
As noted, reduced sulfur compounds provide electrons for photosynthesis and subsequent carbon fixation.

==== Sulfide:quinone oxidoreductase ====
Sulfide:quinone oxidoreductase (SQR) is found in many green sulfur bacteria and is usually responsible for the first steps of sulfide oxidation. This enzyme catalyzes the initial transfer of electrons from sulfide to the menaquinone in photosynthesis.

==== Dissimilatory sulfite reductase ====
Most green sulfur bacteria have the operon coding for dissimilatory sulfite reductase (DSR) genes in order to oxidize sulfide. DsrEFH transfers the sulfur atom to DsrC, forming DsrC-trisulfide. Oxidation to sulfite is catalyzed by the DsrAB complex. Other portions of the Dsr pathway contribute to quinone pools throughout the cell.

==== Quinone-interacting membrane-bound oxidoreductase ====
The final oxidation step from sulfite to sulfate is typically carried out by the Quinone-interacting membrane-bound oxidoreductase (Qmo) / APS reductase (Apr) / Sulfate adenylyltransferase (Sat) complex, yet these genes are notably absent from the genome of P. aestuarii.

Previous growth experiments have found that elemental sulfur seems to be the greatest byproduct of sulfur oxidation, with sulfite and sulfate being below detection levels after growth. Whether or not P. aestuarii is capable of complete oxidation of sulfate is still up for debate.

=== Carbon fixation ===
Like other green sulfur bacteria, P. aestuarii fixes carbon via the reverse tricarboxylic acid (rTCA) cycle (also known as the reverse Krebs cycle). Carbon dioxide (CO_{2}) or bicarbonate (HCO_{3}^{−}), and electrons from reduced ferredoxins, can be used to synthesize acetyl-CoA. This pathway is characterized by the presence of the ATP-dependent citrate lyase, which catalyzes the cleavage of citrate into acetyl-CoA and oxaloacetate. This enzyme replaces citrate synthase, present in the canonical TCA cycle.

=== Nitrogen fixation ===
P. aestuarii is a diazotroph, able to fix dinitrogen into ammonia via nitrogenase and various cofactors coded for by nif genes.

== See also ==
- List of bacterial orders
- List of bacterial genera
