= John M. Olson (biophysicist) =

- Born: John Melvin Olson; September 18, 1929; Niagara Falls, New York, U.S.
- Died: July 2, 2017 (aged 87); Easthampton, Massachusetts, U.S.
- Education: Wesleyan University; University of Pennsylvania
- Known for: FMO complex
- Spouse(s): Caroline Claypool (m. 1953; 3 children) (d. 2008) Betty Schaffer (m. 2011)
- Scientific career
- Fields: Chemistry · Biology
- Workplaces: Brookhaven National Laboratory; Odense University
- Doctoral advisor: Martin Kamen
- Other academic advisors: Britton Chance; Lucile Smith

John M. Olson (September 18, 1929 – July 2, 2017) was an American biophysicist and pioneer researcher in photosynthesis, especially light harvesting complex of green sulfur bacteria.

In 1962 Olson was the first to discover and characterize pigment-protein complex of green sulfur bacteria (Chlorobiota), which was later named after him as Fenna–Matthews–Olson complex. In 1980s he intensively studied bacteriochlorophyll self-assembly in chlorosomes of green sulfur and green non-sulfur bacteria.
