= Chlorobaculum tepidum =

Scientific classification
- Domain: Bacteria
- Kingdom: Pseudomonadati
- Phylum: Chlorobiota
- Class: Chlorobiia
- Order: Chlorobiales
- Family: Chlorobiaceae
- Genus: Chlorobaculum
- Species: C. tepidum

Binomial name
- Chlorobaculum tepidum (Wahlund et al. 1996) Imhoff 2003

Synonyms
- Chlorobium tepidum Wahlund et al. 1996

Species of bacterium

Chlorobaculum tepidum, previously known as Chlorobium tepidum, is an anaerobic, thermophilic green sulfur bacteria first isolated from New Zealand. Its cells are gram-negative and non-motile rods of variable length. They contain chlorosomes and bacteriochlorophyll a and c.

== Natural habitat and environmental requirements ==
Like other green sulfur bacteria C. tepidum requires light and specific compounds to perform anoxygenic photosynthesis. C. tepidum differs from other green sulfur bacteria in that it cannot easily use H_{2} or Fe^{2+} as electron donors, relying on elemental sulfur, sulfide, and thiosulfate instead. To fulfill their metabolic requirements, they reside primarily in anaerobic sulfur rich environments such as anaerobic levels of stratified lakes and lagoons, anaerobic levels of layered organic bacterial mats, and in hot springs where there is abundant sulfur. C. tepidum and other green sulfur bacteria also play a large role within the carbon and sulfur cycles. Within the sulfur cycle, they contribute to the oxidative branch by oxidizing reduced sulfur compounds. Within anaerobic sediment layers C. tepidum is able to couple carbon and sulfur cycling in a metabolically favorable way.

== Photosynthetic mechanism ==
As it was mentioned before, C. tepidum performs anoxygenic photosynthesis. Within each cell there are 200–250 chlorosomes that are attached to the cytoplasmic side of reaction centers inserted within the inner cell membrane. The ellipsoidal shaped complexes act as light harvesting antenna to capture energy. Within each chlorosome are 215,000 ± 80,000 bacteriochlorophyll C that act as pigment molecules and absorb unique wavelengths of light relative to their color. C. tepidum contains genes that play an important role in the methylation of the C-8 and C-12 carbons of bacteriochlorophyll C. This methylation allows for BChl C levels to fluctuate in response to a change in the availability of light, resulting in a high efficiency of light harvesting and allowing C. tepidum to survive in areas of very low light intensity. Light energy is harvested by the chlorosomes and used in conjunction with H_{2}, reduced sulfur compounds, or ferrous iron to perform redox reactions and provide energy to fix CO_{2} via the reverse tricarboxcylic acid cycle.

== Genome structure ==
Chlorobaculum tepidum contains a genome that contains 2.15 Mbp, within there are a total of 2,337 genes (of these genes, there are 2,245 protein coding genes and 56 tRNA and rRNA coding genes). Its synthesis of chlorophyll a and bacteriochlorophylls a and c make it a model organism used to elucidate the biosynthesis of bacteriochlorophylls c. Present in the genome of C. tepidum are a multitude of genes that protect the bacterium against the presence of oxygen. The fact that such a large part of the genome is used to encode for protections against oxygen points to the possibility that C. tepidum spent a long period of its evolutionary history in proximity to oxygen, and therefore needed pathways that ensured that living in the presence of oxygen would not substantially harm the bacterium. Several of its carotenoid metabolic pathways (including a novel lycopene cyclase) have similar counterparts in cyanobacteria.
