= Photoautotroph =

Organisms that use light and inorganic carbon to produce organic materials

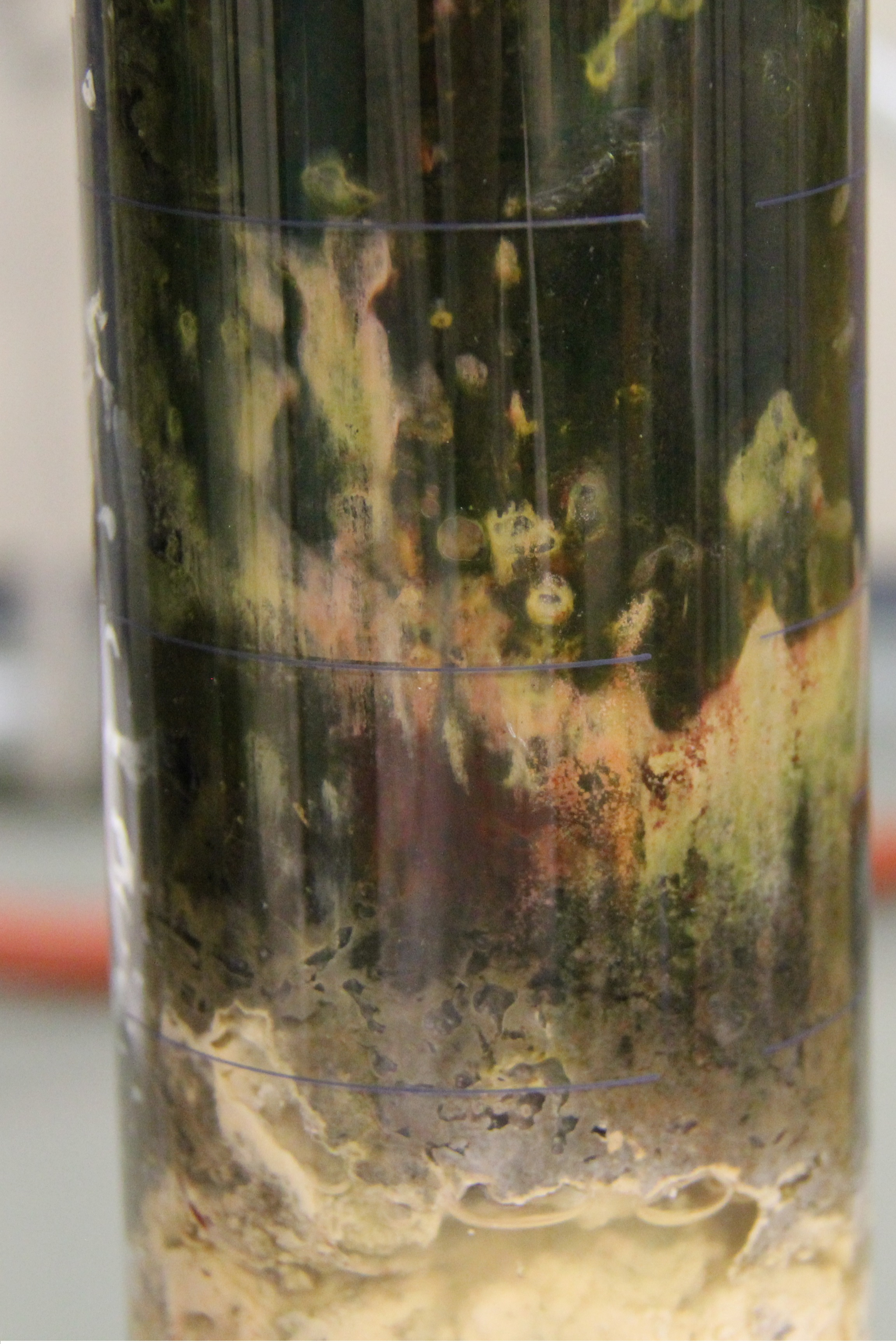
Winogradsky column showing Photoautotrophs in purple and green

Photoautotrophs are organisms that can utilize light energy from sunlight, and elements (such as carbon) from inorganic compounds, to produce organic materials needed to sustain their own metabolism (i.e. autotrophy). Such biological activities are known as photosynthesis, and examples of such organisms include plants, algae and cyanobacteria.

Eukaryotic photoautotrophs absorb photonic energy through the photopigment chlorophyll (a porphyrin derivative) in their endosymbiont chloroplasts, while prokaryotic photoautotrophs use chlorophylls and bacteriochlorophylls present in free-floating cytoplasmic thylakoids. Plants, algae, and cyanobacteria perform oxygenic photosynthesis that produces oxygen as a byproduct, while some bacteria perform anoxygenic photosynthesis.

== Origin and the Great Oxidation Event ==
Chemical and geological evidence indicate that photosynthetic cyanobacteria existed about 2.6 billion years ago and anoxygenic photosynthesis had been taking place since a billion years before that. Oxygenic photosynthesis was the primary source of free oxygen and led to the Great Oxidation Event roughly 2.4 to 2.1 billion years ago during the Neoarchean-Paleoproterozoic boundary. Although the end of the Great Oxidation Event was marked by a significant decrease in gross primary productivity that eclipsed extinction events, the development of aerobic respiration enabled more energetic metabolism of organic molecules, leading to symbiogenesis and the evolution of eukaryotes, and allowing the diversification of complex life on Earth.

== Prokaryotic photoautotrophs ==
Prokaryotic photoautotrophs include Cyanobacteria, Pseudomonadota, Chloroflexota, Acidobacteriota, Chlorobiota, Bacillota, Gemmatimonadota, and Eremiobacterota.

Cyanobacteria is the only prokaryotic group that performs oxygenic photosynthesis. Anoxygenic photosynthetic bacteria use PSI- and PSII-like photosystems, which are pigment protein complexes for capturing light. Both of these photosystems use bacteriochlorophyll. There are multiple hypotheses for how oxygenic photosynthesis evolved. The loss hypothesis states that PSI and PSII were present in anoxygenic ancestor cyanobacteria from which the different branches of anoxygenic bacteria evolved. The fusion hypothesis states that the photosystems merged later through horizontal gene transfer. The most recent hypothesis suggests that PSI and PSII diverged from an unknown common ancestor with a protein complex that was coded by one gene. These photosystems then specialized into the ones that are found today.

== Eukaryotic photoautotrophs ==
Eukaryotic photoautotrophs include red algae, haptophytes, stramenopiles, cryptophytes, chlorophytes, and land plants. These organisms perform photosynthesis through organelles called chloroplasts and are believed to have originated about 2 billion years ago. Comparing the genes of chloroplast and cyanobacteria strongly suggests that chloroplasts evolved as a result of endosymbiosis with cyanobacteria that gradually lost the genes required to be free-living. However, it is difficult to determine whether all chloroplasts originated from a single, primary endosymbiotic event, or multiple independent events. Some brachiopods (Gigantoproductus) and bivalves (Tridacna) also evolved photoautotrophy.
