= John Olson =

John Olson may refer to:

- John Olson (Minnesota politician) (1906–1981), member of the Minnesota Senate
- John Olson (photographer), American photographer
- John Olson (writer) (born 1947), American poet and novelist
- John Olson (artist), a member of noise rock band Wolf Eyes
- John E. Olson (1917–2012), retired U.S. Army colonel
- John Olson (Wisconsin politician) (1892–1982), Wisconsin state senator
- John M. Olson (biophysicist) (1929–2017), American biochemist, pioneering researcher in photosynthesis
- John M. Olson (general), United States Air Force general
- John T. Olson (1929–2011), United States Air Force general
- Johnny Olson (1910–1985), American radio and television announcer
- Jack B. Olson (1920–2003), American businessman and politician
- Jack Olson (Australian politician) (1916–2008), Australian politician
- John Olson (forger), American who pled guilty to forging thousands of Muhammad Ali and other autographs

== See also ==
- Jon Olsson (born 1982), skier
- John Olsen (disambiguation)
