= Chromatophore (disambiguation) =

Chromatophore may refer to:

== Biology ==
- Chromatophore, a kind of pigmented cell or organ found in some animals.
- Chromatophore (bacteria), a vesicle associated with the cell membrane used to photosynthesize.
- A photosynthetic organelle in the amoeboid Paulinella due to its independent origin from true chloroplasts (organellar chromatophore (Q22327998))

== Other uses ==
- "Chromatophore", a song by BT from _ (album)
