= Photoheterotroph =

Organism that uses light for energy but needs nutrients from elsewhere

Photoheterotrophs (Gk: photo = light, hetero = (an)other, troph = nourishment) are heterotrophic phototrophs—that is, they are organisms that use light for energy, but cannot use carbon dioxide as their sole carbon source. Consequently, they use organic compounds from the environment to satisfy their carbon requirements; these compounds include carbohydrates, fatty acids, and alcohols. Examples of photoheterotrophic organisms include purple non-sulfur bacteria, green non-sulfur bacteria, and heliobacteria. These microorganisms are ubiquitous in aquatic habitats, occupy unique niche-spaces, and contribute to global biogeochemical cycling. Recent research has also indicated that some species of eukaryotes such as the oriental hornet and some aphids may be able to use light to supplement their energy supply. This is poorly studied; current research is not sufficient to determine whether this is rare among eukaryotic organisms, or just unidentified.

== Research ==
Studies have shown that mammalian mitochondria can also capture light and synthesize ATP when mixed with pheophorbide, a light-capturing metabolite of chlorophyll. Research demonstrated that the same metabolite when fed to the worm Caenorhabditis elegans leads to increase in ATP synthesis upon light exposure, along with an increase in life span.

Furthermore, inoculation experiments suggest that mixotrophic Ochromonas danica (i.e., Golden algae)—and comparable eukaryotes—favor photoheterotrophy in oligotrophic (i.e., nutrient-limited) aquatic habitats. This preference may increase energy-use efficiency and growth by reducing investment in inorganic carbon fixation (e.g., production of autotrophic machineries such as RuBisCo and PSII).

== Energy and carbon sources ==
Photoheterotrophs get energy from light and carbon from organic substances like carbohydrates, fatty acids, or alcohols.

They're different from photoautotrophs, which use carbon dioxide for carbon, and from chemoheterotrophs, which get both energy and carbon from organic compounds. Photoheterotrophy tends to be useful in places where light is available but carbon dioxide is in short supply—like some parts of the ocean or shallow water environments.

== Metabolism ==
Photoheterotrophs generate ATP using light, in one of two ways: they use a bacteriochlorophyll-based reaction center, or they use a bacteriorhodopsin. The chlorophyll-based mechanism is similar to that used in photosynthesis, where light excites the molecules in a reaction center and causes a flow of electrons through an electron transport chain (ETC). This flow of electrons through the proteins causes hydrogen ions (protons) to be pumped across a membrane. The energy stored in this proton gradient is used to drive ATP synthesis. Unlike in photoautotrophs, the electrons flow only in a cyclic pathway: electrons released from the reaction center flow through the ETC and return to the reaction center. They are not utilized to reduce any organic compounds. Purple non-sulfur bacteria, green non-sulfur bacteria, and heliobacteria are examples of bacteria that carry out this scheme of photoheterotrophy.

Other organisms, including halobacteria, flavobacteria, and vibrios, have purple-rhodopsin-based proton pumps that supplement their energy supply. The archaeal version is called bacteriorhodopsin, while the eubacterial version is called proteorhodopsin. The pump consists of a single protein bound to a Vitamin A derivative: retinal. The pump may have accessory pigments (e.g., carotenoids) associated with the protein. When light is absorbed by the retinal molecule, the molecule isomerises. This drives the protein to change shape and pump a proton across the membrane. The proton gradient can then be used to generate ATP, transport solutes across the membrane, or drive a flagellar motor. One particular flavobacterium cannot reduce carbon dioxide using light, but uses the energy from its rhodopsin system to fix carbon dioxide through anaplerotic fixation. The flavobacterium is still a heterotroph as it needs reduced carbon compounds to live and cannot subsist on only light and CO_{2}. It cannot carry out reactions in the form of

n CO_{2} + 2n H_{2}D + photons → (CH_{2}O)_{n} + 2n D + n H_{2}O,

where H_{2}D may be water, H_{2}S or another compound/compounds providing the reducing electrons and protons; the 2D + H_{2}O pair represents an oxidized form.

However, it can fix carbon in reactions like:

CO_{2} + pyruvate + ATP (from photons) → malate + ADP +P_{i}

where malate or other useful molecules are otherwise obtained by breaking down other compounds by

carbohydrate + O_{2} → malate + CO_{2} + energy.

This method of carbon fixation is useful when reduced carbon compounds are scarce and cannot be wasted as CO_{2} during interconversions, but energy is plentiful in the form of sunlight.

== Examples of photoheterotrophs ==
Organisms that are known to be photoheterotrophic include:

- Members of the Heliobacteria
- Purple non-sulfur bacteria like Rhodospirillum rubrum
- Green non-sulfur bacteria such as Chloroflexus aurantiacus
- Salt-loving archaea like Halobacterium salinarum
- Some marine bacteria, especially aerobic anoxygenic phototrophs and those with proteorhodopsin

Some other organisms—though not true photoheterotrophs—have interesting features that might be similar. For example, the Oriental hornet can absorb light with pigments in its body and may use that light for energy. Certain aphids have also been shown to make light-sensitive carotenoids that could help them get energy from sunlight. A few recent studies even suggest that yeast cells can be modified to respond to light by inserting genes that allow them to use rhodopsin.

== Ecology ==
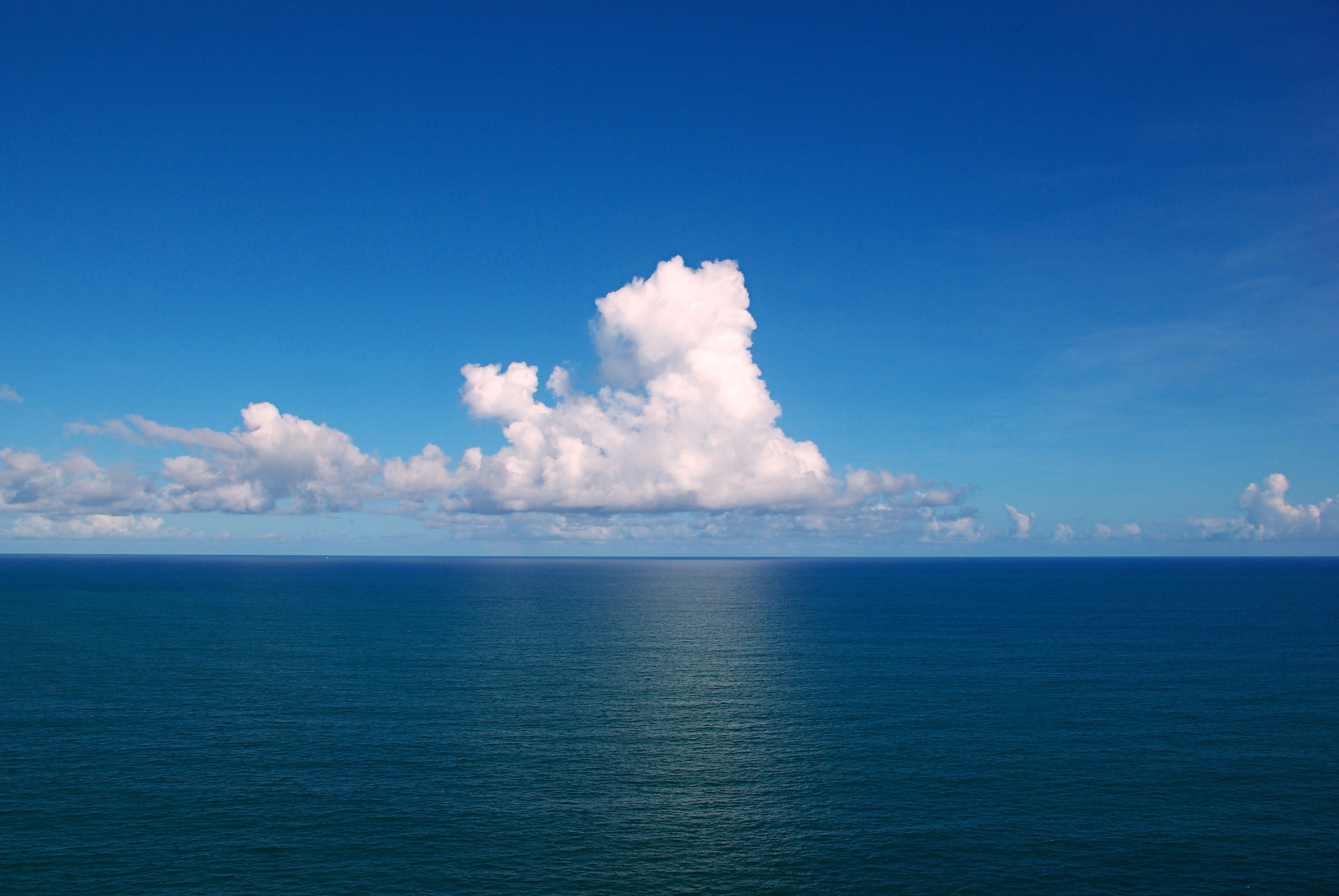
Photoheterotrophs are ubiquitous in marine ecosystems. Notably, bacteria and archaea may use proteorhodopsin as a supplementary, light-driven energy source.

=== Distribution and niche partitioning ===
Photoheterotrophs are found in many different water-based environments like oceans, lakes, and even rice paddies. They tend to live near the surface of the water, where there's enough light but not much carbon dioxide. Photoheterotrophs—either 1) cyanobacteria (i.e. facultative heterotrophs in nutrient-limited environments like Synechococcus and Prochlorococcus), 2) aerobic anoxygenic photoheterotrophic bacteria (AAP; employing bacteriochlorophyll-based reaction centers), 3) proteorhodopsin (PR)-containing bacteria and archaea, and 4) heliobacteria (i.e., the only phototroph with bacteriochlorophyll g pigments, or Gram-positive membrane) are found in various aquatic habitats including oceans, stratified lakes, rice fields, and environmental extremes.

In oceans' photic zones, up to 10% of bacterial cells are capable of AAP, whereas greater than 50% of net marine microorganisms house PR—reaching up to 90% in coastal biomes. As demonstrated in inoculation experiments, photoheterotrophy may provide these planktonic microbes competitive advantages 1) relative to chemoheterotrophs in oligotrophic (i.e., nutrient-poor) environments via increased nutrient use-efficiency (i.e., organic carbon fuels biosynthesis, excessively, versus energy production) and 2) by eliminating investment in physiologically costly autotrophic enzymes/complexes (RuBisCo and PSII). Furthermore, in Arctic oceans, AAP and PR photoheterotrophs are prominent in ice-covered regions during wintertime per light scarcity. Lastly, seasonal turnover has been observed in marine AAPs as ecotypes (i.e., genetically similar taxa with differing functional trait and/or environmental preferences) segregate into temporal niches.

In stratified (i.e., euxinic) lakes, photoheterotrophs—alongside other anoxygenic phototrophs (e.g., purple/green sulfur bacteria fixing carbon dioxide via electron donors such as ferrous iron, sulfide, and hydrogen gas)—often occupy the chemocline in the water column and/or sediments. In this zone, dissolved oxygen is reduced, light is limited to long wavelengths (e.g., red and infrared) left-over by oxygenic phototrophs (e.g., cyanobacteria), and anaerobic metabolisms (i.e., those occurring in the absence of oxygen) begin introducing sulfide and bioavailable nutrients (e.g., organic carbon, phosphate, and ammonia) through upward diffusion.

Heliobacteria are obligate anaerobes primarily located in rice fields, where low sulfide concentrations prevent competitive exclusion of purple/green sulfur bacteria. These waterlogged environments may facilitate symbiotic relationships between heliobacteria and rice plants as fixed nitrogen—from the former—is exchanged for carbon-rich root exudates.

Observation studies have characterized photoheterotrophs (e.g., Green non-sulfur bacteria such as Chloroflexi and AAPs) within photosynthetic mats at environmental extremes (e.g., hot springs and hypersaline lagoons). Notably, temperature and pH drive anoxygenic phototroph community composition in Yellowstone National Park's geothermal features. In addition, various, light-dependent niches in the Great Salt Lake's hypersaline mats support phototrophic diversity as microbes optimize energy production and combat osmotic stress.

=== Biogeochemical cycling ===
Photoheterotrophs influence global carbon cycling by assimilating dissolved organic carbon (DOC). Therefore, when harvesting light-energy, carbon is maintained in the microbial loop without corresponding respiration (i.e., carbon dioxide release to the atmosphere as DOC is oxidized to fuel energy production). This disconnect, the discovery of facultative photoheterotrophs (e.g., AAPs with flexible energy sources), and previous measurements taken in the dark (i.e., to avoid skewed oxygen consumption values due to photooxidation, UV light, and oxygenic photosynthesis) lead to overestimated aquatic CO_{2} emissions. For example, a 15.2% decrease in community respiration was observed in Cep Lake, Czechia—alongside preferential glucose and pyruvate uptake—is attributed to facultative photoheterotrophs preferring light-energy during the daytime, given fitness benefits mentioned previously.

== Flowchart ==
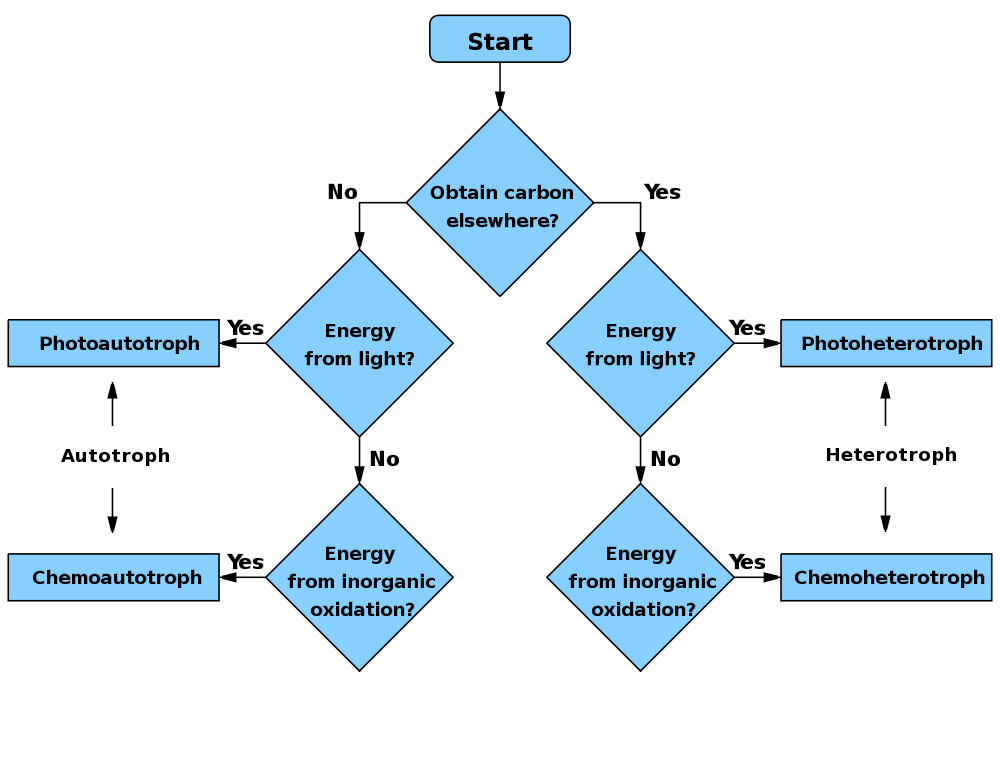
Flowchart to determine if a species is autotroph, heterotroph, or a subtype

Energy source Carbon source	Chemotroph	Phototroph
Autotroph	Chemoautotroph	Photoautotroph
Heterotroph	Chemoheterotroph	Photoheterotroph

== See also ==
- Primary nutritional groups
