= Rhodopin =

Names
- IUPAC name 1,2-Dihydro-ψ,ψ-caroten-1-ol
- Systematic IUPAC name (6E,8E,10E,12E,14E,16E,18E,20E,22E,24E,26E)-2,6,10,14,19,23,27,31-Octamethyldotriaconta-6,8,10,12,14,16,18,20,22,24,26,30-dodecaen-2-ol
- Other names 1-Hydroxylycopene; 1-hydroxy-1,2-dihydrolycopene; all-trans-2,6,10,14,19,23,27,31-octamethyldotriaconta-6,8,10,12,14,16,18,20,22,24,26,30-dodecaen-2-ol

Identifiers
CAS Number	105-92-0
3D model (JSmol)	Interactive image
Beilstein Reference	1730252
ChEBI	CHEBI:35331
ChemSpider	4517822
KEGG	C19795
PubChem CID	5365880
UNII	9EYB433RXU
CompTox Dashboard (EPA)	DTXSID201019006
- InChI: InChI=1S/C40H58O/c1-33(2)19-13-22-36(5)25-16-28-37(6)26-14-23-34(3)20-11-12-21-35(4)24-15-27-38(7)29-17-30-39(8)31-18-32-40(9,10)41/h11-12,14-17,19-21,23-30,41H,13,18,22,31-32H2,1-10H3/b12-11+,23-14+,24-15+,28-16+,29-17+,34-20+,35-21+,36-25+,37-26+,38-27+,39-30+ Key: CNYVJTJLUKKCGM-RGGGOQHISA-N
- SMILES: OC(C)(C)CCC\C(=C\C=C\C(=C\C=C\C(=C\C=C\C=C(\C=C\C=C(\C=C\C=C(/C)CC\C=C(/C)C)C)C)C)C)C

Properties
Chemical formula	C_{40}H_{58}O
Molar mass	554.903 g·mol^{−1}
Density	0.912 g/cm^{3}
- Except where otherwise noted, data are given for materials in their standard state (at 25 °C [77 °F], 100 kPa). Infobox references

Rhodopin (1,2-dihydro-ψ,ψ-caroten-1-ol) is a carotenoid. It is a major carotenoid of phototropic bacteria such as Rhodomicrobium vannielii and Rhodopseudomonas acidophila strain 7050.
