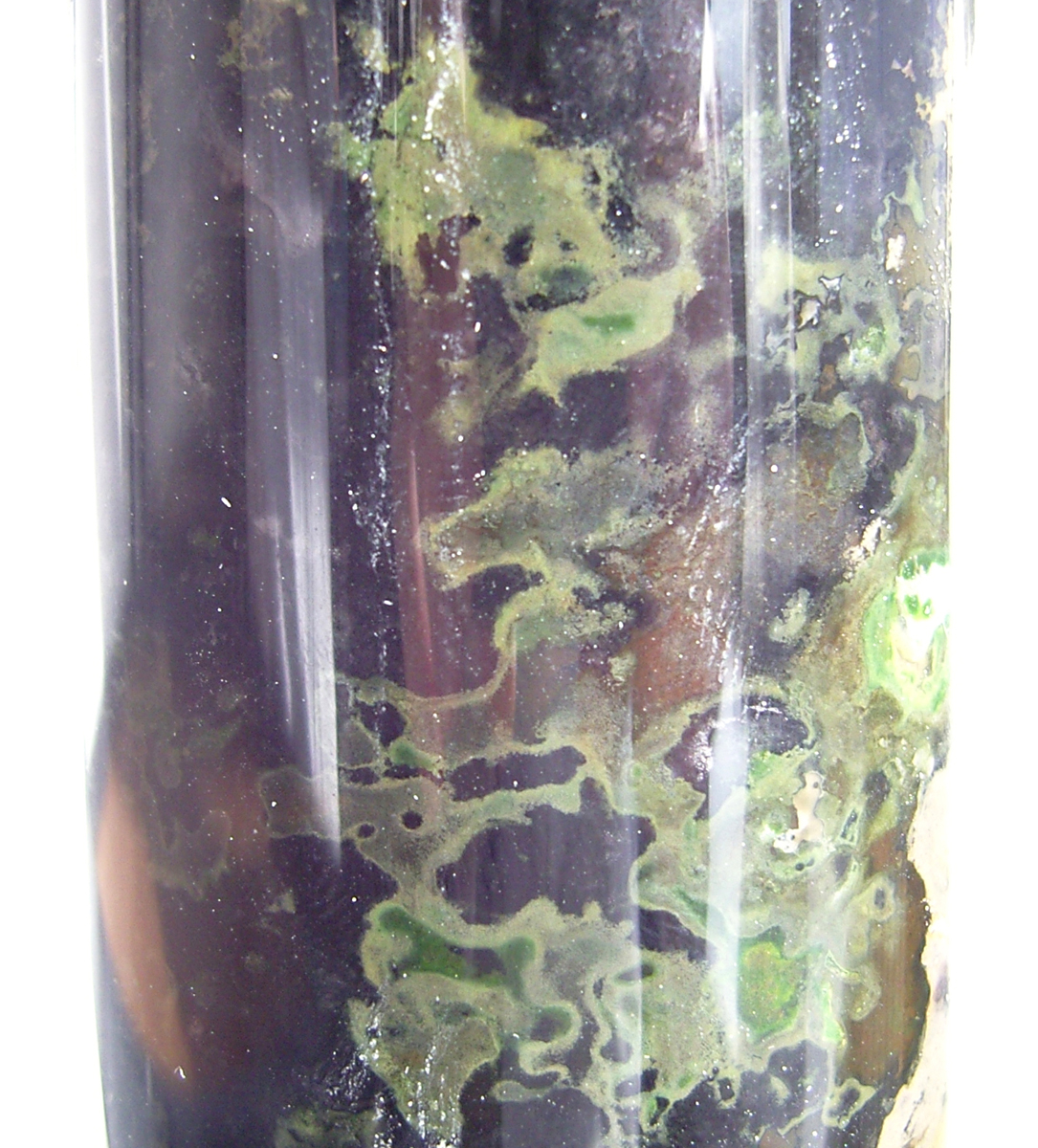

Scientific classification
- Domain: Bacteria
- Kingdom: Pseudomonadati
- Phylum: Chlorobiota
- Class: Chlorobiia
- Order: Chlorobiales
- Family: Chlorobiaceae
- Genus: Chlorobium; Nadson 1906

Type species
- Chlorobium limicola Nadson 1906

Species
- See text

Synonyms
- "Pediochloris" Geitler 1925; Pelodictyon Lauterborn 1913; "Schmidlea" Lauterborn 1913

= Chlorobium =

Genus of bacteria

Chlorobium is a genus of green sulfur bacteria. They are photolithotrophic oxidizers of sulfur and most notably utilise a noncyclic electron transport chain to reduce NAD+. Photosynthesis is achieved using a Type 1 Reaction Centre using bacteriochlorophyll (BChl) a. Two photosynthetic antenna complexes aid in light absorption: the Fenna-Matthews-Olson complex ("FMO", also containing BChl a), and the chlorosomes which employ mostly BChl c, d, or e. Hydrogen sulfide is used as an electron source and carbon dioxide its carbon source.

Chlorobium species exhibit a dark green color; in a Winogradsky column, the green layer often observed is composed of Chlorobium. This genus lives in strictly anaerobic conditions below the surface of a body of water, commonly the anaerobic zone of a eutrophic lake.

Chlorobium aggregatum is a species which exists in a symbiotic relationship with a colorless, nonphotosynthetic bacteria. This species looks like a bundle of green bacteria, attached to a central rod-like cell which can move around with a flagellum. The green, outer bacteria use light to oxidize sulfide into sulfate. The inner cell, which is not able to perform photosynthesis, reduces the sulfate into sulfide. These bacteria divide in unison, giving the structure a multicellular appearance which is highly unusual in bacteria.

Chlorobium species are thought to have played an important part in mass extinction events on Earth. If the oceans turn anoxic (due to the shutdown of ocean circulation) then Chlorobium would be able to out compete other photosynthetic life. They would produce huge quantities of methane and hydrogen sulfide which would cause global warming and acid rain. This would have huge consequences for other oceanic organisms and also for terrestrial organisms. Evidence for abundant Chlorobium populations is provided by chemical fossils found in sediments deposited at the Cretaceous mass extinction.

== Molecular signatures for Chlorobiota ==
Comparative genomic analysis has led to the identification of 2 conserved signature indels which are uniquely found in members of the phylum Chlorobiota (formerly Chlorobi) and are thus characteristic of the phylum. The first indel is a 28-amino-acid insertion in DNA polymerase III and the second is a 12 to 14 amino acid insertion in alanyl-tRNA synthetase. These indels are not found in any other bacteria and thus serve as molecular markers for the phylum. In addition to the conserved signature indels, 51 proteins which are uniquely found in members of the phylum Chlorobiota. 65 other proteins have been identified which are unique to the Chlorobiota phylum, however these proteins are missing in several Chlorobiota species and are not distributed throughout the phylum with any clear pattern. This means that significant gene loss may have occurred, or the presence of these proteins may be a result of horizontal gene transfer. Of these 65 proteins, 8 are found only in Chlorobium luteolum and Chlorobium phaeovibrioides. These two species form a strongly supported clade in phylogenetic trees and a close relationship between these species is further supported by the unique sharing of these 8 proteins.

=== Relatedness of Chlorobiota to Bacteroidota and Fibrobacterota phyla ===
Species from the Bacteroidota (formerly Bacteroidetes) and Chlorobiota phyla branch very closely together in phylogenetic trees, indicating a close relationship. Through the use of comparative genomic analysis, 3 proteins have been identified which are uniquely shared by virtually all members of the Bacteroidota and Chlorobiota phyla. The sharing of these 3 proteins is significant because other than these 3 proteins, no proteins from either the Bacteroidota or Chlorobiota phyla are shared by any other groups of bacteria. Several conserved signature indels have also been identified which are uniquely shared by members of the Bacteroidota and Chlorobiota phyla. The presence of these molecular signatures supports the close relationship of the Bacteroidota and Chlorobiota phyla. Additionally, the phylum Fibrobacterota (formerly Fibrobacteres) is indicated to be specifically related to these two phyla. A clade consisting of these three phyla is strongly supported by phylogenetic analyses based upon a number of different proteins These phyla also branch in the same position based upon conserved signature indels in a number of important proteins. Lastly and most importantly, two conserved signature indels (in the RpoC protein and in serine hydroxymethyltransferase) and one signature protein PG00081 have been identified that are uniquely shared by all of the species from these three phyla. All of these results provide compelling evidence that the species from these three phyla shared a common ancestor exclusive of all other bacteria and it has been proposed that they should all recognized as part of a single “FCB”superphylum.

== Phylogeny ==
The currently accepted taxonomy is based on the List of Prokaryotic names with Standing in Nomenclature (LPSN) and National Center for Biotechnology Information (NCBI).

16S rRNA based LTP_10_2024

- - Chlorobium phaeovibrioides
  - - - Prosthecochloris
    - - - Pelodictyon clathratiforme (Szafer 1911) Lauterborn 1913
        - Chlorobium phaeobacteroides
      - - Chlorobium limicola (type sp.)
        - - Chlorobium luteolum
          - Chlorobaculum

120 marker proteins based GTDB 10-RS226

- - Prosthecochloris
  - - Chlorobaculum
    - - Chlorobium
        - - C. luteolum (Schmidle 1901) emend. Imhoff 2003
          - - "C. antarcticum" Panwar et al. 2021
            - C. phaeovibrioides Pfennig 1968
        - - - C. limicola Nadson 1906 emend. Imhoff 2003 (type sp.)
            - C. phaeobacteroides Pfennig 1968
          - - - "C. chlorochromatii" Meschner 1957 ex Vogl et al. 2006
              - C. clathratiforme (Szafer 1911) Imhoff 2003
            - - "C. ferrooxidans" Heising et al. 1998
              - "Ca. C. masyuteum" Lambrecht et al. 2021

Species incertae sedis:

- "C. bathyomarinum" Betty et al. 2005
- "Ca. C. canadense" Tsuji et al. 2020
- "C. gokarna" Kumar et al. 2005
