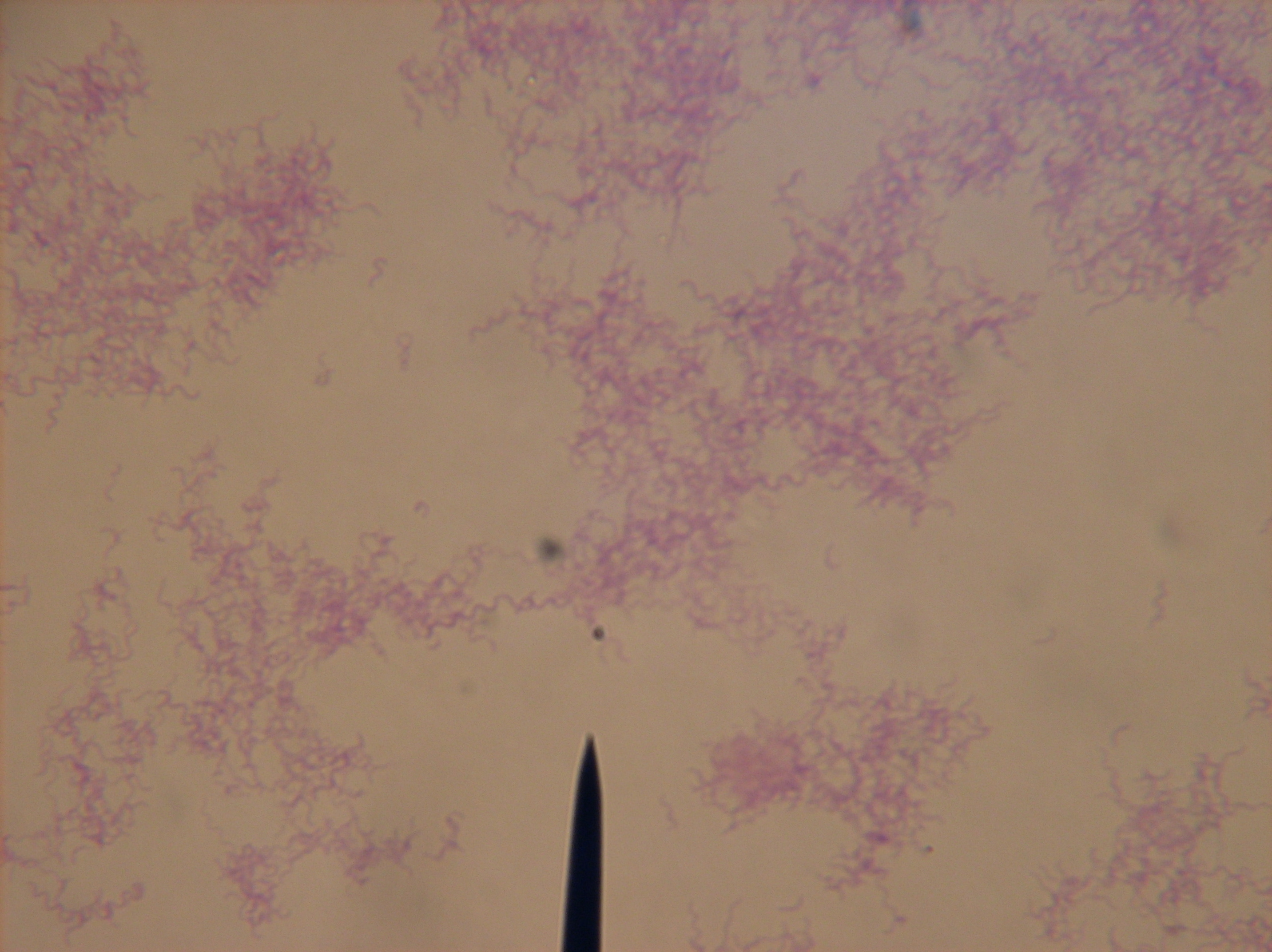

Scientific classification
- Domain: Bacteria
- Kingdom: Pseudomonadati
- Phylum: Pseudomonadota
- Class: Alphaproteobacteria
- Order: Rhodospirillales
- Family: Rhodospirillaceae
- Genus: Rhodospirillum
- Species: R. rubrum

Binomial name
- Rhodospirillum rubrum (Esmarch 1887) Molisch 1907

= Rhodospirillum rubrum =

Species of bacterium

Rhodospirillum rubrum (R. rubrum) is a Gram-negative bacterium, with a size of 0.8-1 μm. It is phylogenetically classified as a purple nonsulfur bacterium. It is a facultative anaerobe with a large set of possible metabolisms depending on the conditions of its environment. It's capable of using oxygen for aerobic respiration under aerobic conditions, or an alternative terminal electron acceptor for anaerobic respiration under anaerobic conditions. Alternative terminal electron acceptors for R. rubrum include dimethyl sulfoxide or trimethylamine oxide.

Under aerobic growth photosynthesis is genetically suppressed and R. rubrum is then colorless. After the exhaustion of oxygen, R. rubrum immediately starts the production of photosynthesis apparatus including membrane proteins, bacteriochlorophylls and carotenoids, i.e. the bacterium becomes photosynthesis active. The repression mechanism for the photosynthesis is poorly understood. The photosynthesis of R. rubrum differs from that of plants as it possesses not chlorophyll a, but bacteriochlorophylls. While bacteriochlorophyll can absorb light up to a maximum wavelength of 800 to 925 nm, chlorophyll absorbs light having a maximum wavelength of 660 to 680 nm. R. rubrum is a spiral-shaped bacterium (spirillum, plural form: spirilla).

R. rubrum is also a nitrogen fixing bacterium, i.e., it can express and regulate nitrogenase, a protein complex that can catalyse the conversion of atmospheric dinitrogen into ammonia. When the bacteria are exposed to ammonia, darkness, and phenazine methosulfate, nitrogen fixation stops. Due to this important property, R. rubrum has been the test subject of many different groups, so as to understand the complex regulatory schemes required for this reaction to occur. It was in R. rubrum that, for the first time, post-translational regulation of nitrogenase was demonstrated. Nitrogenase is modified by an ADP-ribosylation in the arginine residue 101 (Arg101) in response to the so-called "switch-off" effectors - glutamine or ammonia - and darkness.

R. rubrum has several potential uses in biotechnology:

- Quantitative accumulation of PHB (polyhydroxybutyrate) precursors in the cell for the production of bioplastic.
- Production of biological hydrogen fuel.
- Model system for studying the conversion from light energy to chemical energy and regulatory pathways of the nitrogen fixation system.
