= Chlorobium limicola =

Scientific classification
- Domain: Bacteria
- Kingdom: Pseudomonadati
- Phylum: Chlorobiota
- Class: "Chlorobia"
- Order: Chlorobiales
- Family: Chlorobiaceae
- Genus: Chlorobium
- Species: C. limicola

Binomial name
- Chlorobium limicola Nadson 1906 (Approved Lists 1980)

Species of bacterium

Chlorobium limicola is a gram negative bacterial member of green sulfur bacteria genus found in freshwater hot springs. C. limicola is a non-motile mesophile, photoautotrophic / photosynthetic strict anaerobe important to carbon, nitrogen and sulfur cycles in anoxic freshwater environments. Strain DSMZ 245 T was isolated from Gilroy Hot Springs in California, and whole genome sequencing was accomplished. Believed to be morphologically diverse, it was determined that culturing techniques determine some characteristics like slime production and morphology. As a green sulfur bacteria, C. limicola fixes carbon via reverse TCA cycle reactions.

== Genetics ==
Whole genome sequencing was accomplished on Strain DSMZ 245 isolated from Gilroy Hot Springs.

Genome length: 2,763,181bp

Total genes: 2576

Protein coding genes: 2522

NCBI Accession: GCA_000020465

== Biotech applications ==
Chlorobium limicola has potential in biogas cleanup due to the hydrogen sulfide oxidization process capabilities. Chlorobium limicola reduces hydrogen sulfide to elemental sulfur which could eliminate the use of chloroform for the extraction of sulfur from water.
