= Fenna–Matthews–Olson complex =

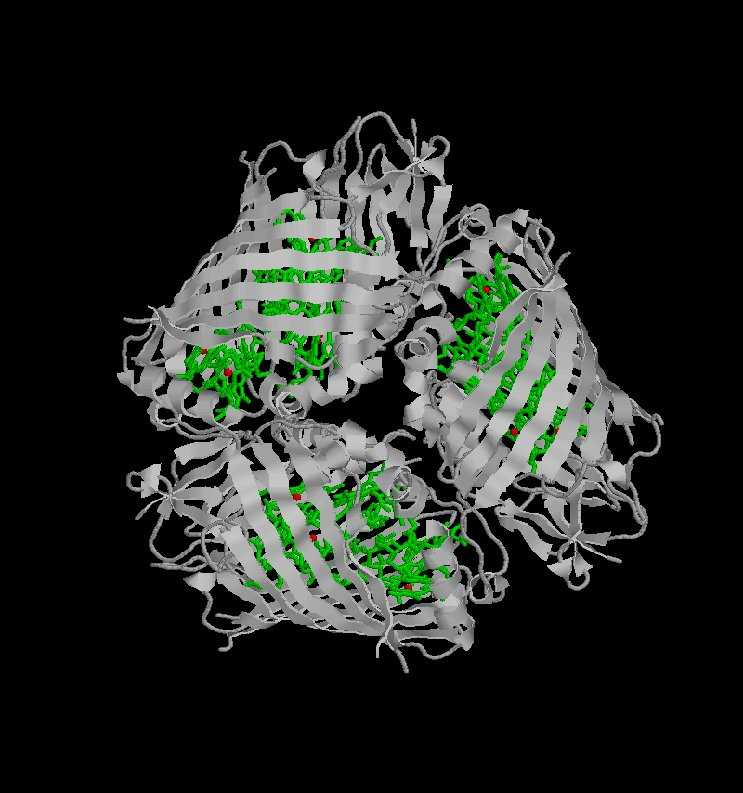
Figure 1. The FMO protein trimer. The BChl a molecules are depicted in green, the central magnesium atom in red and the protein in grey ("cartoons" representation). Each monomer contains bacteriochlorophylls.

The Fenna–Matthews–Olson (FMO) complex is a water-soluble complex and was the first pigment-protein complex (PPC) to be structurally analyzed by x-ray spectroscopy. It appears in green sulfur bacteria and mediates the excitation energy transfer from light-harvesting chlorosomes to the membrane-embedded bacterial reaction center (bRC). Its structure is trimeric (C3-symmetry). Each of the three monomers contains eight bacteriochlorophyll a (BChl a) molecules. They are bound to the protein scaffold via chelation of their central magnesium atom either to amino acids of the protein (mostly histidine) or water-bridged oxygen atoms (only one BChl a of each monomer).

Since the structure is available, calculating structure-based optical spectra is possible for comparison with experimental optical spectra. In the simplest case only the excitonic coupling of the BChls is taken into account. More realistic theories consider pigment-protein coupling. An important property is the local transition energy (site energy) of the BChls, different for each, due to their individual local protein environment. The site energies of the BChls determine the direction of the energy flow.

Some structural information on the FMO-RC super complex is available, which was obtained by electron microscopy and linear dichroism spectra measured on FMO trimers and FMO-RC complexes. From these measurements, two orientations of the FMO complex relative to the RC are possible. The orientation with BChl 3 and 4 close to the RC and BChl 1 and 6 (following Fenna and Matthews' original numbering) oriented towards the chlorosomes is useful for efficient energy transfer.

== Test object ==
The complex is the simplest PPC appearing in nature and therefore a suitable test object for the development of methods that can be transferred to more complex systems like photosystem I. Engel and co-workers observed that the FMO complex exhibits remarkably long quantum coherence, but after about a decade of debate, it was shown that this quantum coherence has no significance to the functioning of the complex. Furthermore, it was shown that the reported long lived oscillations observed in the spectra are solely due to groundstate vibrational dynamics and do not reflect any energy transfer dynamics.

== Quantum light harvesting ==
Light harvesting in photosynthesis employs both classical and quantum mechanical processes with an energy efficiency of almost 100 percent. For light to produce energy in classical processes, photons must reach reaction sites before their energy dissipates in less than one nanosecond. In photosynthetic processes, this is not possible. Because energy can exist in a superposition of states, it can travel all routes within a material at the same time. When a photon finds the correct destination, the superposition collapses, making the energy available. However, no purely quantum process can be wholly responsible, because some quantum processes slow down the movement of quantized objects through networks. Anderson localization prevents the spread of quantum states in random media. Because the state acts like a wave, it is vulnerable to disruptive interference effects. Another issue is the quantum zeno effect, in which an unstable state never changes if it is continuously measured/watched, because watching constantly nudges the state, preventing it from collapsing.

Interactions between quantum states and the environment act like measurements. The classical interaction with the environment changes the wave-like nature of the quantum state just enough to prevent Anderson localisation, while the quantum zeno effect extends the quantum state's lifetime, allowing it to reach the reaction centre. The proposed long lifetime of quantum coherence in the FMO influenced many scientists to investigate quantum coherence in the system, with Engel's 2007 paper being cited over 1500 times within 5 years of its publication. The proposal of Engel is still debated in literature with the suggestion that the original experiments were interpreted incorrectly assigning the spectral oscillations to electronic coherences instead of ground-state vibrational coherences, which will naturally be expected to live longer due to the narrower spectral width of vibrational transitions.

=== Computing ===
The problem of finding a reaction centre in a protein matrix is formally equivalent to many problems in computing. Mapping computing problems onto reaction center searches may allow light harvesting to work as a computational device, improving computational speeds at room temperature, yielding 100-1000x efficiency.
