= Rhodomicrobium =

Scientific classification
- Domain: Bacteria
- Kingdom: Pseudomonadati
- Phylum: Pseudomonadota
- Class: Alphaproteobacteria
- Order: Hyphomicrobiales
- Family: Hyphomicrobiaceae
- Genus: Rhodomicrobium; Duchow and Douglas 1949

Type species
- Rhodomicrobium vannielii

Species
- Rhodomicrobium udaipurense; Rhodomicrobium vannielii

Genus of bacteria

Rhodomicrobium is a microaerobic to anaerobic, purple non-sulfur, cluster-building genus of bacteria. Rhodomicrobium uses bacteriochlorophyll a and bacteriochlorophyll b for photosynthesis and occurs in fresh- and sea-water and in soil
