= John Olsen (disambiguation) =

John Olsen (born 1945) was premier of South Australia, 1996–2001.

John Olsen may also refer to:

- John W. Olsen (born 1955), American archaeologist
- John Olsen (Australian artist) (1928–2023), Australian landscape and abstract artist
- John Olsen (Danish artist) (1938–2019), Danish artist specializing in sculpture
- John Olsen (filmmaker) (1888–1959), Danish producer, screenwriter and studio owner
- John Olsen (footballer) (1928–2001), Norwegian footballer
- Jack Olsen (1925–2002), American journalist and author

== See also ==
- John Olson (disambiguation)
- Jon Olsen (born 1969), American freestyle swimmer
- Jon Olsson (born 1982), skier
