= Purple bacteria =

Group of phototrophic bacteria

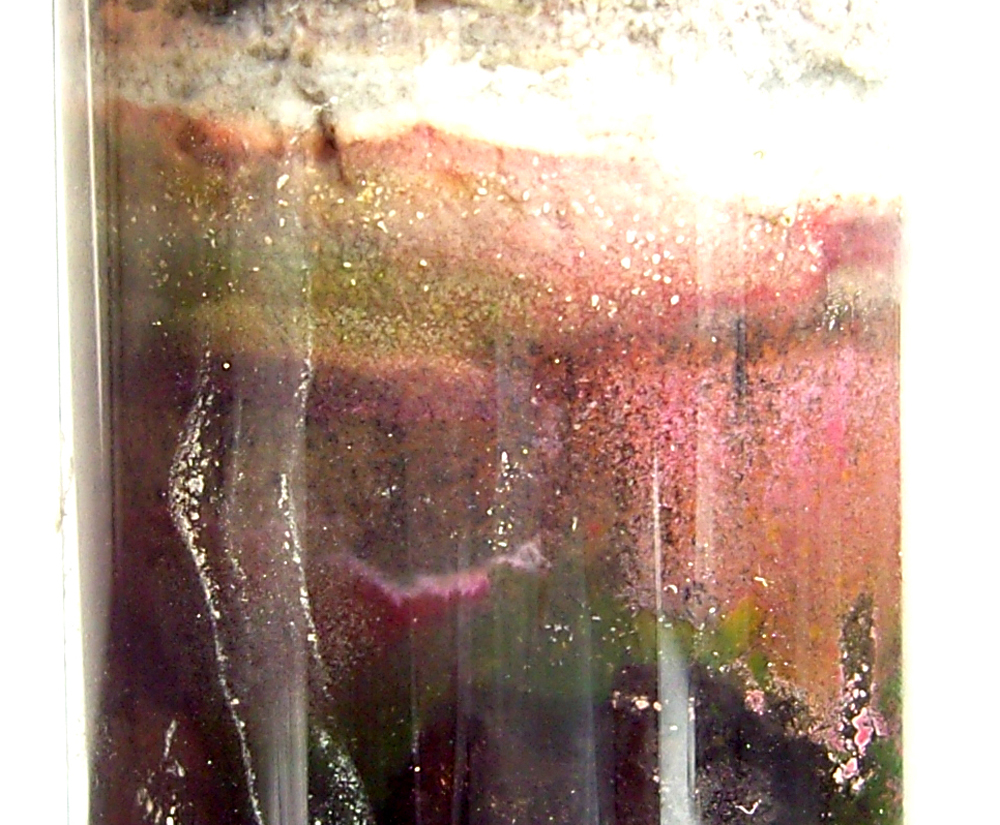
Purple bacteria grown in Winogradsky column

Purple bacteria or purple photosynthetic bacteria are Gram-negative proteobacteria that are phototrophic, capable of producing their own food via photosynthesis. They are pigmented with bacteriochlorophyll a or b, together with various carotenoids, which give them colours ranging between purple, red, brown, and orange. They may be divided into two groups – purple sulfur bacteria (Chromatiales, in part) and purple non-sulfur bacteria. Purple bacteria are anoxygenic phototrophs widely spread in nature, but especially in aquatic environments, where there are anoxic conditions that favor the synthesis of their pigments.

== Taxonomy ==
All purple bacteria belong in the phylum of Pseudomonadota. This phylum was established as Proteobacteria by Carl Woese in 1987 calling it "purple bacteria and their relatives". Purple bacteria are distributed between 3 classes: Alphaproteobacteria, Betaproteobacteria, Gammaproteobacteria each characterized by a photosynthetic phenotype. All these classes also contain numerous non-photosynthetic members, such as the nitrogen-fixing Rhizobium and the human gut bacterium Escherichia coli.

Purple non-sulfur bacteria are found in Alphaproteobacteria and Betaproteobacteria. The families are:

- Class Alphaproteobacteria (17 purple genera)
  - Order Rhodospirillales
    - Family Rhodospirillaceae, e.g. Rhodospirillum rubrum
    - Family Acetobacteraceae, e.g. Rhodopila globiformis
  - Order Hyphomicrobiales
    - Family Nitrobacteraceae, e.g. Rhodopseudomonas palustris
    - Family Hyphomicrobiaceae, e.g. Rhodomicrobium
    - Family Rhodobiaceae, e.g. Rhodobium (1 purple genus)
  - Order Rhodobacterales, family Rhodobacteraceae (3 purple genera)
- Class Betaproteobacteria (3 purple genera)
  - Family Rhodocyclaceae, e.g. Rhodocyclus (1 purple genus)
  - Family Comamonadaceae, e.g. Rhodoferax (2 purple genera)

Purple sulfur bacteria are named for the ability to produce elemental sulfur. They are included in the class Gammaproteobacteria, in the two families Chromatiaceae and Ectothiorhodospiraceae. While the former family stores the produced sulfur inside the cell, the latter sends the sulfur outside the cell. According to a 1985 phylogeny, Gammaproteobacteria is divided into three sub-lineages, with both families falling into the first along with non-photosynthetic species such as Nitrosococcus oceani.

The similarity between the photosynthetic machinery in these different lines indicates that it had a common origin, either from some common ancestor or passed by lateral transfer. Purple sulfur bacteria and purple nonsulfur bacteria were distinguished on the basis of physiological factors of their tolerance and utilization of sulfide: was considered that purple sulfur bacteria tolerate millimolar levels of sulfide and oxidize sulfide to sulfur globules stored intracellulary while purple nonsulfur bacteria species did neither. This kind of classification was not absoluted. It was refuted with classic chemostat experiments by Hansen and Van Gemerden (1972) that demonstrate the growing of many purple nonsulfur bacteria species at low levels of sulfide (0.5 mM) and in so doing, oxidize sulfide to S^{0}, S_{4}O^{2−}_{6}, or SO^{2−}_{4}. The important distinction that remains from these two different metabolisms is that: any S^{0} formed by purple nonsulfur bacteria is not stored intracellularly but is deposited outside the cell (even if there are exception for this as Ectothiorhodospiraceae). So if grown on sulfide it is easy to differentiate purple sulfur bacteria from purple non-sulfur bacteria because the microscopically globules of S^{0} are formed.

== Metabolism ==
Purple bacteria are able to perform different metabolic pathways that allow them to adapt to different and even extreme environmental conditions. They are mainly photoautotrophs, but are also known to be chemoautotrophic and photoheterotrophic. Since pigment synthesis does not take place in presence of oxygen, phototrophic growth only occurs in anoxic and light conditions. However purple bacteria can also grow in dark and oxic environments. In fact they can be mixotrophs, capable of anaerobic and aerobic respiration or fermentation basing on the concentration of oxygen and availability of light.

=== Photosynthesis ===
==== Photosynthetic unit ====
Purple bacteria use bacteriochlorophyll and carotenoids to obtain the light energy for photosynthesis. Electron transfer and photosynthetic reactions occur at the cell membrane in the photosynthetic unit which is composed by the light-harvesting complexes LHI and LHII and the photosynthetic reaction centre where the charge separation reaction occurs. These structures are located in the intracytoplasmic membrane, areas of the cytoplasmic membrane invaginated to form vesicle sacs, tubules, or single-paired or stacked lamellar sheets which have increased surface to maximize light absorption. Light-harvesting complexes are involved in the energy transfer to the reaction centre. These are integral membrane protein complexes consisting of monomers of α- and β-apoproteins, each one binding molecules of bacteriochlorophyll and carotenoids non-covalently. LHI is directly associated with the reaction centre forming a polymeric ring-like structure around it. LHI has an absorption maximum at 870 nm and it contains most of the bacteriochlorophyll of the photosynthetic unit. LHII contains fewer bacteriochlorophylls, has lower absorption maximum (850 nm) and is not present in all purple bacteria. Moreover, the photosynthetic unit in Purple Bacteria shows great plasticity, being able to adapt to the constantly changing light conditions. In fact these microorganisms are able to rearrange the composition and the concentration of the pigments, and consequently the absorption spectrum, in response to light variation.

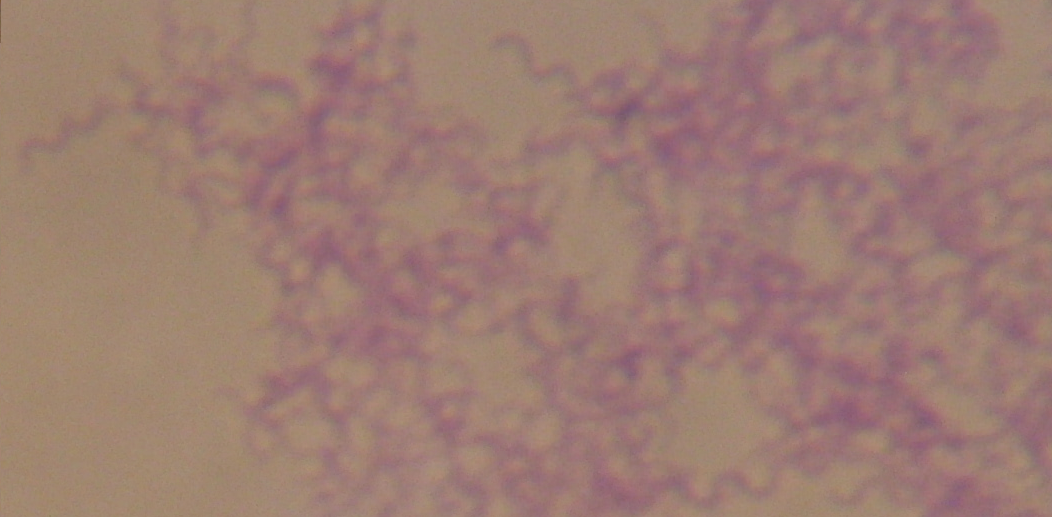
The purple non-sulfur bacterium Rhodospirillum

==== Mechanism ====
Purple bacteria use cyclic electron transport driven by a series of redox reactions. Light-harvesting complexes surrounding a reaction centre (RC) harvest photons in the form of resonance energy, exciting chlorophyll pigments P870 or P960 located in the RC. Excited electrons are cycled from P870 to quinones Q_{A} and Q_{B}, then passed to cytochrome bc_{1}, cytochrome c_{2}, and back to P870. The reduced quinone Q_{B} attracts two cytoplasmic protons and becomes QH_{2}, eventually being oxidized and releasing the protons to be pumped into the periplasm by the cytochrome bc_{1} complex. The resulting charge separation between the cytoplasm and periplasm generates a proton motive force used by ATP synthase to produce ATP energy.

=== Electron donors for anabolism ===
Purple bacteria are anoxygenic because they do not use water as electron donor to produce oxygen. Purple sulfur bacteria (PSB), use sulfide, sulfur, thiosulfate or hydrogen as electron donors. In addition, some species use ferrous iron as electron donor and one strain of Thiocapsa can use nitrite. Finally, even if the purple sulfur bacteria are typically photoautotrophic, some of them are photoheterotrophic and use different carbon sources and electron donors such as organic acids. Purple nonsulfur bacteria typically use hydrogen as an electron donor, but can also use sulfide at lower concentrations compared to PSB and some species can use thiosulfate or ferrous iron as electron donor. In contrast to the purple sulfur bacteria, the purple nonsulfur bacteria are mostly photoheterotrophic and can use a variety of organic compounds as both electron donor and carbon source, such as sugars, amino acids, organic acids, and aromatic compounds like toluene or benzoate.

Purple bacteria lack external electron carriers to spontaneously reduce NAD(P)^{+} to NAD(P)H, so they must use their reduced quinones to endergonically reduce NAD(P)^{+}. This process is driven by the proton motive force and is called reverse electron flow.

== Ecology ==
=== Distribution ===
Purple bacteria inhabit illuminated anoxic aquatic and terrestrial environments. Even if sometimes the two major groups of purple bacteria, purple sulfur bacteria and purple nonsulfur bacteria, coexist in the same habitat, they occupy different niches. Purple sulfur bacteria are strong photoautotrophs and are not adapted to an efficient metabolism and growth in the dark. On the other hand, purple nonsulfur bacteria are strong photoheterotrophs, even if they are capable of photoautotrophy, and are equipped for living in dark environments. Purple sulfur bacteria can be found in different ecosystems with enough sulfate and light, for example shallow lagoons polluted by sewage or deep waters of lakes, in which they could even bloom. They can also be found in microbial mats where the lower layer decomposes and sulfate reduction occurs.

Purple nonsulfur bacteria can be found in both illuminated and dark environments with lack of sulfide. However, they hardly form blooms with sufficiently high concentration to be visible without enrichment techniques.

Purple bacteria have evolved effective strategies for photosynthesis in extreme environments, and are quite successful in harsh habitats. In the 1960s the first halophiles and acidophiles of the genus Ectothiorhodospira were discovered. In the 1980s Thermochromatium tepidum, a thermophilic purple bacterium that can be found in North American hot springs, was isolated for the first time.

=== Biogeochemical cycles ===
Purple bacteria are involved in the biogeochemical cycles of different nutrients. In fact they are able to photoautotrophically fix carbon, or to consume it photoheterotrophically; in both cases in anoxic conditions. However the most important role is played by consuming hydrogen sulfide: a highly toxic substance for plants, animals and other bacteria. The oxidation of hydrogen sulfide by purple bacteria produces non-toxic forms of sulfur, such as elemental sulfur and sulfate.

In addition, almost all non-sulfur purple bacteria are able to fix nitrogen (N_{2} + 8 H^{+} → 2 NH_{3} + H_{2}), and Rhodopseudomonas sphaeroides, an alpha proteobacter, is capable of reducing nitrate to molecular nitrogen by denitrification.

=== Ecological niches ===
==== Quantity and quality of light ====
Several studies have shown that a strong accumulation of phototrophic sulfur bacteria has been observed between 2 and 20 meters (6 ft 7 in and 65 ft 7 in) deep, in some cases even 30 m (98 ft), of pelagic environments. This is due to the fact that in some environments the light transmission for various populations of phototrophic sulfur bacteria varies with a density from 0.015 to 10% Furthermore, Chromatiaceae have been found in chemocline environments over 20 m (66 ft) depths. The correlation between anoxygenic photosynthesis and the availability of solar radiation suggests that light is the main factor controlling all the activities of phototrophic sulfur bacteria. The density of pelagic communities of phototrophic sulfur bacteria extends beyond a depth range of 10 cm (3.9 in), while the less dense population (found in the Black Sea (0.068–0.94 μg BChle/dm^{3}) is scattered over an interval of 30 m (98 ft). Communities of phototrophic sulfur bacteria located in the coastal sediments of sandy, saline, or muddy beaches live in an environment with a higher light gradient, limiting growth to the highest value between 1.5–5 mm (1/16–3/16 in) of the sediments. At the same time, biomass densities of 900 mg bacteriochlorophyll/dm^{−3} can be attained in these latter systems.

==== Temperature and salinity ====
Purple sulfur bacteria (like green sulfur bacteria) typically form blooms in non-thermal aquatic ecosystems, but some members have been found in hot springs. For example Chlorobaculum tepidum can only be found in some hot springs in New Zealand at a pH value between 4.3 and 6.2 and at a temperature above 56 °C (133 °F). Another example, Thermochromatium tepidum, has been found in several hot springs in western North America at temperatures above 58 °C (136 °F) and may represent the most thermophilic extant Pseudomonadota. Of the purple sulfur bacteria, many members of the Chromatiaceae family are often found in fresh water and marine environments. About 10 species of Chromatiaceae are halophilic.

==== Syntrophy and symbioses ====
Like green sulfur bacteria, purple sulfur bacteria are also capable of symbiosis and can rapidly create stable associations between other purple sulfur bacteria and sulfur- or sulfate-reducing bacteria. These associations are based on a cycle of sulfur but not carbon compounds. Thus, a simultaneous growth of two bacterial partners takes place, which are fed by the oxidation of organic carbon and light substrates. Experiments with Chromatiaceae have pointed out that cell aggregates consisting of sulfate-reducing proteobacterium Desulfocapsa thiozymogenes and small cells of Chromatiaceae have been observed in the chemocline of an alpine meromictic lake.

== History ==
Purple bacteria were the first bacteria discovered to photosynthesize without having an oxygen byproduct. Instead, their byproduct is sulfur. This was demonstrated by first establishing the bacteria's reactions to different concentrations of oxygen. It was found that the bacteria moved quickly away from even the slightest trace of oxygen. Then a dish of the bacteria was taken, and a light was focused on one part of the dish, leaving the rest dark. As the bacteria cannot survive without light, all the bacteria moved into the circle of light, becoming very crowded. If the bacteria's byproduct was oxygen, the distances between individuals would become larger and larger as more oxygen was produced. But because of the bacteria's behavior in the focused light, it was concluded that the bacteria's photosynthetic byproduct could not be oxygen.

In a 2018 Frontiers in Energy Research article, it has been suggested that purple bacteria can be used as a biorefinery.

== Evolution ==
Researchers have theorized that some purple bacteria are related to the mitochondria, symbiotic bacteria in plant and animal cells today that act as organelles. Comparisons of their protein structure suggests that there is a common ancestor.

== See also ==
- Purple Earth hypothesis
