= Rhodomicrobium udaipurense =

Scientific classification
- Domain: Bacteria
- Kingdom: Pseudomonadati
- Phylum: Pseudomonadota
- Class: Alphaproteobacteria
- Order: Hyphomicrobiales
- Family: Hyphomicrobiaceae
- Genus: Rhodomicrobium
- Species: R. udaipurense

Binomial name
- Rhodomicrobium udaipurense Ramana et al. 2013

Type strain
- KCTC 15219, NBRC 109057, JA755

Species of bacterium

Rhodomicrobium udaipurense is a gram-negative, facultatively anaerobic, phototrophic, psychrotolerant bacterium from the genus Rhodomicrobium, which was isolated from a freshwater stream.
