= Winogradsky column =

Device for culturing microorganisms

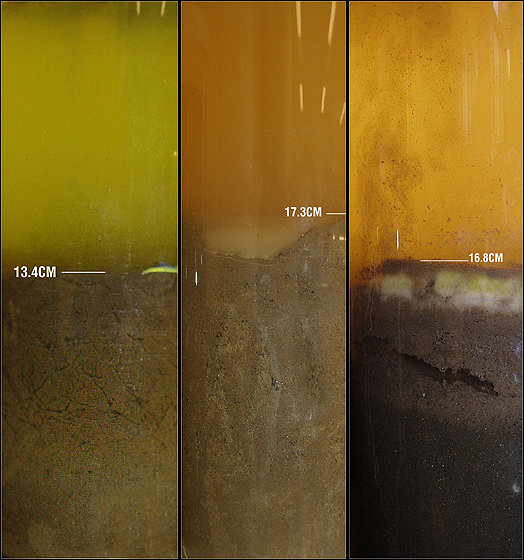
This picture depicts the initial appearance of three different Winogradsky columns. They are soil and water samples from a river, the later two columns have been modified with phosphate, nitrate, sulfur and oxygen additives. These additions promote the growth of various bacteria specific to the anaerobic and aerobic regions of the column.

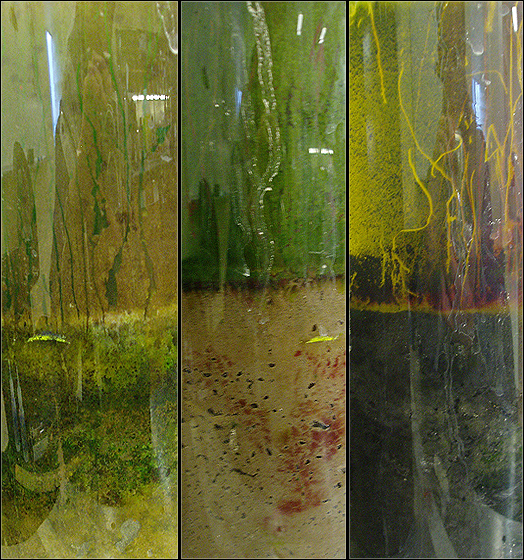
Shown above as a result of a 7-week period where the columns have been allowed to grow algae, cyanobacteria and other bacterial colonies. Of specific interest are the red regions of the middle column, indicative of purple non-sulfur bacteria (e.g. Rhodospirillaceae). Also, in column three, the red growth along the side of the column: a purple sulfur bacterium, Chromatium.

The Winogradsky column is a simple device for culturing a large diversity of microorganisms. Invented in the 1880s by Sergei Winogradsky, the device is a column of pond mud and water mixed with a carbon source such as newspaper (containing cellulose), egg-shells (containing calcium carbonate), and a sulfur source such as calcium sulfate or whole blended eggs. Incubating the column in sunlight for months results in an aerobic/anaerobic gradient as well as a sulfide gradient. These two gradients promote the growth of different microorganisms such as Clostridium, Desulfovibrio, Chlorobium, Chromatium, Rhodomicrobium, and Beggiatoa, as well as many other species of bacteria, cyanobacteria, and even some eukaryotes.

The column provides numerous gradients, depending on additive nutrients, from which the variety of aforementioned organisms can grow. The aerobic water phase and anaerobic mud or soil phase are one such distinction. Because of oxygen's low solubility in water, the water quickly becomes anoxic towards the interface of the mud and water. Anaerobic phototrophs are still present to a large extent in the mud phase, and there is still capacity for biofilm creation and colony expansion. Algae and other aerobic phototrophs are present along the surface and water of the upper half of the columns.

== Construction ==
The column is a rough mixture of ingredients – exact measurements are not critical. A tall glass (30 cm long, >5 cm wide) is filled one third full of pond mud, omitting any sticks, debris, and air bubbles. Supplementation of ~0.25% w/w calcium carbonate and ~0.50% w/w calcium sulfate or sodium sulfate is required (ground eggshell and egg yolk respectively are rich in these minerals), mixed in with some shredded newspaper, filter paper or hay (for cellulose). An additional anaerobic layer, this time of unsupplemented mud, brings the container to two thirds full. Alternatively, some procedures call for sand to be used for the layer above the enriched sediment as to allow for easier observation and sampling of resulting populations. This is followed by water from the pond to saturate the mud (or sand) and occupy half the remaining volume. The column is sealed tightly to prevent evaporation of water and incubated for several months in strong natural light.

After the column is sealed tightly the anaerobic bacteria will develop first, including Clostridium spp. These anaerobic bacteria will consume the cellulose as an energy source. Once this commences they create CO_{2} that is used by other bacteria and thus the cycle begins. Eventually colour layers of different bacteria will appear in the column. At the bottom of the column will be the black anaerobic H_{2}S dominated zone with sulfur-reducing bacteria; the layer above will be green sulfur photosynthetic anaerobic bacteria; then the layer will be purple which is sulfur anaerobic bacteria; followed by another column of purple anaerobic non-sulfur bacteria; and at the top will be a layer of Cyanobacteria which are sulfur oxidising bacteria. This top layer of aerobic bacteria produces O_{2} which feeds back into the column to facilitate further reactions.

While the Winogradsky column is an excellent tool to see whole communities of bacteria, it does not allow one to see the densities or individual bacterial colonies. It also takes a long time to complete its cycle. However its importance in environmental microbiology should not be overlooked and it is still an excellent tool to determine the major bacterial communities in a sample before committing to molecular taxonomy methods such as shotgun sequencing.
