= Chlorosome =

Membrane-associated antenna complex

Bacteriochlorophyll c-binding protein

Identifiers
- Symbol: Bac_chlorC
- Pfam: PF02043
- InterPro: IPR001470
- CATH: 2k37
Available protein structures:
- PDB: IPR001470 PF02043 (ECOD; PDBsum)
- AlphaFold: IPR001470; PF02043
- Alternative name: Chlorosome envelope protein A (CsmA)

Chlorosome envelope protein B

Identifiers
- Symbol: CsmB
- Pfam: PF27499
- InterPro: IPR059980
Available protein structures:
- PDB: IPR059980 PF27499 (ECOD; PDBsum)
- AlphaFold: IPR059980; PF27499

Chlorosome envelope protein C

Identifiers
- Symbol: CsmC
- Pfam: PF11098
- InterPro: IPR020995
Available protein structures:
- PDB: IPR020995 PF11098 (ECOD; PDBsum)
- AlphaFold: IPR020995; PF11098

Chlorosome envelope protein H

Identifiers
- Symbol: CsmH
- InterPro: IPR017845
Available protein structures:
- PDB: IPR017845
- AlphaFold: IPR017845

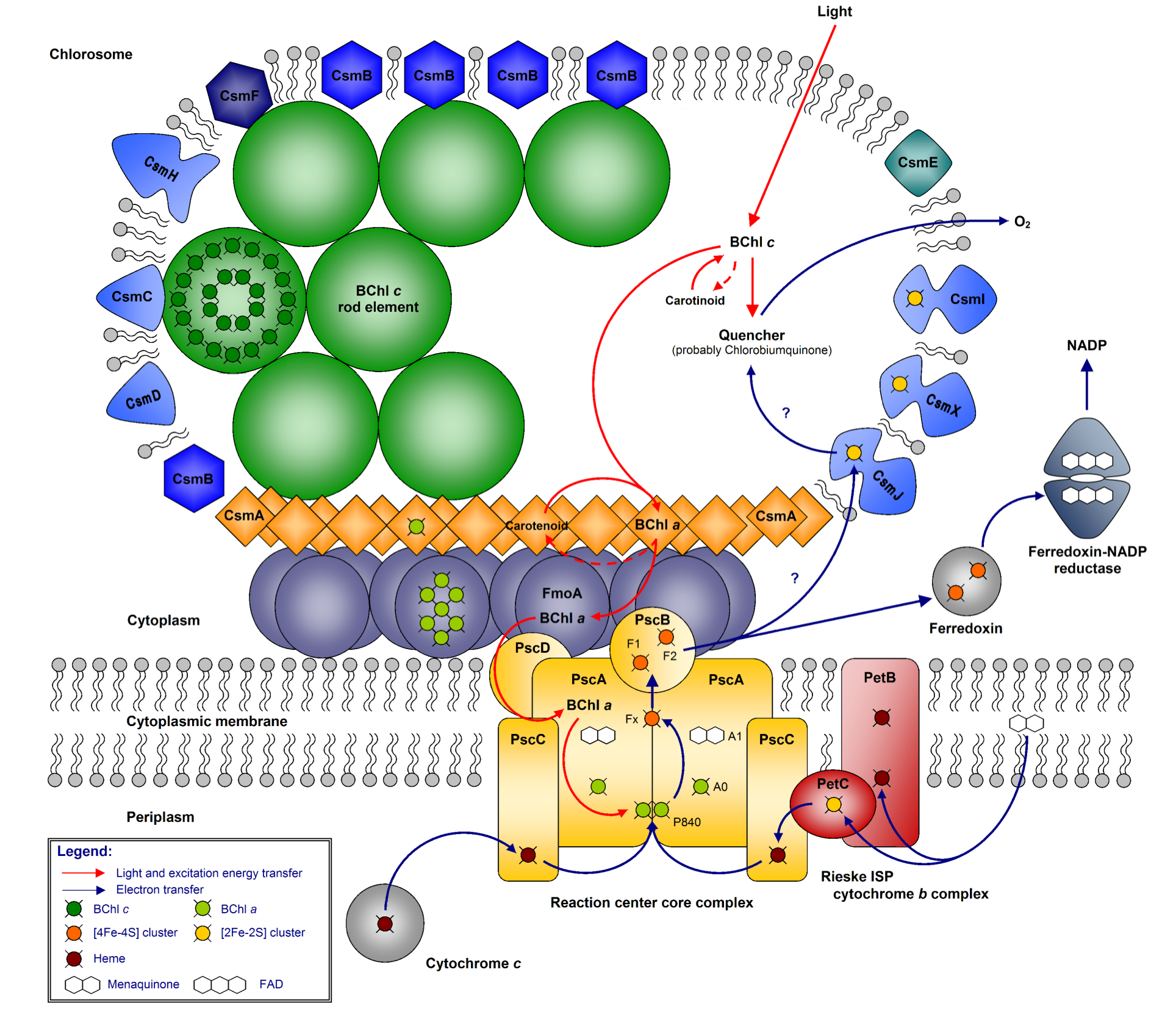
Schematic of the chlorosome (rod hypothesis)

A chlorosome is a light-harvesting complex found in green sulfur bacteria (GSB) and many green non-sulfur bacteria (GNsB), together known as green bacteria. It is a type of chromatophore, an organelle found in photosynthetic bacteria (e.g. purple bacteria). Chlorosomes are ellipsoidal bodies. They differ from other antenna complexes by their large size and lack of protein matrix supporting the photosynthetic pigments.

Green sulfur bacteria are a group of organisms that generally live in extremely low-light environments, such as at depths of 100 metres in the Black Sea. The ability to capture light energy and rapidly deliver it to where it needs to go is essential to these bacteria, some of which see only a few photons of light per chlorophyll per day. To achieve this, the bacteria contain chlorosome structures, which contain up to 250,000 chlorophyll molecules. In GSB, their length varies from 100 to 200 nm, width of 50–100 nm and height of 15–30 nm; in GNsB, the chlorosomes are somewhat smaller.

== Structure ==
Chlorosome shape can vary between species, with some species containing ellipsoidal shaped chlorosomes and others containing conical or irregular shaped chlorosomes. Inside green sulfur bacteria, the chlorosomes are attached to type-I reaction centers in the cell membrane via FMO-proteins and a chlorosome baseplate composed of CsmA proteins. Filamentous anoxygenic phototrophs of the phylum Chloroflexota lack the FMO complex, but instead use a protein complex called B808-866. Unlike the FMO proteins in green sulfur bacteria, B808-866 proteins are embedded in the cytoplasmic membrane and surround type-II reaction centers, providing the link between the reaction centers and the baseplate.

The composition of the chlorosomes is mostly bacteriochlorophyll (BChl) with small amounts of carotenoids and quinones surrounded by a galactolipid monolayer. In Chlorobi, chlorosome monolayers can contain up to eleven different proteins. The proteins of Chlorobi are the ones currently best understood in terms of structure and function. These proteins are named CsmA through CsmF, CsmH through CsmK, and CsmX. Other Csm proteins with different letter suffixes can be found in Chloroflexota and Ca. "Chloracidobacterium".

Within the chlorosome, the thousands of BChl pigment molecules have the ability to self assemble with each other, meaning they do not interact with protein scaffolding complexes for assembly. These pigments self assemble in lamellar structures about 10-30 nm wide.

=== Organization of the light harvesting pigments ===
Bacteriochlorophyll and carotenoids are two molecules responsible for harvesting light energy. Current models of the organization of bacteriochlorophyll and carotenoids (the main constituents) inside the chlorosomes have put them in a lamellar organization, where the long farnesol tails of the bacteriochlorophyll intermix with carotenoids and each other, forming a structure resembling a lipid multilayer.

Recently, another study has determined the organization of the bacteriochlorophyll molecules in green sulfur bacteria. Because they have been so difficult to study, the chlorosomes in green sulfur bacteria are the last class of light-harvesting complexes to be characterized structurally by scientists. Each individual chlorosome has a unique organization and this variability in composition had prevented scientists from using X-ray crystallography to characterize the internal structure. To get around this problem, the team used a combination of different experimental approaches. Genetic techniques to create a mutant bacterium with a more regular internal structure, cryo-electron microscopy to identify the larger distance constraints for the chlorosome, solid-state nuclear magnetic resonance (NMR) spectroscopy to determine the structure of the chlorosome's component chlorophyll molecules, and modeling to bring together all of the pieces and create a final picture of the chlorosome.

To create the mutant, three genes were inactivated that green sulfur bacteria acquired late in their evolution. In this way it was possible to go backward in evolutionary time to an intermediate state with much less variable and better ordered chlorosome organelles than the wild-type. The chlorosomes were isolated from the mutant and the wild-type forms of the bacteria. Cryo-electron microscopy was used to take pictures of the chlorosomes. The images reveal that the chlorophyll molecules inside chlorosomes have a nanotube shape. The team then used MAS NMR spectroscopy to resolve the microscopic arrangement of chlorophyll inside the chlorosome. With distance constraints and DFT ring current analyses, the organization was found to consist of unique syn-anti monomer stacking. The combination of NMR, cryo-electron microscopy and modeling enabled the scientists to determine that the chlorophyll molecules in green sulfur bacteria are arranged in helices. In the mutant bacteria, the chlorophyll molecules are positioned at a nearly 90-degree angle in relation to the long axis of the nanotubes, whereas the angle is less steep in the wild-type organism. The structural framework can accommodate disorder to improve the biological light harvesting function, which implies that a less ordered structure has a better performance.

== An alternative energy source ==
The interactions that lead to the assembly of the chlorophylls in chlorosomes are rather simple and the results may one day be used to build artificial photosynthetic systems that convert solar energy to electricity or biofuel.

== List of bacterial taxa containing chlorosomes ==
List adapted from, Figure 1.

- Phylum Chlorobiota ("green sulfur bacteria"), in full. Example genera:
  - Chlorobium
  - Pelodictyon
  - Prostecochloris
- Phylum Chloroflexota, class Chloroflexia ("green non-sulfur bacteria"), suborder Chloroflexineae, in full.
  - Family Chloroflexineae. Example genera:
    - Chloroflexus
    - Chloronema
  - Family Oscillochloridaceae. Example genera:
    - Oscillochloris
- Species Chloracidobacterium thermophilum. This is the only Acidobacterium known to make a chlorosome. (Proposed in 2021 to be split into three species of different temperature preference by sequence similarity.)
