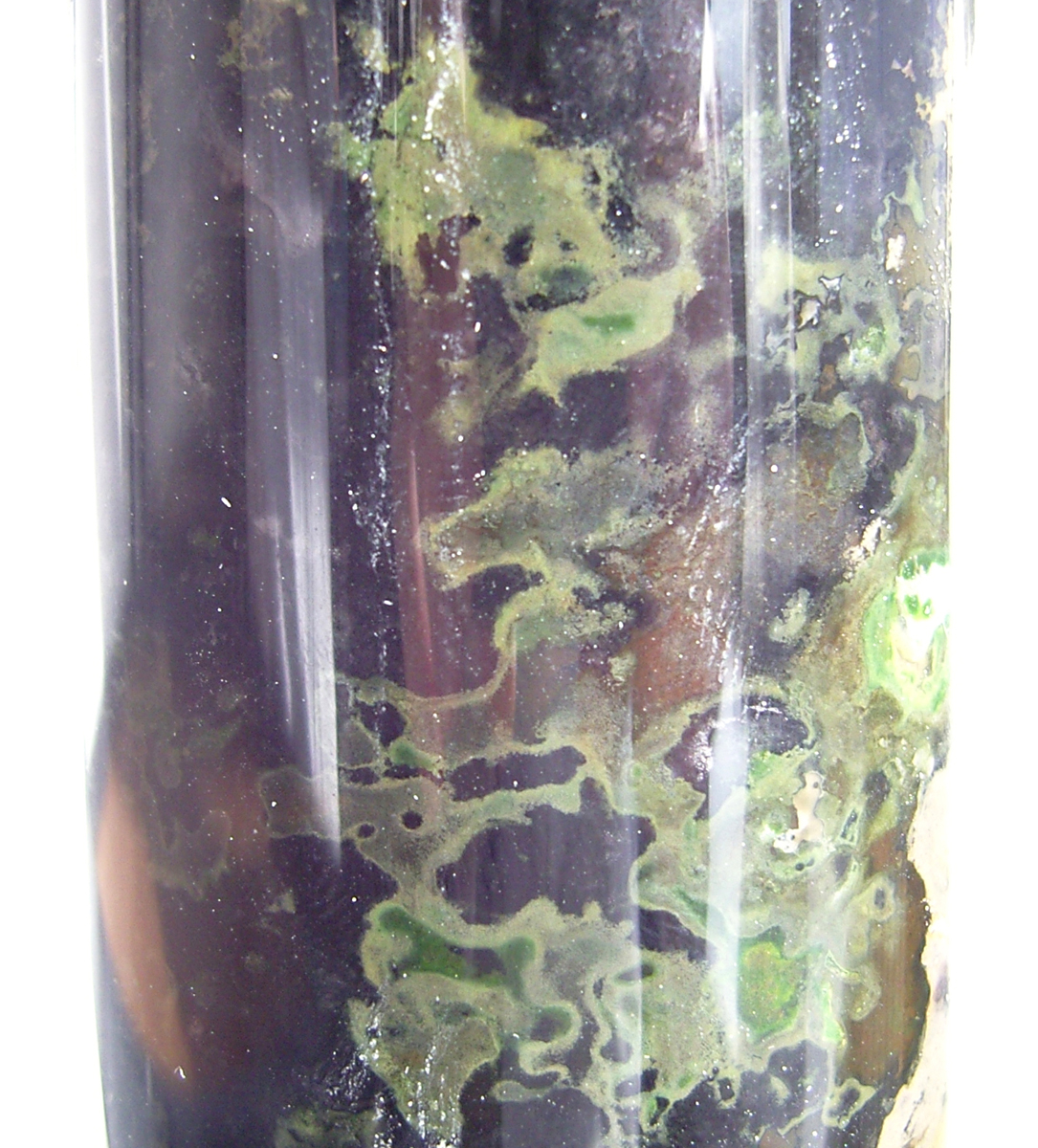
- Green sulfur bacteria in a Winogradsky column

Scientific classification
- Domain: Bacteria
- Kingdom: Pseudomonadati
- Phylum: Chlorobiota; Iino et al. 2021
- Class: Chlorobiia; Garrity and Holt 2001
- Order: Chlorobiales; Gibbons and Murray 1978 (Approved Lists 1980)

Families
- Chlorobiaceae; "Chloroherpetaceae"; "Thermochlorobacteriaceae"

Synonyms
- Chlorobiota: Chlorobi Iino et al. 2010; "Chlorobi" Garrity and Holt 2001; "Chlorobaeota" Oren et al. 2015; "Chlorobiota" Whitman et al. 2018; Chlorobiota: "Chlorobia" Whitman et al. 2018; Chlorobea Cavalier-Smith 2002; "Chlorobiia" Cavalier-Smith 2020; Chlorobiales: "Chlorobiales" Garrity and Holt 2001

= Green sulfur bacteria =

Phylum of bacteria

The green sulfur bacteria are a phylum, Chlorobiota, of obligately anaerobic photoautotrophic bacteria that metabolize sulfur.

Green sulfur bacteria are nonmotile (except Chloroherpeton thalassium, which may glide) and capable of anoxygenic photosynthesis. They live in anaerobic aquatic environments. In contrast to plants, green sulfur bacteria mainly use sulfide ions as electron donors. They are autotrophs that utilize the reverse tricarboxylic acid cycle to perform carbon fixation. They are also mixotrophs and reduce nitrogen.

== Characteristics ==
Green sulfur bacteria are gram-negative rod or spherical shaped bacteria. Some types of green sulfur bacteria have gas vacuoles that allow for movement. They are photolithoautotrophs, and use light energy and reduced sulfur compounds as the electron source. Electron donors include H_{2}, H_{2}S, S. The major photosynthetic pigment in these bacteria is Bacteriochlorophylls c or d in green species and e in brown species, and is located in the chlorosomes and plasma membranes. Chlorosomes are a unique feature that allow them to capture light in low-light conditions.

== Habitat ==
The majority of green sulfur bacteria are mesophilic, preferring moderate temperatures, and all live in aquatic environments. They require anaerobic conditions and reduced sulfur; they are usually found in the top millimeters of sediment. They are capable of photosynthesis in low light conditions.

The Black Sea, an extremely anoxic environment, was found to house a large population of green sulfur bacteria at about 100 m depth. Due to the lack of light available in this region of the sea, most bacteria were photosynthetically inactive. The photosynthetic activity detected in the sulfide chemocline suggests that the bacteria need very little energy for cellular maintenance.

A species of green sulfur bacteria has been found living near a black smoker off the coast of Mexico at a depth of 2,500 m in the Pacific Ocean. At this depth, the bacterium, designated GSB1, lives off the dim glow of the thermal vent since no sunlight can penetrate to that depth.

Green sulfur bacteria has also been found living on coral reef colonies in Taiwan, they make up the majority of a "green layer" on these colonies. They likely play a role in the coral system, and there could be a symbiotic relationship between the bacteria and the coral host. The coral could provide an anaerobic environment and a source of carbon for the bacteria. The bacteria can provide nutrients and detoxify the coral by oxidizing sulfide.

One type of green sulfur bacteria, Chlorobaculum tepidum, has been found in sulfur springs. These organisms are thermophilic, unlike most other green sulfur bacteria.

== Phylogeny ==
16S rRNA based LTP_10_2024

- Chlorobiaceae
  - Chloroherpeton thalassium
  - - Chlorobium phaeovibrioides
    - - - Prosthecochloris
          - P. marina
          - - P. aestuarii
            - P. vibrioformis
      - - - Pelodictyon clathratiforme (Szafer 1911) Lauterborn 1913
          - Chlorobium phaeobacteroides
        - - Chlorobium limicola (type sp.)
          - - Chlorobium luteolum
            - - Chlorobaculum
                - C. thiosulfatiphilum
                - - C. tepidum
                  - - "C. chlorovibrioides" (Gorlenko et al. 1974) Imhoff 2003
                    - C. parvum

120 marker proteins based GTDB 10-RS226

- - - "Thermochlorobacteraceae"
      "Ca. Thermochlorobacter aerophilum" Liu et al. 2012b
  - - "Chloroherpetaceae"
      Chloroherpeton thalassium Gibson et al. 1985
    - Chlorobiaceae
      - - Prosthecochloris
          - P. marina Bryantseva et al. 2020
          - - P. vibrioformis (Pelsh 1936) Imhoff 2003
            - - P. aestuarii Gorlenko 1970 (type sp.)
              - "P. ethylica" Shaposhnikov, Kondrateva & Federov 1959 ex Kyndt, Van Beeumen & Meyer 2020
      - - Chlorobaculum
          - C. parvum Imhoff 2003
          - - C. tepidum (Wahlund et al. 1996) Imhoff 2003 (type sp.)
            - - C. limnaeum Imhoff 2003
              - C. thiosulfatiphilum Imhoff 2022
        - Chlorobium
          - - C. luteolum (Schmidle 1901) emend. Imhoff 2003
            - - "C. antarcticum" Panwar et al. 2021
              - C. phaeovibrioides Pfennig 1968
          - - - C. limicola Nadson 1906 emend. Imhoff 2003 (type sp.)
              - C. phaeobacteroides Pfennig 1968
            - - - "C. chlorochromatii" Meschner 1957 ex Vogl et al. 2006
                - C. clathratiforme (Szafer 1911) Imhoff 2003
              - - "C. ferrooxidans" Heising et al. 1998
                - "Ca. C. masyuteum" Lambrecht et al. 2021

=== Taxonomy ===
- Family Chlorobiaceae Copeland 1956 ["Chlorobacteriaceae" Geitler & Pascher 1925]
  - ?Ancalochloris Gorlenko and Lebedeva 1971
  - Chlorobaculum Imhoff 2003
  - Chlorobium Nadson 1906
  - ?"Chloroplana" Dubinina and Gorlenko 1975
  - ?"Clathrochloris" Geitler 1925
  - Prosthecochloris Gorlenko 1970
- Family "Chloroherpetaceae" corrig. Bello et al. 2022
  - Chloroherpeton Gibson et al. 1985
- Family "Thermochlorobacteriaceae" corrig. Liu et al. 2012
  - "Ca. Thermochlorobacter" Liu et al. 2012

=== Specific characteristics of genera ===
Green sulfur bacteria are family Chlorobiaceae. There are four genera; Chloroherpeton, Prosthecochloris, Chlorobium and Chlorobaculum. Characteristics used to distinguish between these genera include some metabolic properties, pigments, cell morphology and absorption spectra. However, it is difficult to distinguish these properties and therefore the taxonomic division is sometimes unclear.

Generally, Chlorobium are rod or vibroid shaped and some species contain gas vesicles. They can develop as single or aggregate cells. They can be green or dark brown. The green strains use photosynthetic pigments Bchl c or d with chlorobactene carotenoids and the brown strains use photosynthetic pigment Bchl e with isorenieratene carotenoids. Low amounts of salt are required for growth.

Prosthecochloris are made up of vibroid, ovid or rod shaped cells. They start as single cells that form appendages that do not branch, referred to as non-branching prosthecae. They can also form gas vesicles. The photosynthetic pigments present include Bchl c, d or e. Furthermore, salt is necessary for growth.

Chlorobaculum develop as single cells and are generally vibroid or rod-shaped. Some of these can form gas vesicles. The photosynthetic pigments in this genus are Bchl c, d or e. Some species require NaCl (sodium chloride) for growth. Members of this genus used to be a part of the genus Chlorobium, but have formed a separate lineage.

The genus Chloroherpeton is unique because members of this genus are motile. They are flexing long rods, and can move by gliding. They are green in color and contain the photosynthetic pigment Bchl c as well as γ-carotene. Salt is required for growth.

== Metabolism ==
=== Photosynthesis ===
The green sulfur bacteria use a Type I reaction center for photosynthesis. Type I reaction centers are the bacterial homologue of photosystem I (PSI) in plants and cyanobacteria. The GSB reaction centers contain bacteriochlorophyll a and are known as P840 reaction centers due to the excitation wavelength of 840 nm that powers the flow of electrons. In green sulfur bacteria, the reaction center is associated with a large antena complex called the chlorosome that captures and funnels light energy to the reaction center. The chlorosomes have a peak absorption in the far red region of the spectrum between 720 and 750 nm because they contain bacteriochlorophyll c, d and e. A protein complex called the Fenna-Matthews-Olson complex (FMO) is physically located between the chlorosomes and the P840 RC. The FMO complex helps efficiently transfer the energy absorbed by the antena to the reaction center.

PSI and Type I reaction centers are able to reduce ferredoxin (Fd), a strong reductant that can be used to reduce NAD^{+} and fix CO_{2}. Once the reaction center (RC) has given an electron to Fd, it becomes an oxidizing agent (P840^{+}) with a reduction potential of around +300 mV. While this is not positive enough to strip electrons from water to synthesize O_{2} (E_{0} = +820 mV), it can accept electrons from other sources like H_{2}S, thiosulphate or Fe^{2+} ions. This transport of electrons from donors like H_{2}S to the acceptor Fd is called linear electron flow, or linear electron transport. The oxidation of sulfide ions leads to the production of sulfur as a waste product that accumulates as globules on the extracellular side of the membrane. These globules of sulfur give green sulfur bacteria their name. When sulfide is depleted, the sulfur globules are consumed and further oxidized to sulfate. However, the pathway of sulfur oxidation is not well-understood.

Instead of passing the electrons onto Fd, the Fe-S clusters in the P840 reaction center can transfer the electrons to menaquinone (MQ:MQH_{2}) which returns the electrons to the P840^{+} via an electron transport chain (ETC). On the way back to the RC, the electrons from MQH_{2} pass through complex III (cytochrome bc_{1} complex) that pumps H^{+} ions across the membrane. The electrochemical potential of the protons across the membrane is used to synthesize ATP by the F_{o}F_{1} ATP synthase. This cyclic electron transport is responsible for converting light energy into cellular energy in the form of ATP.

=== Sulfur metabolism ===
Green sulfur bacteria oxidize inorganic sulfur compounds to use as electron donors for anaerobic photosynthesis, specifically in carbon dioxide fixation. They usually prefer to utilize sulfide over other sulfur compounds as an electron donor, however they can utilize thiosulfate or H_{2}. The intermediate is usually sulfur, which is deposited outside of the cell, and the end product is sulfate. The sulfur, which is deposited extracellularly, is in the form of sulfur globules, which can be later oxidized completely.

The mechanisms of sulfur oxidation in green sulfur bacteria are not well characterized. Some enzymes thought to be involved in sulfide oxidation include flavocytochrome c, sulfide:quinone oxidoreductase and the SO_{x} system. Flavocytochrome can catalyze the transfer of electrons to cytochromes from sulfide, and these cytochromes could then move the electrons to the photosynthetic reaction center. However, not all green sulfur bacteria produce this enzyme, demonstrating that it is not needed for the oxidation of sulfide. Sulfide:quinone oxidoreductase (SQR) also helps with electron transport, but, when alone, has been found to produce decreased rates of sulfide oxidation in green sulfur bacteria, suggesting that there is a different, more effective mechanism. However, most green sulfur bacteria contain a homolog of the SQR gene. The oxidation of thiosulfate to sulfate could be catalyzed by the enzymes in the SO_{x} system.

It is thought that the enzymes and genes related to sulfur metabolism were obtained via horizontal gene transfer during the evolution of green sulfur bacteria.

=== Carbon fixation ===
Green sulfur bacteria are photoautotrophs: they not only get energy from light, they can grow using carbon dioxide as their sole source of carbon. They fix carbon dioxide using the reverse tricarboxylic acid cycle (rTCA) cycle where energy is consumed to reduce carbon dioxide, rather than oxidize as seen in the forward TCA cycle, in order to synthesize pyruvate and acetate. These molecules are used as the raw materials to synthesize all the building blocks a cell needs to generate macromolecules. The rTCA cycle is highly energy efficient enabling the bacteria to grow under low light conditions. However it has several oxygen sensitive enzymes that limits its efficiency in aerobic conditions.

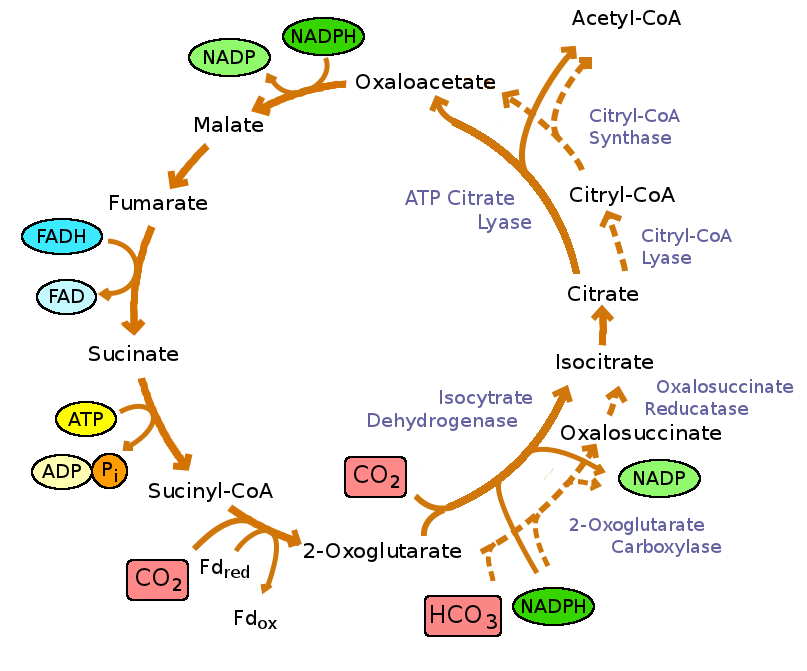
Reductive TCA Cycle Diagram

The reactions of reversal of the oxidative tricarboxylic acid cycle are catalyzed by four enzymes:

1. pyruvate:ferredoxin (Fd) oxidoreductase:
  acetyl-CoA + CO_{2} + 2Fdred + 2H+ ⇌ pyruvate + CoA + 2Fdox
2. ATP citrate lyase:
  ACL, acetyl-CoA + oxaloacetate + ADP + Pi ⇌ citrate + CoA + ATP
3. α-keto-glutarate:ferredoxin oxidoreductase:
  succinyl-CoA + CO_{2} + 2Fdred + 2H+ ⇌ α-ketoglutarate + CoA + 2Fdox
4. fumarare reductase
  succinate + acceptor ⇌ fumarate + reduced acceptor

However, the oxidative TCA cycle (OTCA) still is present in green sulfur bacteria. The OTCA can assimilate acetate, however the OTCA appears to be incomplete in green sulfur bacteria due to the location and down regulation of the gene during phototrophic growth.

=== Mixotrophy ===
Green sulfur bacteria are often referred to as obligate photoautotrophs as they cannot grow in the absence of light even if they are provided with organic matter. However they exhibit a form of mixotrophy where they can consume simple organic compounds in the presence of light and CO_{2}. In the presence of CO_{2} or HCO^{−}_{3}, some green sulfur bacteria can utilize acetate or pyruvate.

Mixotrophy in green sulfur bacteria is best modeled by the representative green sulfur bacterium Chlorobaculum tepidum. Mixotrophy occurs during amino acid biosynthesis/carbon utilization and energy metabolism. The bacterium uses electrons, generated from the oxidation of sulfur, and the energy it captures from light to run the rTCA. C. tepidum also exhibits use of both pyruvate and acetate as an organic carbon source.

An example of mixotrophy in C. tepidum that combines autotrophy and heterotrophy is in its synthesis of acetyl-CoA. C. tepidum can autotrophically generate acetyl-CoA through the rTCA cycle, or it can heterotrophically generate it from the uptake of acetate. Similar mixotrophic activity occurs when pyruvate is used for amino acid biosynthesis, but mixotrophic growth using acetate yields higher growth rates.

In energy metabolism, C. tepidum relies on light reactions to produce energy (NADPH and NADH) because the pathways typically responsible for energy production (oxidative pentose phosphate pathway and normal TCA cycle) are only partly functional. Photons absorbed from the light are used to produce NADPH and NADH, the cofactors of energy metabolism. C. tepidum also generates energy in the form of ATP using the proton motive force derived from sulfide oxidation. Energy production from both sulfide oxidation and photon absorption via bacteriochlorophylls.

=== Nitrogen fixation ===
The majority of green sulfur bacteria are diazotrophs: they can reduce nitrogen to ammonia which is then used to synthesize amino acids. Nitrogen fixation among green sulfur bacteria is generally typical of an anoxygenic phototroph, and requires the presence of light. Green sulfur bacteria exhibit activity from a Type-1 secretion system and a ferredoxin-NADP+ oxidoreductase to generate reduced iron, a trait that evolved to support nitrogen fixation. Like purple sulfur bacteria, they can regulate the activity of nitrogenase post-translationally in response to ammonia concentrations. Their possession of nif genes, even though evolutionarily distinct, may suggest their nitrogen fixation abilities arose in two different events or through a shared very distant ancestor.

Examples of green sulfur bacteria capable of nitrogen fixation include the genus Chlorobium and Pelodictyon, excluding P. phaeoclathratiforme. Prosthecochloris aestuarii and Chloroherpeton thalassium also fall into this category. Their N_{2} fixation is widespread and plays an important role in overall nitrogen availability for ecosystems. Green sulfur bacteria living in coral reefs, such as Prosthecochloris, are crucial in generating available nitrogen in the already nutrient-limited environment.

== See also ==
- Anoxic event
- Purple sulfur bacteria
- Green non-sulfur bacteria
