= Anoxygenic photosynthesis =

Process used by obligate anaerobes

Anoxygenic photosynthesis is a special form of photosynthesis used by some bacteria, which differs from the better known oxygenic photosynthesis in plants and cyanobacteria in the reductant used (e.g. hydrogen sulfide instead of water) and the byproduct generated (e.g. elemental sulfur instead of molecular oxygen).

Unlike oxygenic phototrophs that only use the Calvin cycle to fix carbon dioxide, anoxygenic phototrophs can use both the Calvin cycle and the reverse TCA cycle to fix carbon dioxide. Additionally, unlike its oxygenic counterpart that predominantly uses chlorophyll, this type of photosynthesis uses the bacteriochlorophyll (BChl) to utilize light as an energy source. A precursor to oxygenic photosynthesis but having been developed after chemolithoautotrophy, anoxygenic photosynthesis uses one of two reaction centers while oxygenic photosynthesis uses both type I and type II reaction centers.

== The rise of anoxygenic photosynthesis ==
Sulfide is used as a reducing agent during photosynthesis in green and sulfur bacteria.: 1. Energy in the form of sunlight; 2. The light dependent reactions take place when the light excites a reaction center, which donates an electron to another molecule and starts the electron transport chain to produce ATP and NADPH.; 3. Once NADPH has been produced, the Calvin cycle proceeds as in oxygenic photosynthesis, turning CO_{2} into glucose.

During the Archean Era on Earth, the atmosphere lacked or was limited in oxygen, was highly abundant in iron, and had harmful ultraviolet (UV) rays due to a lack of an ozone layer. Sedimentary rock records in the ocean have suggested that anoxygenic photosynthesis evolved before oxygenic photosynthesis. One of the lines of evidence that suggests that the bacteria present during the Archean era were anoxygenic is because there was a lack of ferric iron minerals. As ferric minerals were not present, this suggests that oxygenic photosynthesis was not occurring, and oxygen was not being produced (i.e. anoxygenic). Instead of oxygen being the electron donor in the anoxygenic photosynthesis chemical reaction, hydrogen sulfide has been suggested instead.

Serpentinizing hydrothermal vents have been present on the sea floor for 4.2 billion years, making it a long-standing Earth feature. Serpentinization, an ancient geochemical reaction within this feature, produces hydrogen-based compounds such as H_{2} and H_{2}S. Chemolithoautotrophy where carbon dioxide is reduced to simple organic matter using H_{2} as an electron reducer is thought to have been the main process of primary production in this system prior to photosynthesis being developed. This made hydrogen a limiting factor in primary production.

The electron transports chains found within anoxygenic photosynthetic bacteria involve cytochromes (heme) and quinones which are essential for the creation of chlorophyll (Chl). The biosynthesis of Chl is a pivotal step for the evolution of phototrophs. It is likely that the evolution of the critical photopigment developed in hydrothermal conditions where the ultraviolet rays that could be damaging to chlorophototrophs could not penetrate to that depth. The development of Chl helped lead to the development of two types of reaction centers (type I reaction center, RC1 & type II reaction center, RC 2). RC1 has been listed as a precursor to RC2, allowing for the for electrons to flow through ferredoxin, a small iron-sulfur protein, that transfers electrons and is in turn reduced to Fd_{red}. This process allowed for chlorophototrophs to use H_{2}S as an electron reducer, allowing for those organisms to move away from the dependency of H_{2}. However all anoxygenic phototrophs use either RC1 or RC2.

== Bacteria ==
Several groups of bacteria can conduct anoxygenic photosynthesis: green sulfur bacteria (GSB), Chloracidobacterium, heliobacteria, acidobacteriota, red and green filamentous phototrophs (FAPs e.g. Chloroflexia), and purple bacteria. Whereas the first four listed use RC1 the following two types of bacteria use RC 2. Possibly also some members of Myxococcota, as they have been found to possess a photosynthesis gene cluster encoding a type-II reaction center with all enzymes and proteins required for photosynthesis.

== Pigments ==
The photopigments used to carry out anaerobic photosynthesis are similar to chlorophyll but differ in molecular detail and peak wavelength of light absorbed.

Bacteriochlorophylls a through g absorb electromagnetic radiation maximally in the near-infrared within their natural membrane milieu. This differs from chlorophyll a, the predominant plant and cyanobacteria pigment, which has peak absorption wavelength approximately 100 nanometers shorter (in the red portion of the visible spectrum). Predominantly found in anaerobic bacteria, they can be a major pigment used for anoxygenic photosynthesis. The quantity of light and the type of light that is absorbed is dependent on 1) the type of organism and 2) where the bacteriochlorophyll is located within the membrane. Generally however, bacteriochlorophyll absorb light at a spectrum between 800 and 1040 nm, for instance, green sulfur bacteria use BChl c through e at a range between 720 and 755 nm.

== Reaction centers ==
There are two main types of anaerobic photosynthetic electron transport chains in bacteria. The type I reaction centers are found in GSB, Chloracidobacterium, and Heliobacteria, while the RC2 are found in FAPs and purple bacteria.

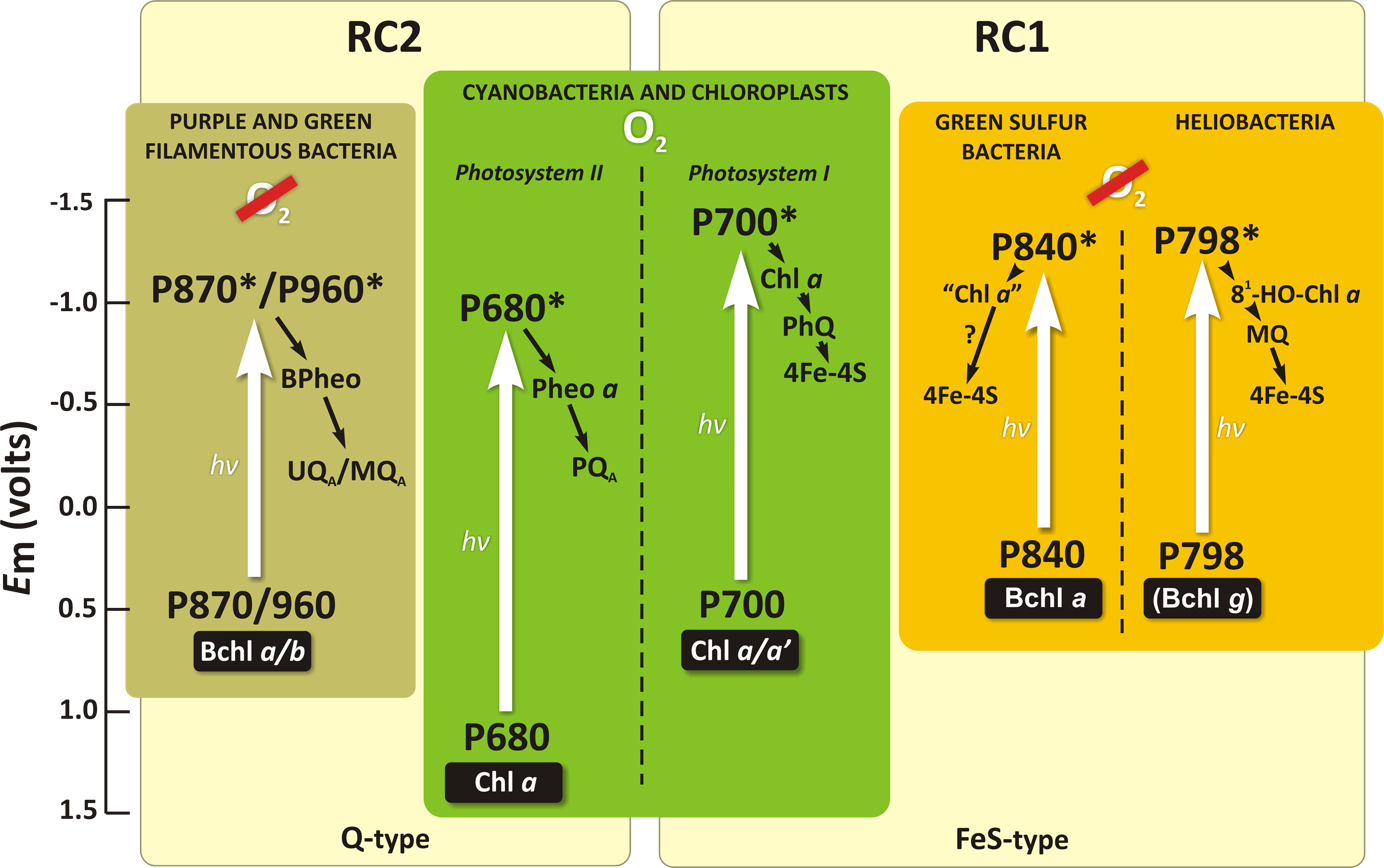
Different Reaction Centers (RC) for photosynthetic organisms. RC1 is Reaction Center 1 which includes green sulfur bacteria and heliobacteria while Reaction Center 2 includes purple and green filamentous bacteria. Variables such as P480 indicate the long wavelength absorption maxima for the electron donor (P). Other abbreviations include Chl which indicates Chlorophyll, BChl indicate bacteriophyll. Image by Govindjee and Dmitriy Shevela (2011). Licensed under the Creative Commons Attribution 3.0 Unported license.

=== Type I reaction centers ===
The electron transport chain of green sulfur bacteria—such as is present in the model organism Chlorobaculum tepidum—uses the reaction center bacteriochlorophyll pair, P800/P840. These photopigment work in tandem with BChl a and a ferredoxin protein to form a bifurcated chain where electrons can be transferred into multiple routes.

Specifically, P800/P840 act as electron donors that are passed to two BChls and two Chl which can act as electron acceptors and the ferredoxin cluster then acts as the terminal electron acceptor. When light is absorbed by the reaction center, P840 enters an excited state with a large negative reduction potential, and so readily donates the electrons to other bacteriochlrophylls and chlorophylls which passes it on down an electron transport chain. The electron is transferred through a series of electron carriers and complexes until it is used to reduce NAD^{+} to NADH. The separation of the electron via these different routes creates a potential energy difference across the membrane known as a proton gradient which in turn creates ATP, the energy molecule that is essential for essential functions in the cell. P840 regeneration is accomplished with the oxidation of a sulfide ion from hydrogen sulfide (or of hydrogen or ferrous iron) by cytochrome C_{555}.

=== Type II reaction centers ===
Although the type II reaction centers are structurally and sequentially analogous to photosystem II (PSII) in plant chloroplasts and cyanobacteria, known organisms that exhibit anoxygenic photosynthesis do not have a region analogous to the oxygen-evolving complex of PSII.

The electron transport chain of purple non-sulfur bacteria begins when the reaction center bacteriochlorophyll pair, P870, becomes excited from the absorption of light. Excited P870 will then donate an electron to bacteriopheophytin, which then passes it on to a series of electron carriers down the electron chain. In the process, it will generate an electrochemical gradient which can then be used to synthesize ATP. Molecular hydrogen in the bacterial environment is the usual electron donor.

== See also ==
- Purple Earth hypothesis
