= Bacteriochlorophyll =

Bacteriochlorophyll a

Names
- IUPAC name [methyl (3S,4S,13R,14R,21R)-9-acetyl-14-ethyl-4,8,13,18-tetramethyl-20-oxo-3-(3-oxo-3-([(2E,7R,11R)-3,7,11,15-tetramethylhexadec-2-en-1-yl]oxy)propyl)-13,14-dihydrophorbine-21-carboxylatato(2−)-kappa4N23,N24,N25,N26]magnesium

Identifiers
| CAS Number | 17499-98-8 |
| 3D model (JSmol) | Interactive image |
| ChEBI | CHEBI:30033 |
| ChemSpider | 21169457 |
| KEGG | C11242 |
| PubChem CID | 11953947 |
- InChI: InChI=1S/C55H75N4O6.Mg/c1-13-39-34(7)41-29-46-48(38(11)60)36(9)43(57-46)27-42-35(8)40(52(58-42)50-51(55(63)64-12)54(62)49-37(10)44(59-53(49)50)28-45(39)56-41)23-24-47(61)65-26-25-33(6)22-16-21-32(5)20-15-19-31(4)18-14-17-30(2)3;/h25,27-32,34-35,39-40,51H,13-24,26H2,1-12H3,(H-,56,57,58,59,60,62);/q-1;+2/p-1/b33-25+;/t31-,32-,34-,35+,39-,40+,51-;/m1./s1 Key: DSJXIQQMORJERS-AGGZHOMASA-M
- SMILES: CC[C@@H]1[C@@H](C)C2=N/C/1=C\c3c(C)c4C(=O)[C@H](C(=O)OC)\C\5=C/6\N=C(\C=C\7/N([Mg]n3c45)\C(=C/2)\C(=C7C)C(=O)C)[C@@H](C)[C@@H]6CCC(=O)OC\C=C(/C)\CCC[C@H](C)CCC[C@H](C)CCCC(C)C

Properties
| Chemical formula | MgC_{55}H_{74}N_{4}O_{6} |
| Molar mass | 911.524 g·mol^{−1} |
| Appearance | Light green to blue-green powder |
- Except where otherwise noted, data are given for materials in their standard state (at 25 °C [77 °F], 100 kPa). Infobox references

Bacteriochlorophylls (BChl) are photosynthetic pigments that occur in various phototrophic bacteria. They were discovered by C. B. van Niel in 1932. They are related to chlorophylls, which are the primary pigments in plants, algae, and cyanobacteria. Organisms that contain bacteriochlorophyll conduct photosynthesis to sustain their energy requirements, but the process is anoxygenic and does not produce oxygen as a byproduct. They use wavelengths of light not absorbed by plants or cyanobacteria. Replacement of Mg^{2+} with protons gives bacteriophaeophytin (BPh), the phaeophytin form.

List of major bacteriochlorophylls
| Pigment | Taxa | in vivo infrared absorption maximum (nm) |
|---|---|---|
| BChl a | Purple bacteria, Heliobacteria, Green sulfur bacteria, Chloroflexota, Chloracidobacterium thermophilum | 805, 830–890 |
| BChl b | Purple bacteria | 835–850, 1020–1040 |
| BChl c | Green sulfur bacteria, Chloroflexota, C. thermophilum, C. tepidum | 745–755 |
| BChl d | Green sulfur bacteria | 705–740 |
| BChl e | Green sulfur bacteria | 719–726 |
| BChl f | (Discovered by mutation of BChl e synthesis by analogy to BChl c/d. Not evolutionarily favorable.) | 700–710 |
| BChl g | Heliobacteria | 670, 788 |

Structures of major bacteriochlorophylls

bacteriochlorophyll a

bacteriochlorophyll b

bacteriochlorophyll c

bacteriochlorophyll d

bacteriochlorophyll e

bacteriochlorophyll f

bacteriochlorophyll g

== Structure ==
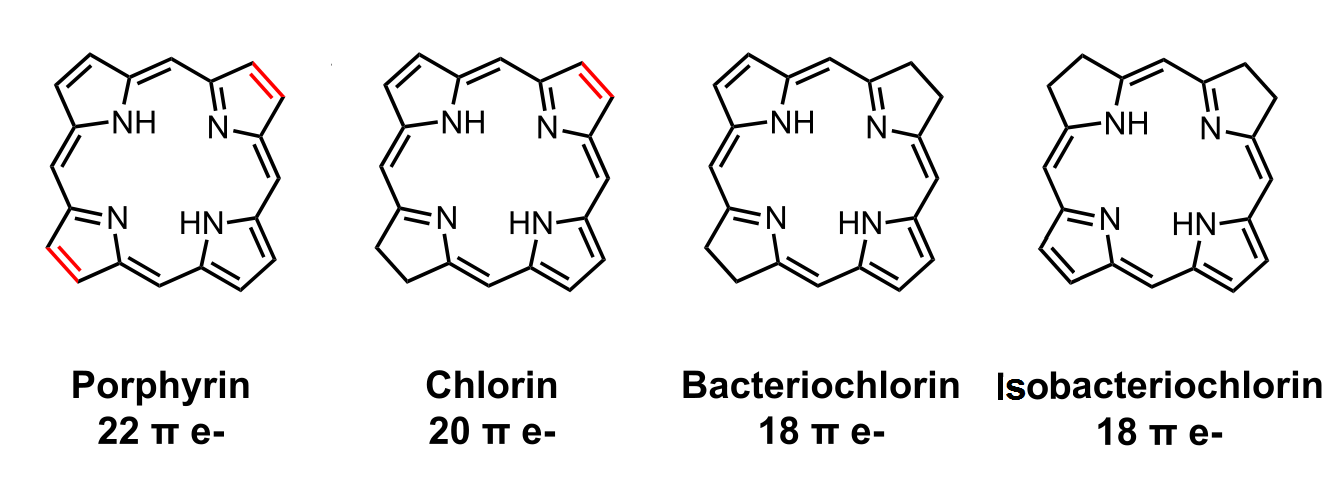
Chemical structures comparing porphin, chlorin, bacteriochlorin, and isobacteriochlorin. Note relocation of C=C double bond between the two bacteriochlorin isomers. There are two π electrons (symbolized by π e^{−}) for every double bond in the macrocycle.

Bacteriochlorophylls a, b, and g are bacteriochlorins, meaning their molecules have a bacteriochlorin macrocycle ring with two reduced pyrrole rings (B and D). Bacteriochlorophylls c, d, e, and f are chlorins, meaning their molecules have a chlorin macrocycle ring with one reduced pyrrole ring (D).

Bacteriochlorophylls c to f occur in the form of closely related homologs with different alkyl groups attached to pyrrole rings B and C and are illustrated above in their simplest versions, esterified with the sesquiterpene alcohol farnesol. Most of the variation occurs in the 8 and 12 positions and can be attributed to methyltransferase variation. BChl c_{S} is a term for 8-ethyl,12-methyl homolog of BChl c.

Bacteriochlorophyll g has a vinyl group in ring (A), at position 8.

== Biosynthesis ==
The common biosynthetic precursor for bacteriochlorophylls is chlorophyllide a

There are a large number of known bacteriochlorophylls but all have features in common since the biosynthetic pathway involves chlorophyllide a (Chlide a) as an intermediate.

Chlorin-cored BChls (c to f) are produced by a series of enzymatic modifications on the sidechain of Chlide a, much like how Chl b, d, e are made. The bacteriochlorin-cored BChls a, b, g require a unique step to reduce the double bond between C7 and C8, which is performed by chlorophyllide a reductase (COR).

Isobacteriochlorins, in contrast, are biosynthesised from uroporphyrinogen III in a separate pathway that leads, for example, to siroheme, cofactor F_{430} and cobalamin. The common intermediate is sirohydrochlorin.
