= Chloroplast =

Plant organelle that conducts photosynthesis

Structure of a typical higher-plant chloroplast. The green chlorophyll is contained in stacks of disk-like thylakoids.

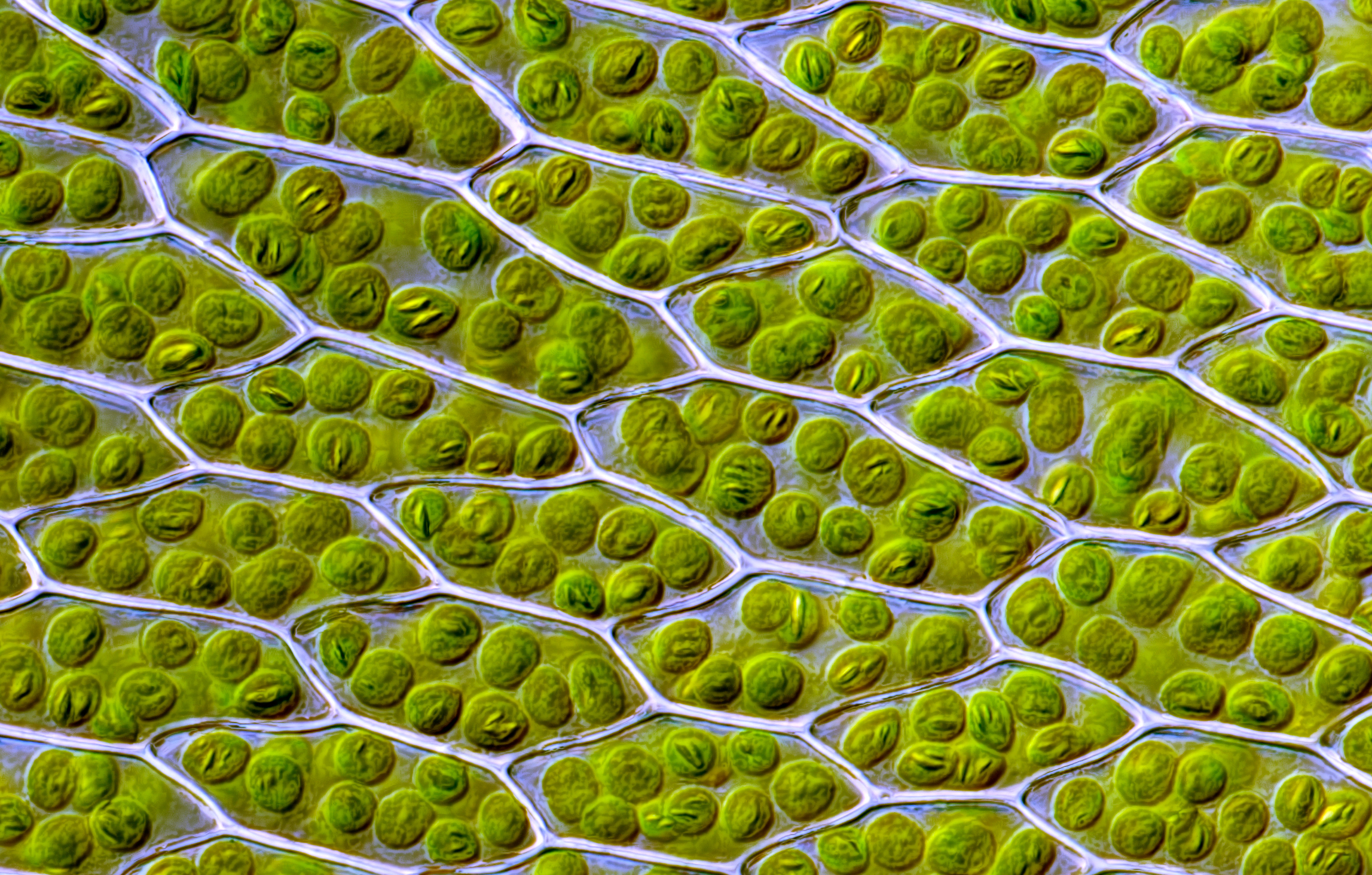
Chloroplasts, containing thylakoids, visible in the cells of Rosulabryum capillare, a type of moss

A chloroplast (/ˈklɔːrəˌplæst, -plɑːst/ KLOR-ə-plast, -plahst) is a type of organelle known as a plastid that conducts photosynthesis mostly in plant and algal cells. Chloroplasts have a high concentration of chlorophyll pigments which capture the energy from sunlight, convert it to chemical energy and decompose water to release oxygen. The chemical energy created is then used to make sugar and other organic molecules from carbon dioxide in the Calvin cycle. Chloroplasts carry out a number of other functions, including fatty acid synthesis, amino acid synthesis, and immune response in plants. The number of chloroplasts per cell varies from one, in some unicellular algae, up to 100 in plants like Arabidopsis and wheat.

Chloroplasts are highly dynamic - they circulate and are moved around within cells. Their behavior is strongly influenced by environmental factors, such as light color and intensity.

Chlroplasts are thought to have evolved from an ancient photosynthetic cyanobacterium ancestor that was engulfed by an early eukaryotic cell. Because of their endosymbiotic origins, chloroplasts, like mitochondria, contain their own DNA separate from that of the cell nucleus. Chloroplasts multiply by division, and cannot be made anew by the plant cell, but must be inherited by each daughter cell during cell division. With one exception (the amoeboid Paulinella chromatophora), all chloroplasts can be traced back to a single endosymbiotic event. Despite this, they can be found in extremely diverse organisms that are not directly related to each other—a consequence of many secondary and even tertiary endosymbiotic events.

== Discovery and etymology ==
The first definitive description of a chloroplast (Chlorophyllkörnen, "grain of chlorophyll") was given by Hugo von Mohl in 1837 as discrete bodies within the green plant cell. In 1883, Andreas Franz Wilhelm Schimper named these bodies as "chloroplastids" (Chloroplastida). In 1884, Eduard Strasburger adopted the term "chloroplasts" (Chloroplasten).

The word chloroplast is derived from the Greek words chloros (χλωρός), which means green, and plastes (πλάστης), which means "the one who forms".

== Endosymbiotic origin of chloroplasts ==
Chloroplasts are one of many types of organelles in photosynthetic eukaryotic cells. They evolved from cyanobacteria through a process called organellogenesis. Cyanobacteria are a diverse phylum of gram-negative bacteria capable of carrying out oxygenic photosynthesis. Like chloroplasts, they have thylakoids. The thylakoid membranes contain photosynthetic pigments, including chlorophyll a. This origin of chloroplasts was first suggested by the Russian biologist Konstantin Mereschkowski in 1905 after Andreas Franz Wilhelm Schimper observed in 1883 that chloroplasts closely resemble cyanobacteria. Chloroplasts are only found in plants, algae, and some species of the amoeboid Paulinella.

Mitochondria are thought to have come from a similar endosymbiosis event, where an aerobic prokaryote was engulfed.

=== Primary endosymbiosis ===
Primary endosymbiosis
A eukaryote with mitochondria engulfed a cyanobacterium in an event of serial primary endosymbiosis, creating a lineage of cells with both organelles.

Approximately two billion years ago, a free-living cyanobacterium entered an early eukaryotic cell, either as food or as an internal parasite, but managed to escape the phagocytic vacuole it was contained in and persist inside the cell. This event is called endosymbiosis, or "cell living inside another cell with a mutual benefit for both". The external cell is commonly referred to as the host while the internal cell is called the endosymbiont. The engulfed cyanobacteria provided an advantage to the host by providing sugar from photosynthesis. Over time, the cyanobacterium was assimilated, and many of its genes were lost or transferred to the nucleus of the host. Some of the cyanobacterial proteins were then synthesized by the host cell and imported back into the chloroplast (formerly the cyanobacterium), allowing the host to control the chloroplast.

Chloroplasts which can be traced back directly to a cyanobacterial ancestor (i.e. without a subsequent endosymbiotic event) are known as primary plastids ("plastid" in this context means almost the same thing as chloroplast). Chloroplasts that can be traced back to another photosynthetic eukaryotic endosymbiont are called secondary plastids or tertiary plastids (discussed below).

Whether primary chloroplasts came from a single endosymbiotic event or multiple independent engulfments across various eukaryotic lineages was long debated. It is now generally held that with one exception (the amoeboid Paulinella chromatophora), chloroplasts arose from a single endosymbiotic event around two billion years ago and these chloroplasts all share a single ancestor. It has been proposed that the closest living relative of the ancestral engulfed cyanobacterium is Gloeomargarita lithophora. Separately, somewhere about 90–140 million years ago, this process happened again in the amoeboid Paulinella with a cyanobacterium in the genus Prochlorococcus. This independently evolved chloroplast is often called a chromatophore instead of a chloroplast. (Note: Not to be confused with chromatophore—the pigmented cells in some animals—or chromatophore—the membrane associated vesicle in some bacteria.)

Chloroplasts are believed to have arisen after mitochondria, since all eukaryotes contain mitochondria, but not all have chloroplasts. This is called serial endosymbiosis—where an early eukaryote engulfed the mitochondrion ancestor, and then descendants of it then engulfed the chloroplast ancestor, creating a cell with both chloroplasts and mitochondria.

=== Secondary and tertiary endosymbiosis ===
Secondary endosymbiosis consisted of a eukaryotic alga being engulfed by another eukaryote, forming a chloroplast with three or four membranes.

Many other organisms obtained chloroplasts from the primary chloroplast lineages through secondary endosymbiosis—engulfing a red or green alga with a primary chloroplast. These chloroplasts are known as secondary plastids.

As a result of the secondary endosymbiotic event, secondary chloroplasts have additional membranes outside of the original two in primary chloroplasts. In secondary plastids, typically only the chloroplast, and sometimes its cell membrane and nucleus remain, forming a chloroplast with three or four membranes—the two cyanobacterial membranes, sometimes the eaten alga's cell membrane, and the phagosomal vacuole from the host's cell membrane.

The genes in the phagocytosed eukaryotes nucleus are often transferred to the secondary host's nucleus. Cryptomonas and chlorarachniophytes retain the phagocytosed eukaryotes nucleus, an object called a nucleomorph, located between the second and third membranes of the chloroplast.

All secondary chloroplasts come from green and red algae. No secondary chloroplasts from glaucophytes have been observed, probably because glaucophytes are relatively rare in nature, making them less likely to have been taken up by another eukaryote.

Still other organisms, including the dinoflagellates Karlodinium and Karenia, obtained chloroplasts by engulfing an organism with a secondary plastid. These are called tertiary plastids.

Possible cladogram of chloroplast evolution Circles represent endosymbiotic events. For clarity, dinophyte tertiary endosymbioses and many nonphotosynthetic lineages have been omitted.^{a} It is now established that Chromalveolata is paraphyletic to Rhizaria.

== Primary chloroplast lineages ==
All primary chloroplasts belong to one of four chloroplast lineages—the glaucophyte chloroplast lineage, the rhodophyte ("red") chloroplast lineage, the chloroplastida ("green") chloroplast lineage, and the amoeboid Paulinella chromatophora lineage. The glaucophyte, rhodophyte, and chloroplastidian lineages are all descended from the same ancestral endosymbiotic event and are all within the group Archaeplastida.

=== Glaucophyte chloroplasts ===
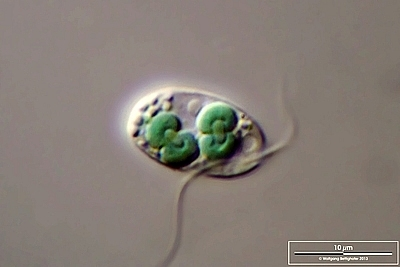
The glaucophyte Cyanophora paradoxa with two chloroplasts in the process of dividing.

The glaucophyte chloroplast group is the smallest of the three primary chloroplast lineages as there are only 25 described glaucophyte species. Glaucophytes diverged first before the red and green chloroplast lineages diverged. Because of this, they are sometimes considered intermediates between cyanobacteria and the red and green chloroplasts. This early divergence is supported by both phylogenetic studies and physical features present in glaucophyte chloroplasts and cyanobacteria, but not the red and green chloroplasts. First, glaucophyte chloroplasts have a peptidoglycan wall, a type of cell wall otherwise only in bacteria (including cyanobacteria). (Note: For this reason, glaucophyte chloroplasts are also known as 'muroplasts' from the Latin muro meaning wall.) Second, glaucophyte chloroplasts contain concentric unstacked thylakoids which surround a carboxysome – an icosahedral structure that contains the enzyme RuBisCO responsible for carbon fixation. Third, starch created by the chloroplast is collected outside the chloroplast. Additionally, like cyanobacteria, both glaucophyte and rhodophyte thylakoids are studded with light collecting structures called phycobilisomes.

=== Rhodophyta (red chloroplasts) ===
Diversity of red algae. Red algal chloroplasts are characterized by phycobilin pigments which often give them their reddish color.

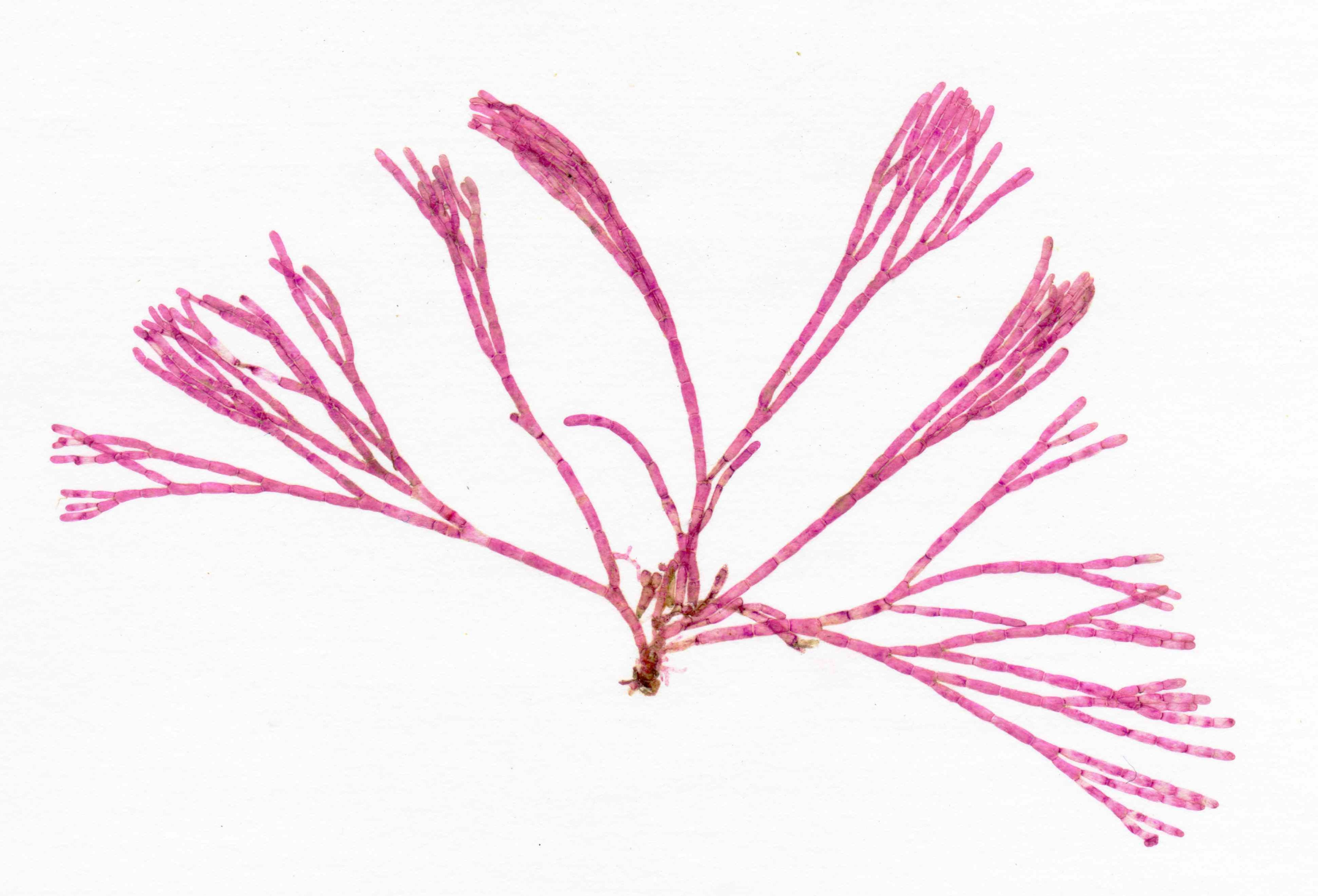
Bornetia secundiflora

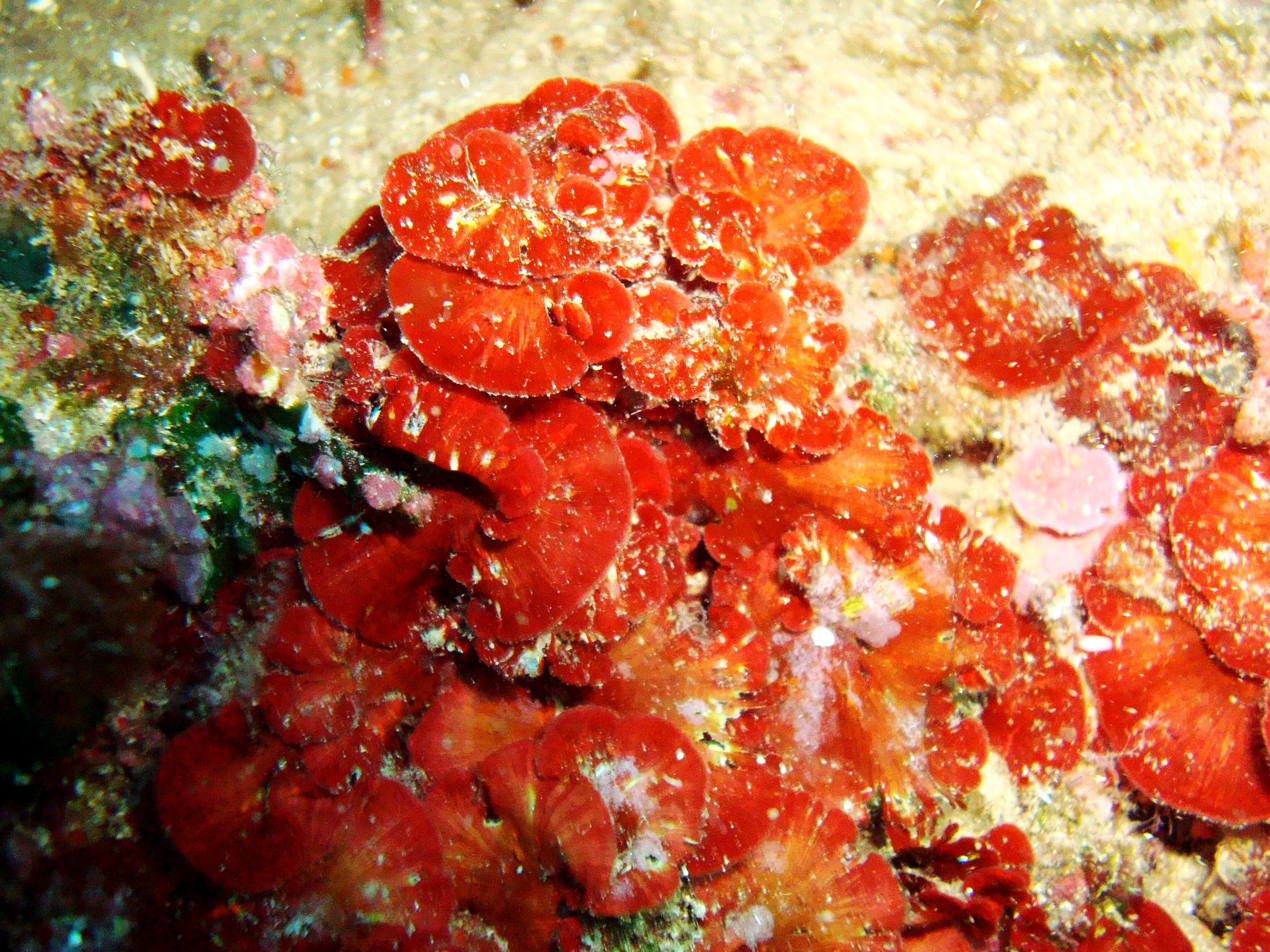
Peyssonnelia squamaria

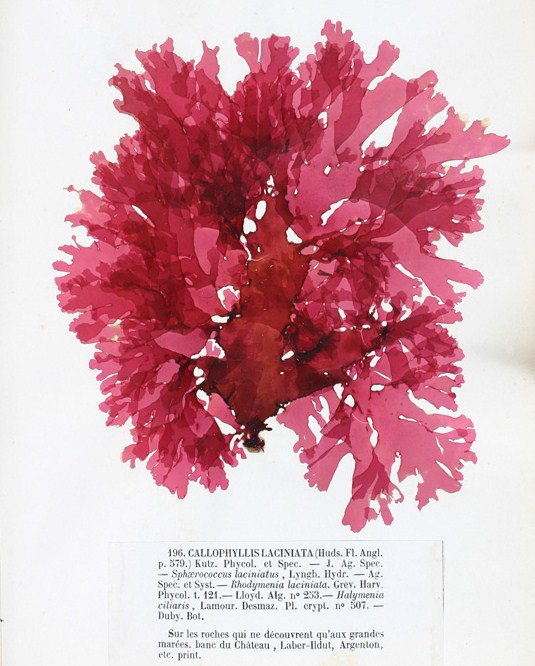
Cyanidium

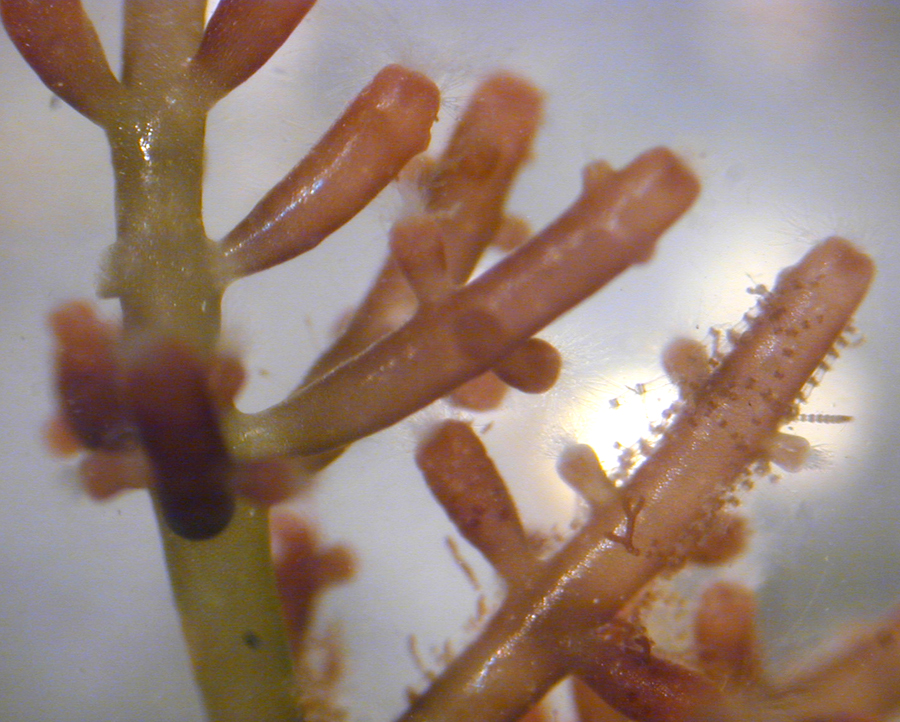
Laurencia

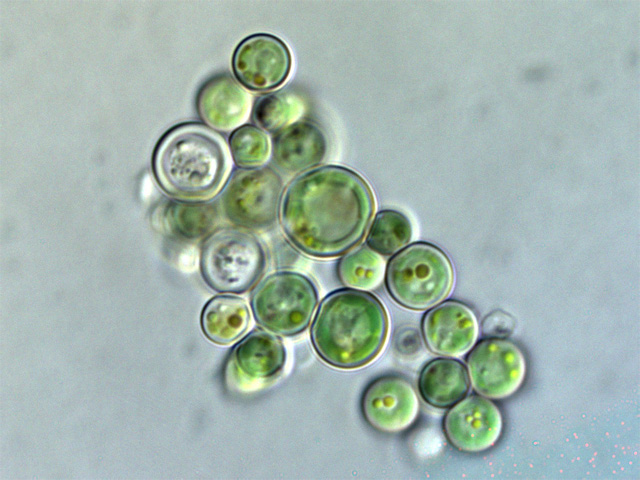
Callophyllis laciniata

The rhodophyte, or red algae, group is a large and diverse lineage. Rhodophyte chloroplasts are also called rhodoplasts, literally "red chloroplasts". Rhodoplasts have a double membrane with an intermembrane space and phycobilin pigments organized into phycobilisomes on the thylakoid membranes, preventing their thylakoids from stacking. Some contain pyrenoids. Rhodoplasts have chlorophyll a and phycobilins for photosynthetic pigments; the phycobilin phycoerythrin is responsible for giving many red algae their distinctive red color. However, since they also contain the blue-green chlorophyll a and other pigments, many are reddish to purple from the combination. The red phycoerythrin pigment is an adaptation to help red algae catch more sunlight in deep water—as such, some red algae that live in shallow water have less phycoerythrin in their rhodoplasts, and can appear more greenish. Rhodoplasts synthesize a form of starch called floridean starch, which collects into granules outside the rhodoplast, in the cytoplasm of the red alga.

=== Chloroplastida (green chloroplasts) ===
Diversity of green algae. Green algal chloroplasts are characterized by their pigments chlorophyll a and chlorophyll b which give them their green color.

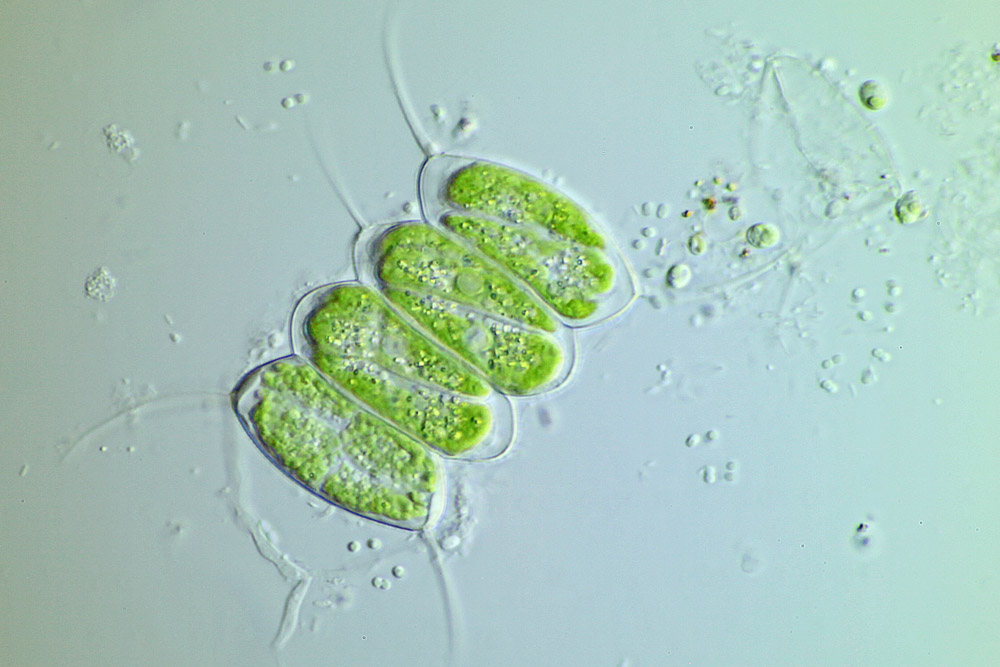
Scenedesmus

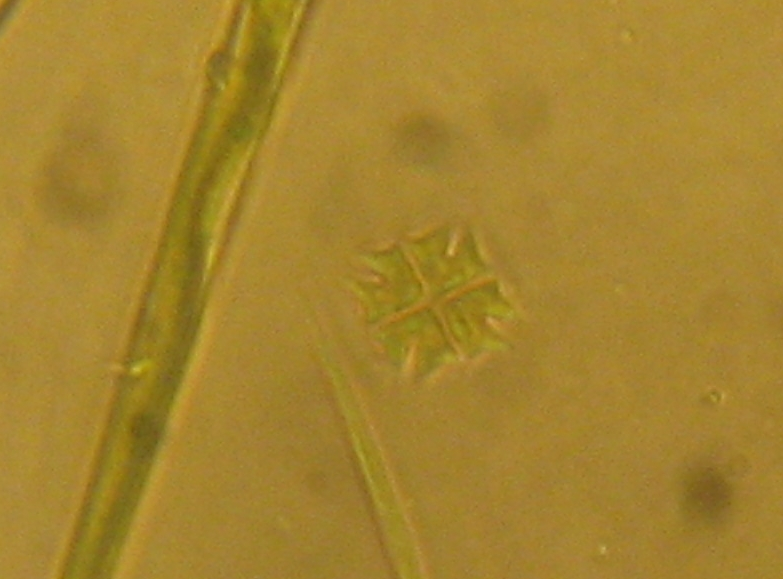
Micrasterias

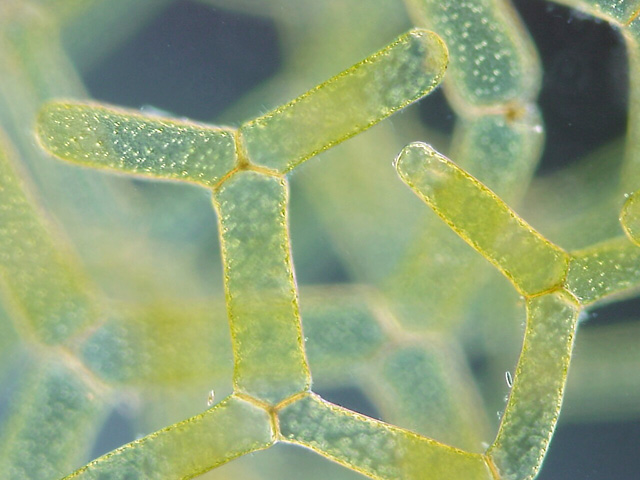
Hydrodictyon

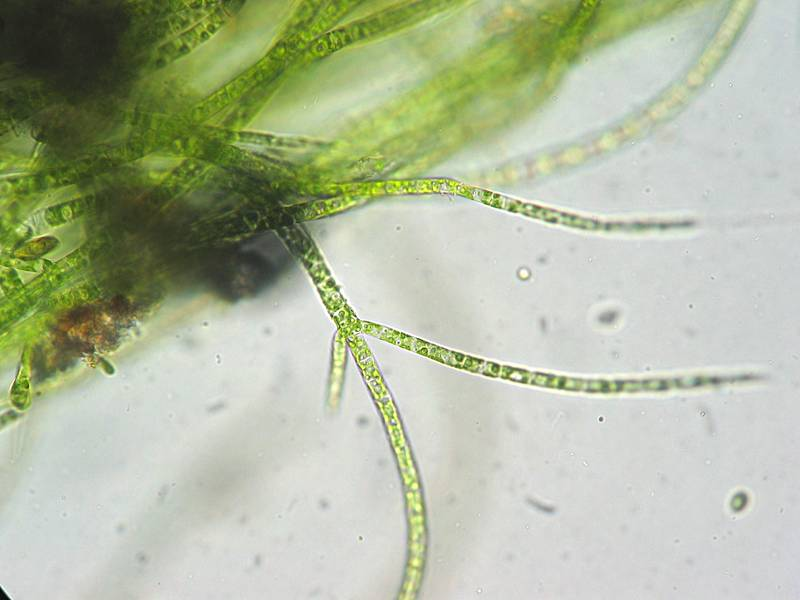
Stigeoclonium

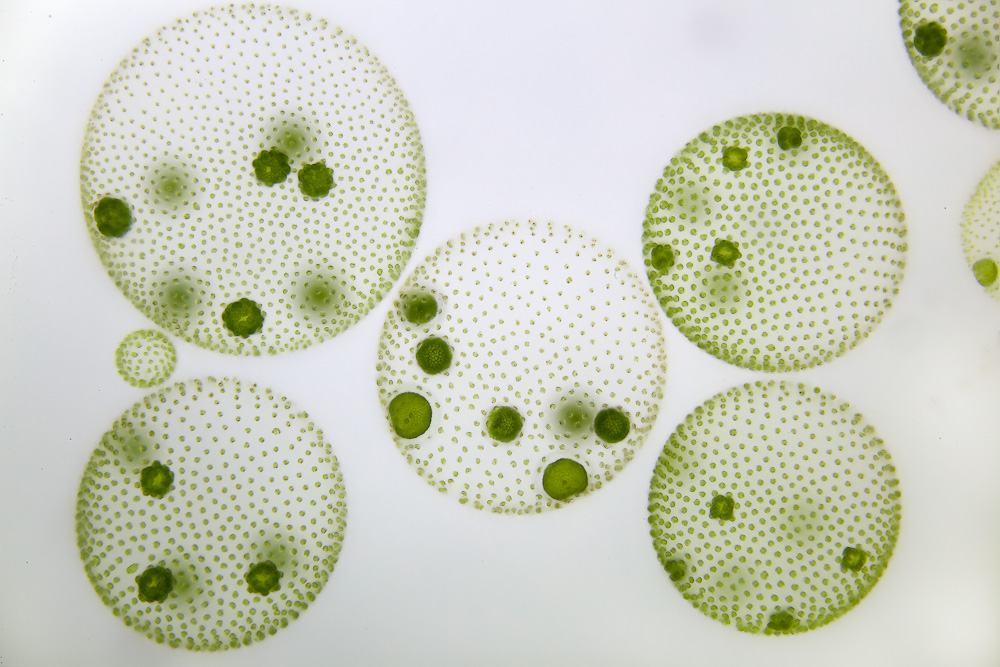
Volvox

The chloroplastida group is another large, highly diverse lineage that includes both green algae and land plants. This group is also called Viridiplantae, which includes two core clades—Chlorophyta and Streptophyta.

Most green chloroplasts are green in color, though some aren't due to accessory pigments that override the green from chlorophylls, such as in the resting cells of Haematococcus pluvialis. Green chloroplasts differ from glaucophyte and red algal chloroplasts in that they have lost their phycobilisomes, and contain chlorophyll b. They have also lost the peptidoglycan wall between their double membrane, leaving an intermembrane space. Some plants have kept some genes required for the synthesis of peptidoglycan, but have repurposed them for use in chloroplast division instead. Chloroplastida lineages also keep their starch inside their chloroplasts. In plants and some algae, the chloroplast thylakoids are arranged in grana stacks. Some green algal chloroplasts, as well as those of hornworts, contain a structure called a pyrenoid, that concentrate RuBisCO and CO_{2} in the chloroplast, functionally similar to the glaucophyte carboxysome.

There are some lineages of non-photosynthetic parasitic green algae that have lost their chloroplasts entirely, such as Prototheca, or have no chloroplast while retaining the separate chloroplast genome, as in Helicosporidium. Morphological and physiological similarities, as well as phylogenetics, confirm that these are lineages that ancestrally had chloroplasts but have since lost them.

=== Paulinella chromatophora ===
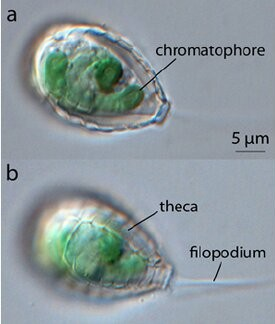
Light micrograph of the amoeboid Paulinella chromatophora

The photosynthetic amoeboids in the genus Paulinella—P. chromatophora, P. micropora, and marine P. longichromatophora—have the only known independently evolved chloroplast, often called a chromatophore. While all other chloroplasts originate from a single ancient endosymbiotic event, Paulinella independently acquired an endosymbiotic cyanobacterium from the genus Synechococcus around 90 – 140 million years ago. Each Paulinella cell contains one or two sausage-shaped chloroplasts; they were first described in 1894 by German biologist Robert Lauterborn.

The chromatophore is highly reduced compared to its free-living cyanobacterial relatives and has limited functions. For example, it has a genome of about 1 million base pairs, one third the size of Synechococcus genomes, and only encodes around 850 proteins. However, this is still much larger than other chloroplast genomes, which are typically around 150,000 base pairs. Chromatophores have also transferred much less of their DNA to the nucleus of their hosts. About 0.3–0.8% of the nuclear DNA in Paulinella is from the chromatophore, compared with 11–14% from the chloroplast in plants. Similar to other chloroplasts, Paulinella provides specific proteins to the chromatophore using a specific targeting sequence. Because chromatophores are much younger compared to the canonical chloroplasts, Paulinella chromatophora is studied to understand how early chloroplasts evolved.

== Secondary and tertiary chloroplast lineages ==
=== Green algal derived chloroplasts ===
Green algae have been taken up by many groups in three or four separate events. Primarily, secondary chloroplasts derived from green algae are in the euglenoids and chlorarachniophytes. They are also found in one lineage of dinoflagellates and possibly the ancestor of the CASH lineage (cryptomonads, alveolates, stramenopiles and haptophytes) Many green algal derived chloroplasts contain pyrenoids, but unlike chloroplasts in their green algal ancestors, storage product collects in granules outside the chloroplast.

==== Euglenophytes ====
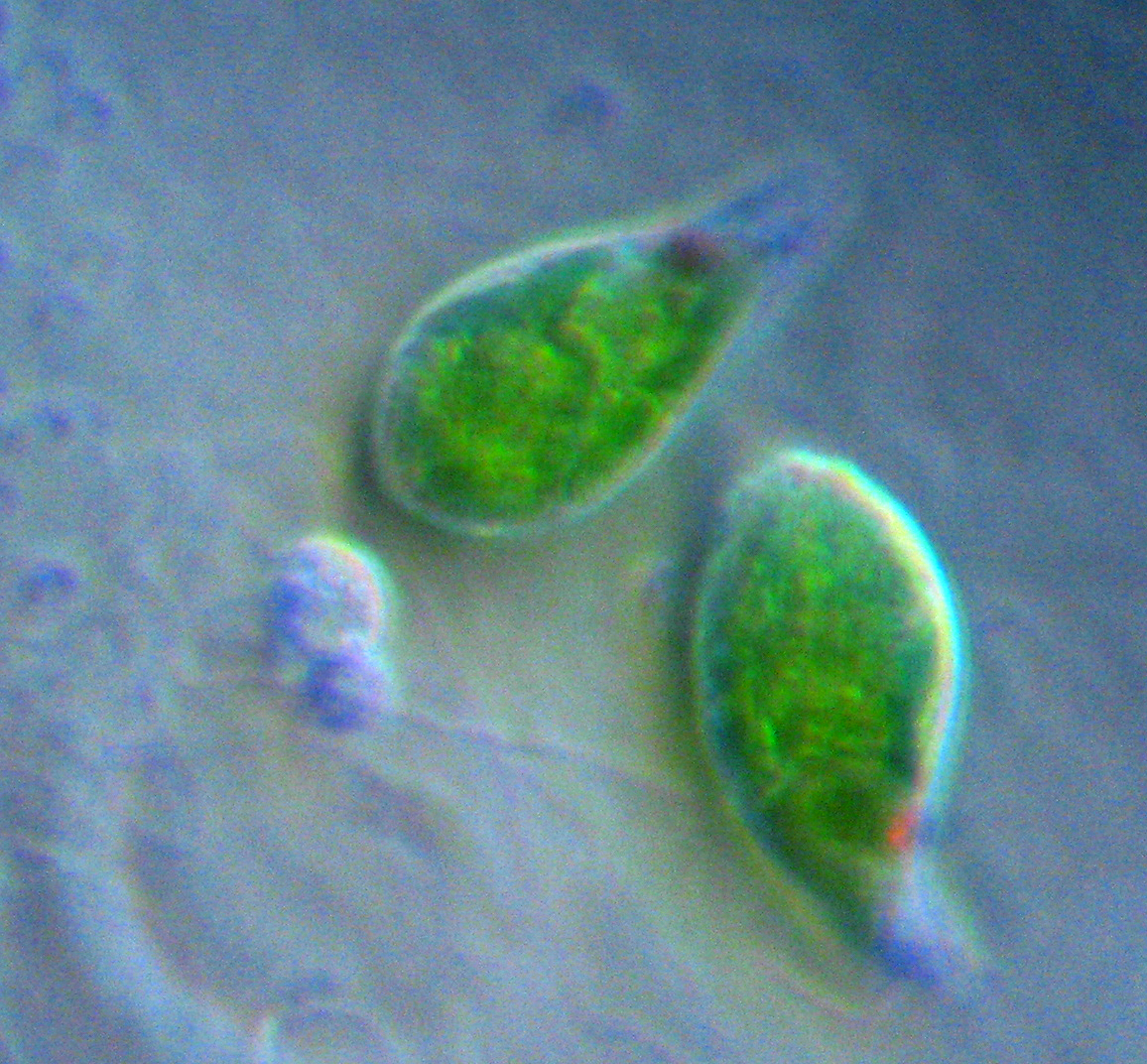
Euglena, a euglenophyte, contains secondary chloroplasts from green algae.

The euglenophytes are a group of common flagellated protists that contain chloroplasts derived from a green alga. Euglenophytes are the only group outside Diaphoretickes that have chloroplasts without performing kleptoplasty. Euglenophyte chloroplasts have three membranes. It is thought that the membrane of the primary endosymbiont host was lost (e.g. the green algal membrane), leaving the two cyanobacterial membranes and the secondary host's phagosomal membrane. Euglenophyte chloroplasts have a pyrenoid and thylakoids stacked in groups of three. The carbon fixed through photosynthesis is stored in the form of paramylon, which is contained in membrane-bound granules in the cytoplasm of the euglenophyte.

==== Chlorarachniophytes ====
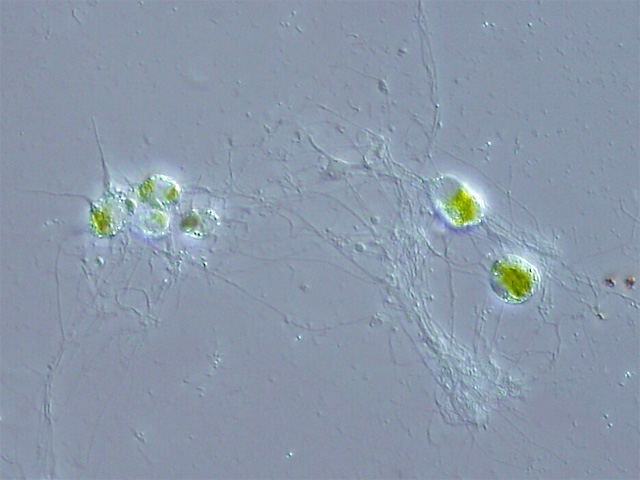
Chlorarachnion reptans is a chlorarachniophyte. Chlorarachniophytes replaced their original red algal endosymbiont with a green alga.

Chlorarachniophytes are a rare group of organisms that also contain chloroplasts derived from green algae, though their story is more complicated than that of the euglenophytes. The ancestor of chlorarachniophytes is thought to have been a eukaryote with a red algal derived chloroplast. It is then thought to have lost its first red algal chloroplast, and later engulfed a green alga, giving it its second, green algal derived chloroplast.

Chlorarachniophyte chloroplasts are bounded by four membranes, except near the cell membrane, where the chloroplast membranes fuse into a double membrane. Their thylakoids are arranged in loose stacks of three. Chlorarachniophytes have a form of polysaccharide called chrysolaminarin, which they store in the cytoplasm, often collected around the chloroplast pyrenoid, which bulges into the cytoplasm.

Chlorarachniophyte chloroplasts are notable because the green alga they are derived from has not been completely broken down—its nucleus still persists as a nucleomorph found between the second and third chloroplast membranes—the periplasmic space, which corresponds to the green alga's cytoplasm.

==== Prasinophyte-derived chloroplast ====
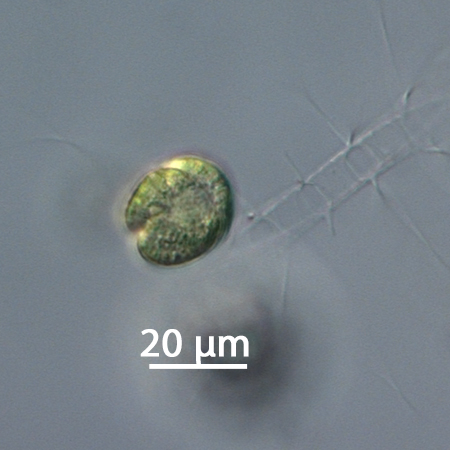
Lepidium chlorophytum green colour is caused by a plastid derived from Pedinophyceae.

Dinoflagellates in the genus Lepidodinium have lost their original peridinin chloroplast and replaced it with a green algal derived chloroplast (more specifically, a prasinophyte). Lepidodinium is the only dinoflagellate that has a chloroplast that's not from the rhodoplast lineage. The chloroplast is surrounded by two membranes and has no nucleomorph—all the nucleomorph genes have been transferred to the dinophyte nucleus. The endosymbiotic event that led to this chloroplast was serial secondary endosymbiosis rather than tertiary endosymbiosis—the endosymbiont was a green alga containing a primary chloroplast (making a secondary chloroplast).

==== Tripartite symbiosis ====
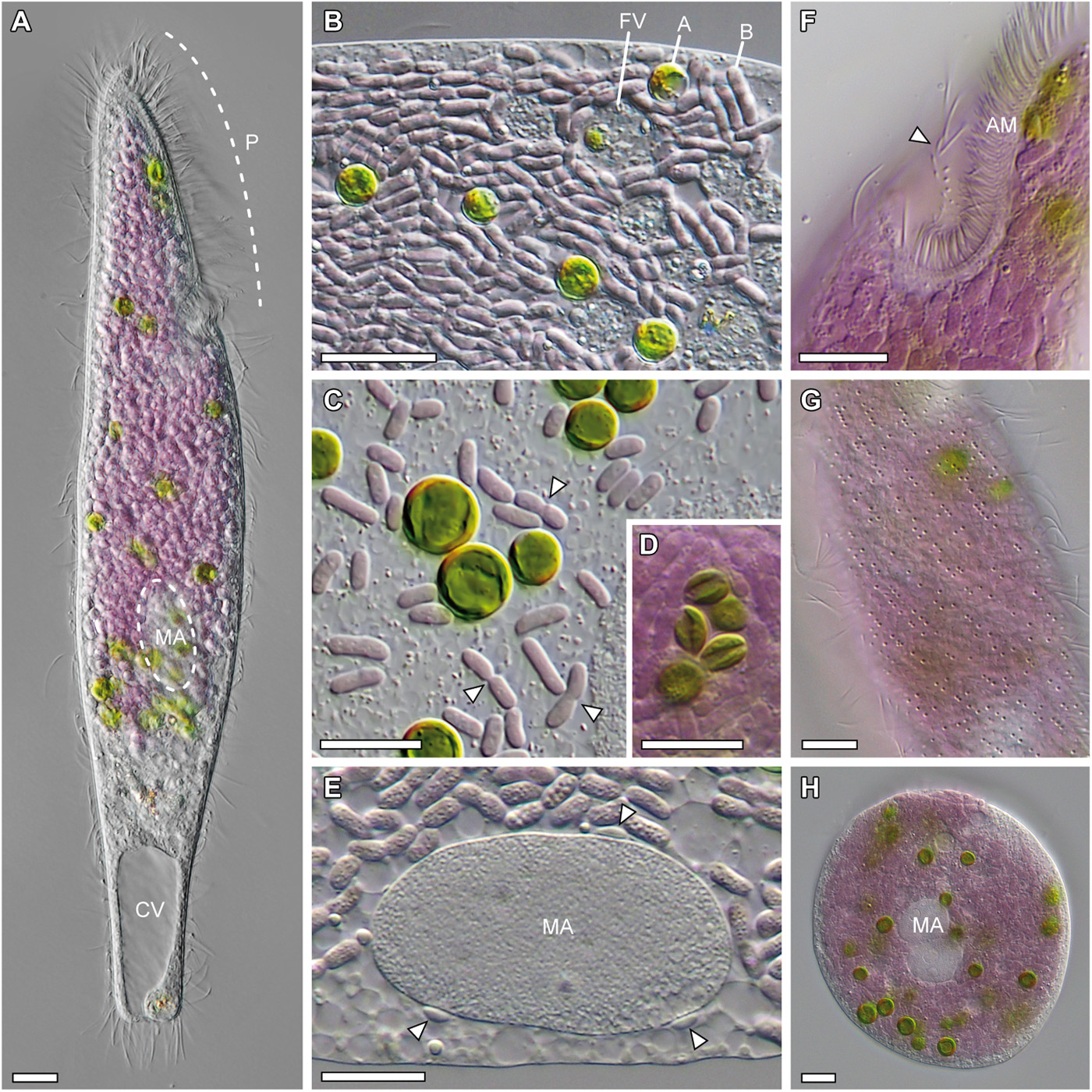
Pseudoblepharisma tenue with its two photosynthetic symbionts.

The ciliate Pseudoblepharisma tenue has two bacterial symbionts, one pink, one green. In 2021, both symbionts were confirmed to be photosynthetic: Ca. Thiodictyon intracellulare (Chromatiaceae), a purple sulfur bacterium with a genome just half the size of their closest known relatives; and Chlorella sp. K10, a green alga. There is also a variant of Pseudoblepharisma tenue that only contains chloroplasts from green algae and no endosymbiotic purple bacteria.

=== Red algal derived chloroplasts ===
Secondary chloroplasts derived from red algae appear to have only been taken up only once, which then diversified into a large group called chromists or chromalveolates. Today they are found in the haptophytes, cryptomonads, heterokonts, dinoflagellates and apicomplexans (the CASH lineage). Red algal secondary chloroplasts usually contain chlorophyll c and are surrounded by four membranes.

However, chromist monophyly has been rejected, and it is considered more likely that some chromists acquired their plastids by incorporating another chromist instead of inheriting them from a common ancestor. Cryptophytes seem to have acquired plastids from red algae, which were then transmitted from them to both the Heterokontophytes and the Haptophytes, and then from these last to the Myzozoa.

==== Cryptophytes ====
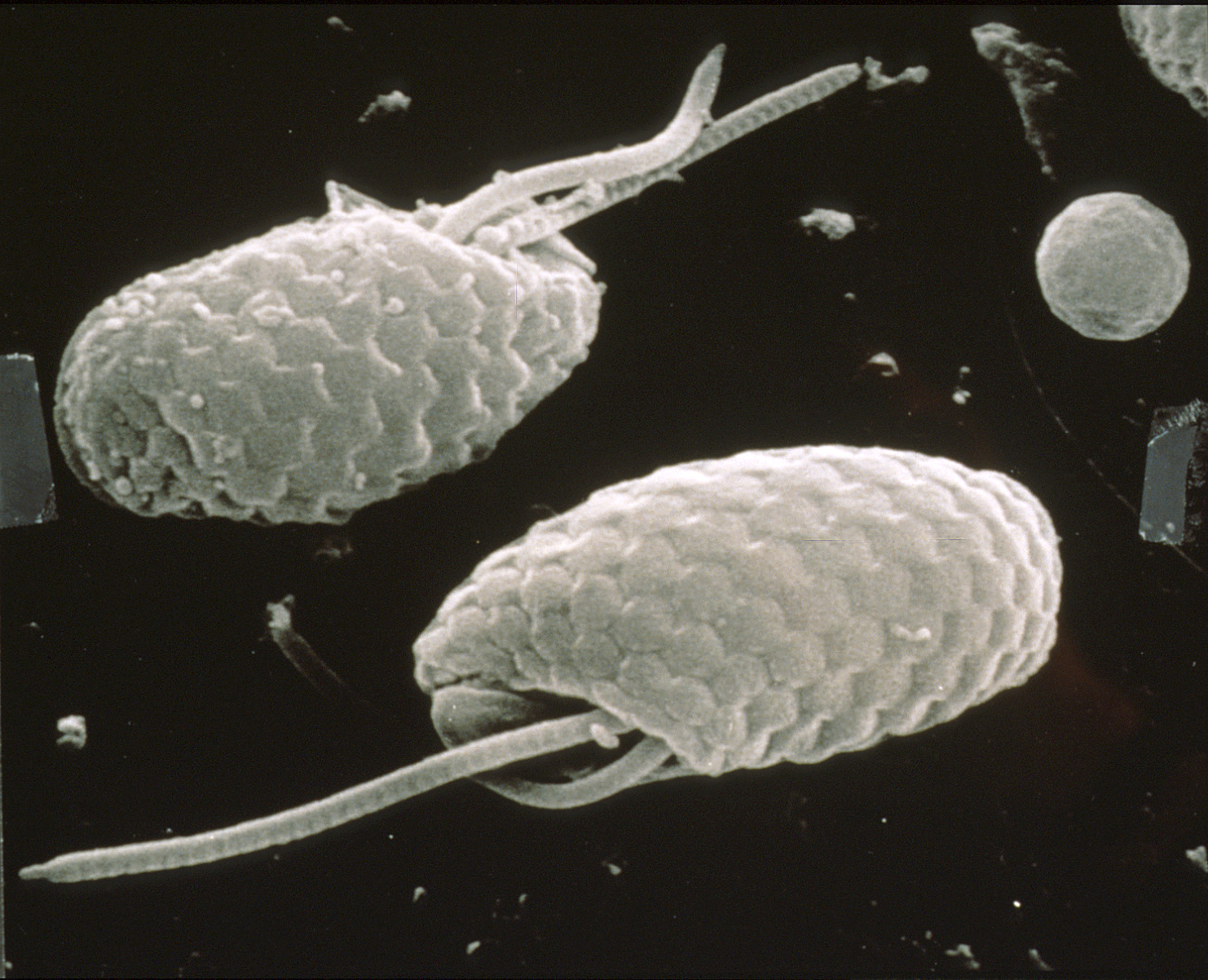
Cryptophytes under SEM.

Cryptophytes, or cryptomonads, are a group of algae that contain a red-algal derived chloroplast. Cryptophyte chloroplasts contain a nucleomorph that superficially resembles that of the chlorarachniophytes. Cryptophyte chloroplasts have four membranes. The outermost membrane is continuous with the rough endoplasmic reticulum. They synthesize ordinary starch, which is stored in granules found in the periplastid space—outside the original double membrane, in the place that corresponds to the ancestral red alga's cytoplasm. Inside cryptophyte chloroplasts is a pyrenoid and thylakoids in stacks of two. Cryptophyte chloroplasts do not have phycobilisomes, but they do have phycobilin pigments which they keep in the thylakoid space, rather than anchored on the outside of their thylakoid membranes.

Cryptophytes may have played a key role in the spreading of red algal based chloroplasts.

==== Haptophytes ====
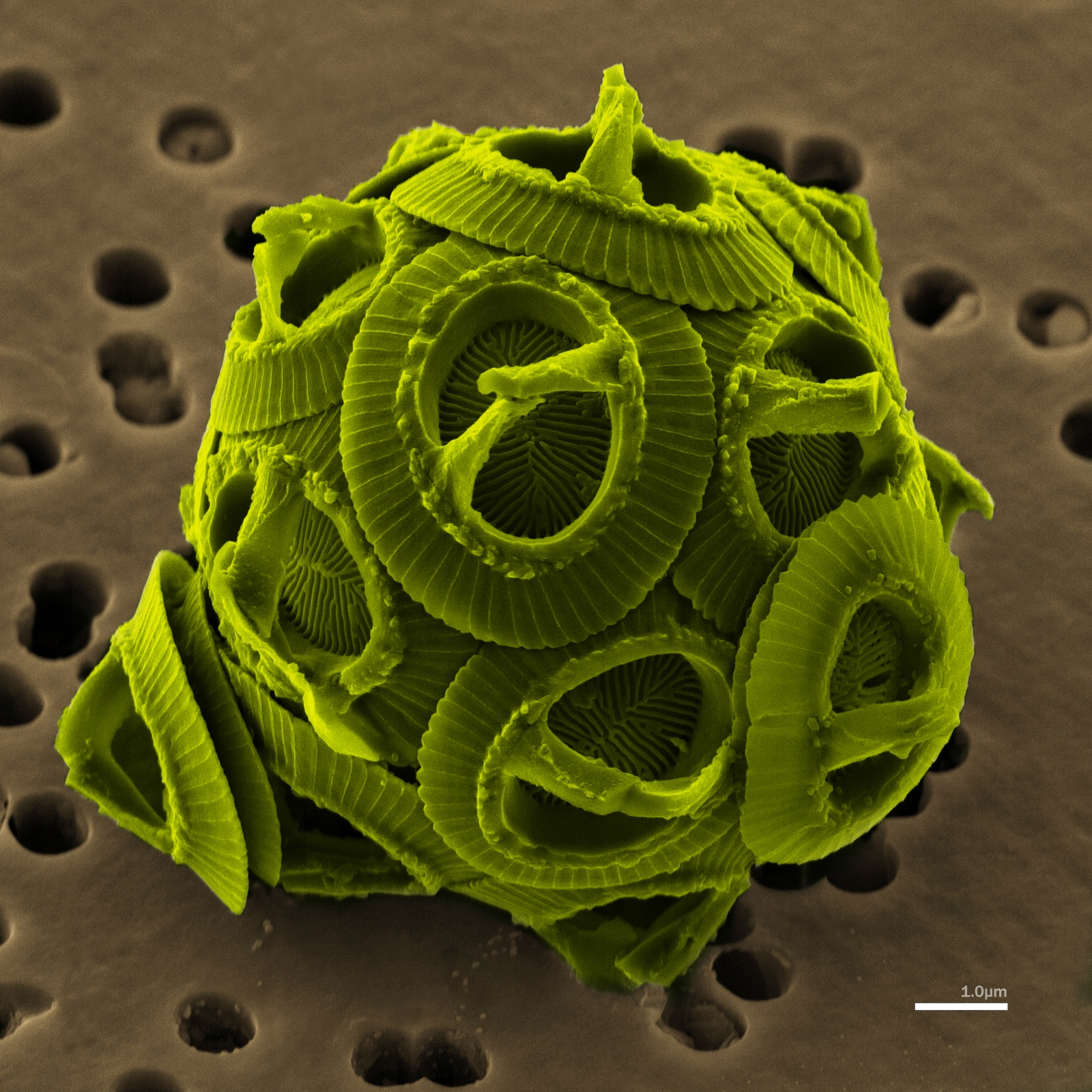
Scanning electron micrograph of Gephyrocapsa oceanica, a haptophyte.

Haptophytes are similar and closely related to cryptophytes or heterokontophytes. Their chloroplasts lack a nucleomorph, their thylakoids are in stacks of three, and they synthesize chrysolaminarin sugar, which are stored in granules completely outside of the chloroplast, in the cytoplasm of the haptophyte.

==== Stramenopiles (heterokontophytes) ====
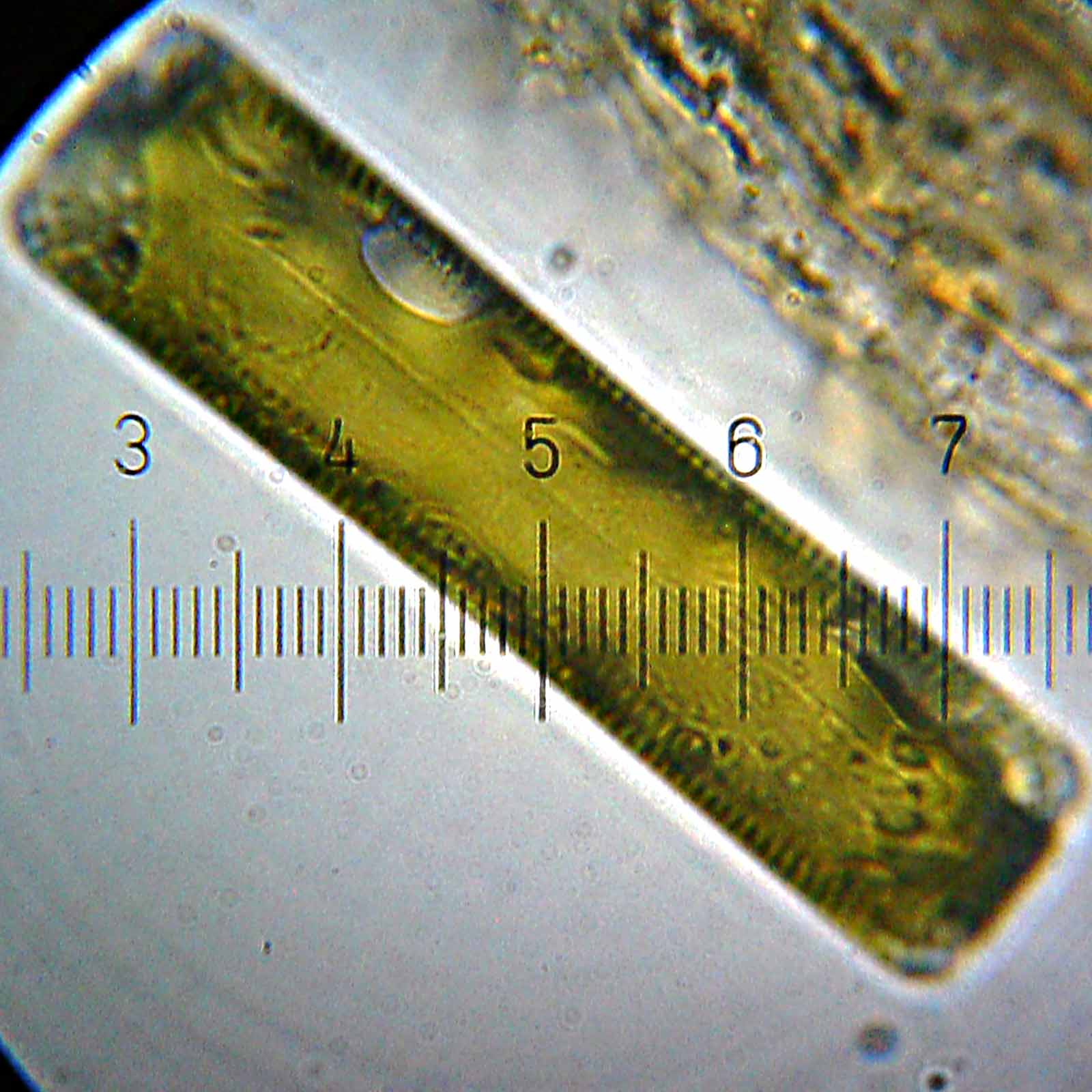
The photosynthetic pigments present in their chloroplasts make diatoms greenish-brown.

The stramenopiles, also known as heterokontophytes, are a very large and diverse group of eukaryotes. It inlcludes Ochrophyta—which includes diatoms, brown algae (seaweeds), and golden algae (chrysophytes)— and Xanthophyceae (also called yellow-green algae).

Heterokont chloroplasts are very similar to haptophyte chloroplasts. They have a pyrenoid, triplet thylakoids, and, with some exceptions, four layer plastidic envelope with the outermost membrane connected to the endoplasmic reticulum. Like haptophytes, stramenopiles store sugar in chrysolaminarin granules in the cytoplasm. Stramenopile chloroplasts contain chlorophyll a and, with a few exceptions, chlorophyll c. They also have carotenoids which give them their many colors.

==== Apicomplexans, chromerids, and dinophytes ====
The alveolates are a major clade of unicellular eukaryotes of both autotrophic and heterotrophic members. Many members contain a red-algal derived plastid. One notable characteristic of this diverse group is the frequent loss of photosynthesis. However, a majority of these heterotrophs continue to process a non-photosynthetic plastid.

===== Apicomplexans =====
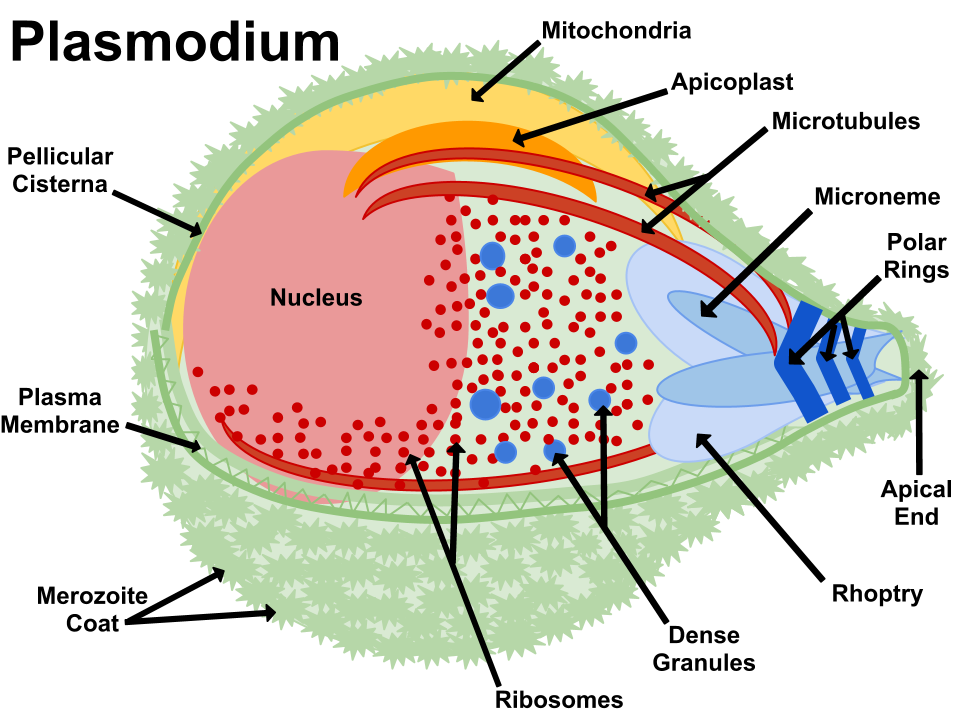
Diagram of Plasmodium, including its apicoplast.

Apicomplexans are a group of alveolates. Like the helicosproidia, they're parasitic, and have a nonphotosynthetic chloroplast. They were once thought to be related to the helicosproidia, but it is now known that the helicosproida are green algae rather than part of the CASH lineage. The apicomplexans include Plasmodium, the malaria parasite. Many apicomplexans keep a vestigial red algal derived chloroplast called an apicoplast, which they inherited from their ancestors. Apicoplasts have lost all photosynthetic function, and contain no photosynthetic pigments or true thylakoids. They are bounded by four membranes, but the membranes are not connected to the endoplasmic reticulum. Other apicomplexans like Cryptosporidium have lost the chloroplast completely. Apicomplexans store their energy in amylopectin granules that are located in their cytoplasm, even though they are nonphotosynthetic.

The fact that apicomplexans still keep their nonphotosynthetic chloroplast around demonstrates how the chloroplast carries out important functions other than photosynthesis. Plant chloroplasts provide plant cells with many important things besides sugar, and apicoplasts are no different—they synthesize fatty acids, isopentenyl pyrophosphate, iron-sulfur clusters, and carry out part of the heme pathway. The most important apicoplast function is isopentenyl pyrophosphate synthesis—in fact, apicomplexans die when something interferes with this apicoplast function, and when apicomplexans are grown in an isopentenyl pyrophosphate-rich medium, they dump the organelle.

===== Chromerids =====
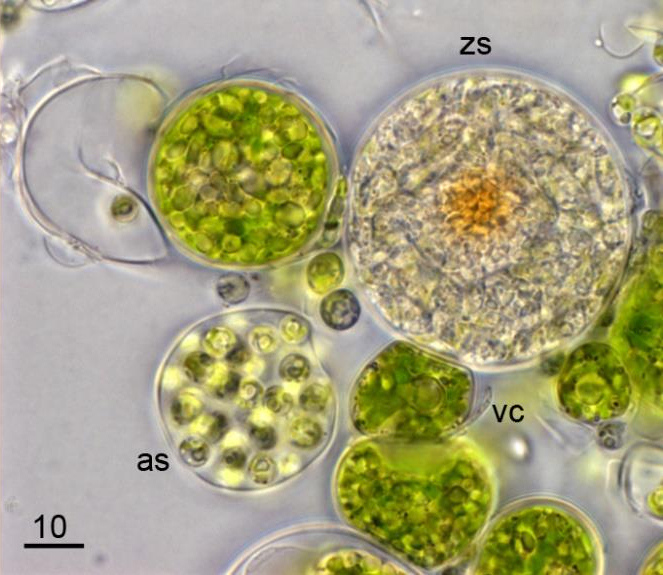
Typical life cycle stages of Vitrella brassicaformis, a chromerid.

The chromerids are a group of algae known from Australian corals which comprise some close photosynthetic relatives of the apicomplexans. The first member, Chromera velia, was discovered and first isolated in 2001. The discovery of Chromera velia with similar structure to the apicomplexans, provides an important link in the evolutionary history of the apicomplexans and dinophytes. Their plastids have four membranes, lack chlorophyll c and use the type II form of RuBisCO obtained from a horizontal transfer event.

===== Dinophytes =====
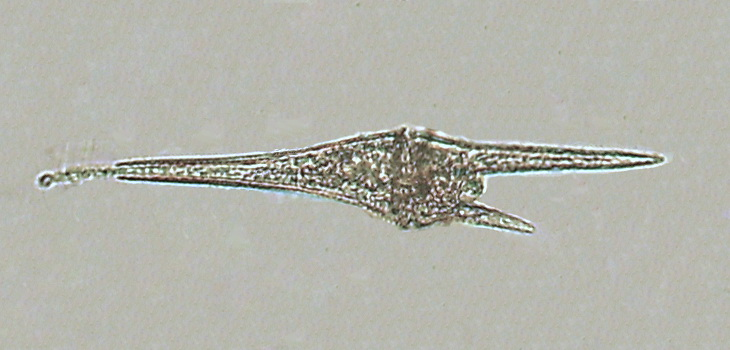
Ceratium furca, a peridinin-containing dinophyte.

The dinoflagellates are yet another very large and diverse group, around half of which are at least partially photosynthetic (i.e. mixotrophic). Dinoflagellate chloroplasts have relatively complex history. Most dinoflagellate chloroplasts are secondary red algal derived chloroplasts. Many dinoflagellates have lost the chloroplast (becoming nonphotosynthetic), some of these have replaced it though tertiary endosymbiosis. Others replaced their original chloroplast with a green algal derived chloroplast. The peridinin chloroplast is thought to be the dinophytes' "original" chloroplast, which has been lost, reduced, replaced, or has company in several other dinophyte lineages.

The most common dinophyte chloroplast is the peridinin-type chloroplast, characterized by the carotenoid pigment peridinin in their chloroplasts, along with chlorophyll a and chlorophyll c_{2}. Peridinin is not found in any other group of chloroplasts. The peridinin chloroplast is bounded by three membranes (occasionally two), having lost the red algal endosymbiont's original cell membrane. The outermost membrane is not connected to the endoplasmic reticulum. They contain a pyrenoid, and have triplet-stacked thylakoids. Starch is found outside the chloroplast. Peridinin chloroplasts also have DNA that is highly reduced and fragmented into many small circles. Most of the genome has migrated to the nucleus, and only critical photosynthesis-related genes remain in the chloroplast.

Most dinophyte chloroplasts contain form II RuBisCO, at least the photosynthetic pigments chlorophyll a, chlorophyll c_{2}, beta-carotene, and at least one dinophyte-unique xanthophyll (peridinin, dinoxanthin, or diadinoxanthin), giving many a golden-brown color. All dinophytes store starch in their cytoplasm, and most have chloroplasts with thylakoids arranged in stacks of three.

=== Haptophyte-derived chloroplasts ===
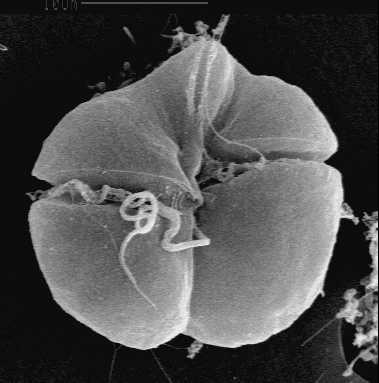
Karenia brevis is a fucoxanthin-containing dynophyte responsible for algal blooms called "red tides".

The fucoxanthin dinophyte lineages (including Karlodinium and Karenia) lost their original red algal derived chloroplast, and replaced it with a new chloroplast derived from a haptophyte endosymbiont, making these tertiary plastids. Karlodinium and Karenia probably took up different endosymbionts. Because the haptophyte chloroplast has four membranes, tertiary endosymbiosis would be expected to create a six membraned chloroplast, adding the haptophyte's cell membrane and the dinophyte's phagosomal vacuole. However, the haptophyte was heavily reduced, stripped of a few membranes and its nucleus, leaving only its chloroplast (with its original double membrane), and possibly one or two additional membranes around it.

Fucoxanthin-containing chloroplasts are characterized by having the pigment fucoxanthin (actually 19′-hexanoyloxy-fucoxanthin and/or 19′-butanoyloxy-fucoxanthin) and no peridinin. Fucoxanthin is also found in haptophyte chloroplasts, providing evidence of ancestry.

=== Diatom-derived chloroplasts ===
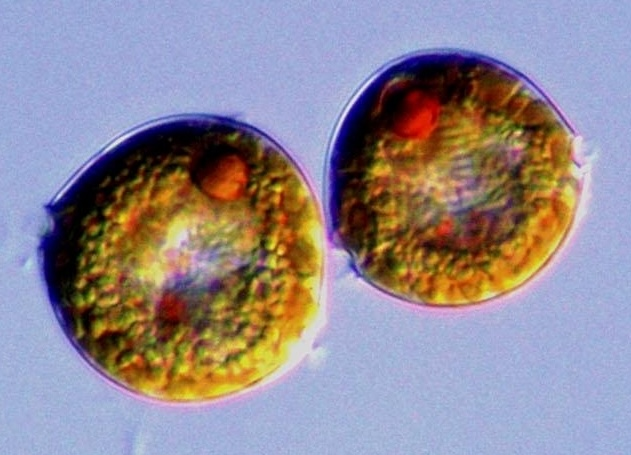
Durinskia is a genus significant to the study of endosymbiotic events and organelle integration.

Some dinophytes, like Kryptoperidinium and Durinskia, have a diatom (heterokontophyte)-derived chloroplast. These chloroplasts are bounded by up to five membranes, (depending on whether the entire diatom endosymbiont is counted as the chloroplast, or just the red algal derived chloroplast inside it). The diatom endosymbiont has been reduced relatively little—it still retains its original mitochondria, and has endoplasmic reticulum, ribosomes, a nucleus, and of course, red algal derived chloroplasts—practically a complete cell, all inside the host's endoplasmic reticulum lumen. However the diatom endosymbiont can't store its own food—its storage polysaccharide is found in granules in the dinophyte host's cytoplasm instead. The diatom endosymbiont's nucleus is present, but it probably can't be called a nucleomorph because it shows no sign of genome reduction, and might have even been expanded. Diatoms have been engulfed by dinoflagellates at least three times.

The diatom endosymbiont is bounded by a single membrane, inside it are chloroplasts with four membranes. Like the diatom endosymbiont's diatom ancestor, the chloroplasts have triplet thylakoids and pyrenoids.

In some of these genera, the diatom endosymbiont's chloroplasts aren't the only chloroplasts in the dinophyte. The original three-membraned peridinin chloroplast is still around, converted to an eyespot.

=== Kleptoplasty ===
In some groups of mixotrophic protists, like some dinoflagellates (e.g. Dinophysis), chloroplasts are separated from a captured alga and used temporarily. These klepto chloroplasts may only have a lifetime of a few days and are then replaced.

==== Cryptophyte-derived dinophyte chloroplast ====
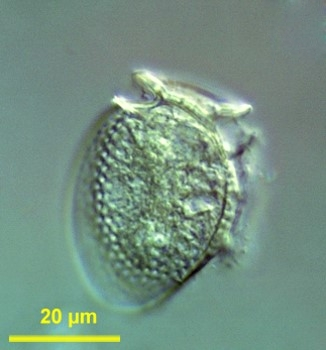
Dinophysis acuminata has chloroplasts taken from a cryptophyte.

Members of the genus Dinophysis have a phycobilin-containing chloroplast taken from a cryptophyte. However, the cryptophyte is not an endosymbiont—only the chloroplast seems to have been taken, and the chloroplast has been stripped of its nucleomorph and outermost two membranes, leaving just a two-membraned chloroplast. Cryptophyte chloroplasts require their nucleomorph to maintain themselves, and Dinophysis species grown in cell culture alone cannot survive, so it is possible (but not confirmed) that the Dinophysis chloroplast is a kleptoplast—if so, Dinophysis chloroplasts wear out and Dinophysis species must continually engulf cryptophytes to obtain new chloroplasts to replace the old ones.

== Chloroplast DNA ==
Chloroplasts, like other endosymbiotic organelles, contain a genome separate from that in the cell nucleus. The existence of chloroplast DNA (cpDNA) was identified biochemically in 1959, and confirmed by electron microscopy in 1962. The discoveries that the chloroplast contains ribosomes and performs protein synthesis revealed that the chloroplast is genetically semi-autonomous. Chloroplast DNA was first sequenced in 1986. Since then, hundreds of chloroplast genomes from various species have been sequenced, but they are mostly those of land plants and green algae—glaucophytes, red algae, and other algal groups are extremely underrepresented, potentially introducing some bias in views of "typical" chloroplast DNA structure and content.

=== Molecular structure ===
With few exceptions, most chloroplasts have their entire genome combined into a single large circular DNA molecule, typically 120,000–170,000 base pairs long and a mass of about 80–130 million daltons. While chloroplast genomes can almost always be assembled into a circular map, the physical DNA molecules inside cells take on a variety of linear and branching forms. New chloroplasts may contain up to 100 copies of their genome, though the number of copies decreases to about 15–20 as the chloroplasts age.

Chloroplast DNA is usually condensed into nucleoids, which can contain multiple copies of the chloroplast genome. Many nucleoids can be found in each chloroplast. In primitive red algae, the chloroplast DNA nucleoids are clustered in the center of the chloroplast, while in green plants and green algae, the nucleoids are dispersed throughout the stroma. Chloroplast DNA is not associated with true histones, proteins that are used to pack DNA molecules tightly in eukaryote nuclei. Though in red algae, similar proteins tightly pack each chloroplast DNA ring in a nucleoid.

Many chloroplast genomes contain two inverted repeats, which separate a long single copy section (LSC) from a short single copy section (SSC). A given pair of inverted repeats are rarely identical, but they are always very similar to each other, apparently resulting from concerted evolution. The inverted repeats vary wildly in length, ranging from 4,000 to 25,000 base pairs long each and containing as few as four or as many as over 150 genes. The inverted repeat regions are highly conserved in land plants, and accumulate few mutations.

Similar inverted repeats exist in the genomes of cyanobacteria and the other two chloroplast lineages (glaucophyta and rhodophyceae), suggesting that they predate the chloroplast. Some chloroplast genomes have since lost or flipped the inverted repeats (making them direct repeats). It is possible that the inverted repeats help stabilize the rest of the chloroplast genome, as chloroplast genomes which have lost some of the inverted repeat segments tend to get rearranged more.

=== DNA repair and replication ===
In chloroplasts of the moss Physcomitrella patens, the DNA mismatch repair protein Msh1 interacts with the recombinational repair proteins RecA and RecG to maintain chloroplast genome stability. In chloroplasts of the plant Arabidopsis thaliana the RecA protein maintains the integrity of the chloroplast's DNA by a process that likely involves the recombinational repair of DNA damage.

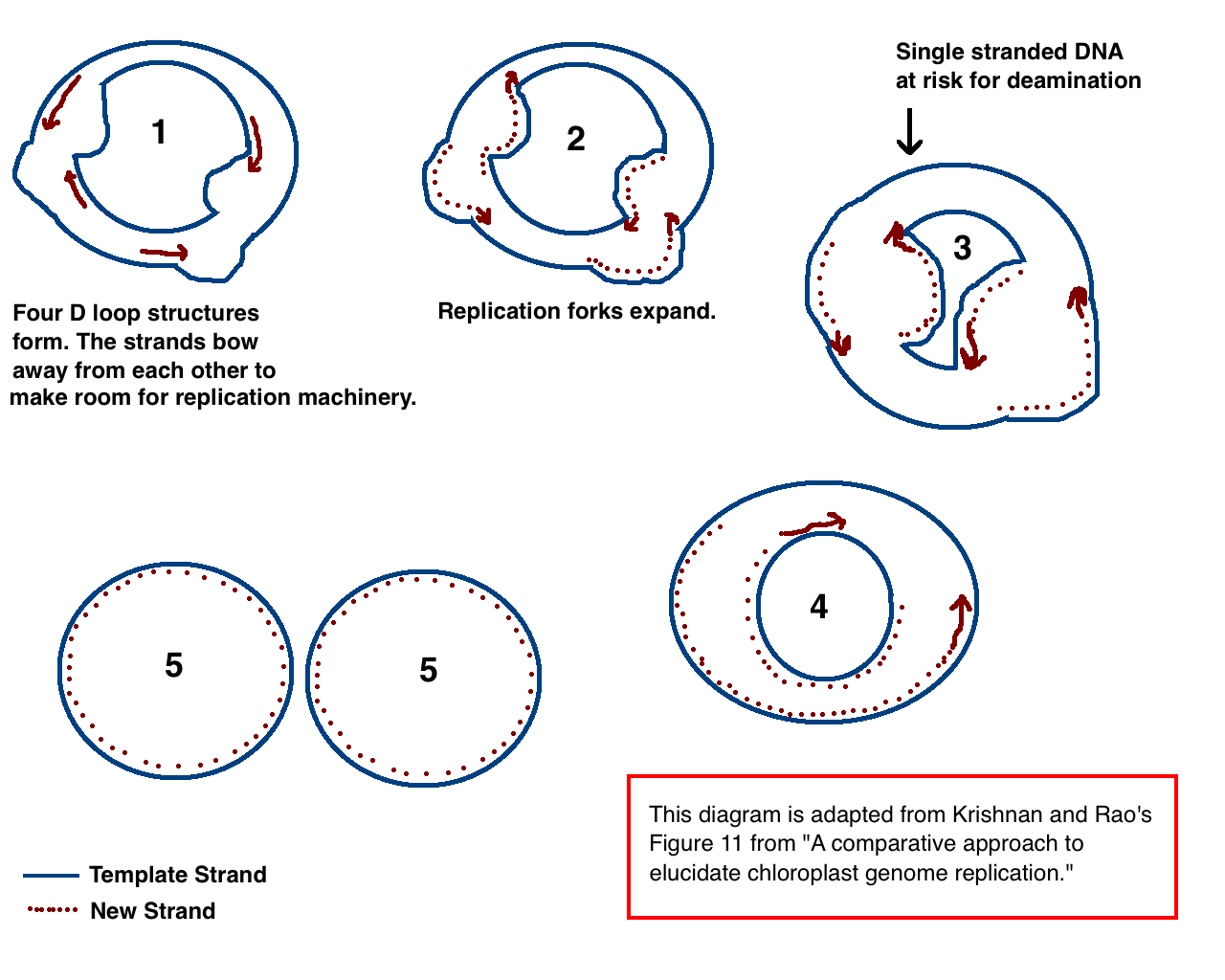
Chloroplast DNA replication via multiple D-loop mechanisms. Adapted from Krishnan NM, Rao BJ's paper "A comparative approach to elucidate chloroplast genome replication."

The mechanism for chloroplast DNA (cpDNA) replication has not been conclusively determined, but two main models have been proposed. Scientists have attempted to observe chloroplast replication via electron microscopy since the 1970s. The results of the microscopy experiments led to the idea that chloroplast DNA replicates using a double displacement loop (D-loop). As the D-loop moves through the circular DNA, it adopts a theta intermediary form, also known as a Cairns replication intermediate, and completes replication with a rolling circle mechanism. Transcription starts at specific points of origin. Multiple replication forks open up, allowing replication machinery to transcribe the DNA. As replication continues, the forks grow and eventually converge. The new cpDNA structures separate, creating daughter cpDNA chromosomes.

In addition to the early microscopy experiments, this model is also supported by the amounts of deamination seen in cpDNA. Deamination occurs when an amino group is lost and is a mutation that often results in base changes. When adenine is deaminated, it becomes hypoxanthine. Hypoxanthine can bind to cytosine, and when the XC base pair is replicated, it becomes a GC (thus, an A → G base change).

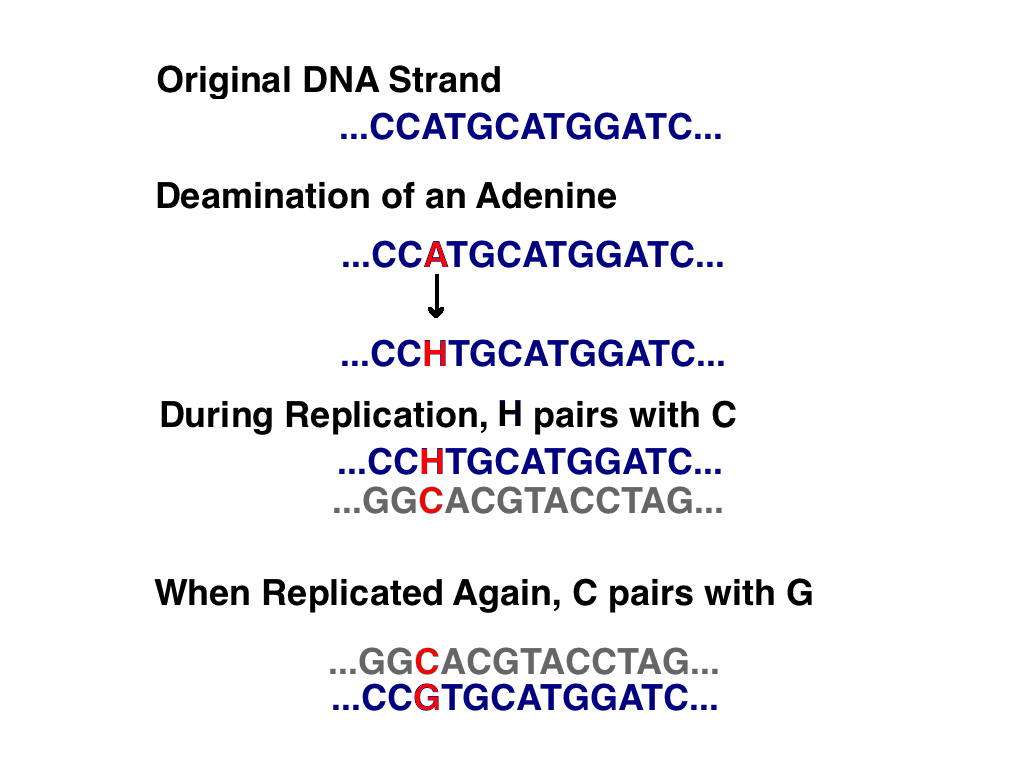
Over time, base changes in the DNA sequence can arise from deamination mutations. When adenine is deaminated, it becomes hypoxanthine, which can pair with cytosine. During replication, the cytosine will pair with guanine, causing an A --> G base change.

In cpDNA, there are several A → G deamination gradients. DNA becomes susceptible to deamination events when it is single stranded. When replication forks form, the strand not being copied is single stranded, and thus at risk for A → G deamination. Therefore, gradients in deamination indicate that replication forks were most likely present and the direction that they initially opened (the highest gradient is most likely nearest the start site because it was single stranded for the longest amount of time). This mechanism is still the leading theory today; however, a second theory suggests that most cpDNA is actually linear and replicates through homologous recombination. It further contends that only a minority of the genetic material is kept in circular chromosomes while the rest is in branched, linear, or other complex structures.

One of competing model for cpDNA replication asserts that most cpDNA is linear and participates in homologous recombination and replication structures similar to the linear and circular DNA structures of bacteriophage T4. It has been established that some plants have linear cpDNA, such as maize, and that more species still contain complex structures that scientists do not yet understand. When the original experiments on cpDNA were performed, scientists did notice linear structures; however, they attributed these linear forms to broken circles. If the branched and complex structures seen in cpDNA experiments are real and not artifacts of concatenated circular DNA or broken circles, then a D-loop mechanism of replication is insufficient to explain how those structures would replicate. At the same time, homologous recombination does not expand the multiple A --> G gradients seen in plastomes. Because of the failure to explain the deamination gradient as well as the numerous plant species that have been shown to have circular cpDNA, the predominant theory continues to hold that most cpDNA is circular and most likely replicates via a D loop mechanism.

=== Gene content and protein synthesis ===
The ancestral cyanobacteria that led to chloroplasts probably had a genome that contained over 3000 genes, but only approximately 100 genes remain in contemporary chloroplast genomes. These genes code for a variety of things, mostly to do with the protein pipeline and photosynthesis. As in prokaryotes, genes in chloroplast DNA are organized into operons. Unlike prokaryotic DNA molecules, chloroplast DNA molecules contain introns (plant mitochondrial DNAs do too, but not human mtDNAs).

Among land plants, the contents of the chloroplast genome are fairly similar.

==== Chloroplast genome reduction and gene transfer ====
Over time, many parts of the chloroplast genome were transferred to the nuclear genome of the host, a process called endosymbiotic gene transfer. As a result, the chloroplast genome is heavily reduced compared to that of free-living cyanobacteria. Chloroplasts may contain 60–100 genes whereas cyanobacteria often have more than 1500 genes in their genome. Recently, a plastid without a genome was found, demonstrating chloroplasts can lose their genome during endosymbiotic the gene transfer process.

Endosymbiotic gene transfer is how we know about the lost chloroplasts in many CASH lineages. Even if a chloroplast is eventually lost, the genes it donated to the former host's nucleus persist, providing evidence for the lost chloroplast's existence. For example, while diatoms (a heterokontophyte) now have a red algal derived chloroplast, the presence of many green algal genes in the diatom nucleus provide evidence that the diatom ancestor had a green algal derived chloroplast at some point, which was subsequently replaced by the red chloroplast.

In land plants, some 11–14% of the DNA in their nuclei can be traced back to the chloroplast, up to 18% in Arabidopsis, corresponding to about 4,500 protein-coding genes. There have been a few recent transfers of genes from the chloroplast DNA to the nuclear genome in land plants.

Of the approximately 3000 proteins found in chloroplasts, some 95% of them are encoded by nuclear genes. Many of the chloroplast's protein complexes consist of subunits from both the chloroplast genome and the host's nuclear genome. As a result, protein synthesis must be coordinated between the chloroplast and the nucleus. The chloroplast is mostly under nuclear control, though chloroplasts can also give out signals regulating gene expression in the nucleus, called retrograde signaling. Recent research indicates that parts of the retrograde signaling network once considered characteristic for land plants emerged already in an algal progenitor, integrating into co-expressed cohorts of genes in the closest algal relatives of land plants.

==== Protein synthesis ====
Protein synthesis within chloroplasts relies on two RNA polymerases. One is coded by the chloroplast DNA, the other is of nuclear origin. The two RNA polymerases may recognize and bind to different kinds of promoters within the chloroplast genome. The ribosomes in chloroplasts are similar to bacterial ribosomes.

=== Protein targeting and import ===
Because so many chloroplast genes have been moved to the nucleus, many proteins that would originally have been translated in the chloroplast are now synthesized in the cytoplasm of the plant cell. These proteins must be directed back to the chloroplast, and imported through at least two chloroplast membranes.

Curiously, around half of the protein products of transferred genes aren't even targeted back to the chloroplast. Many became exaptations, taking on new functions like participating in cell division, protein routing, and even disease resistance. A few chloroplast genes found new homes in the mitochondrial genome—most became nonfunctional pseudogenes, though a few tRNA genes still work in the mitochondrion. Some transferred chloroplast DNA protein products get directed to the secretory pathway, though many secondary plastids are bounded by an outermost membrane derived from the host's cell membrane, and therefore topologically outside of the cell because to reach the chloroplast from the cytosol, the cell membrane must be crossed, which signifies entrance into the extracellular space. In those cases, chloroplast-targeted proteins do initially travel along the secretory pathway.

Because the cell acquiring a chloroplast already had mitochondria (and peroxisomes, and a cell membrane for secretion), the new chloroplast host had to develop a unique protein targeting system to avoid having chloroplast proteins being sent to the wrong organelle.

The two ends of a polypeptide are called the N-terminus, or amino end, and the C-terminus, or carboxyl end. This polypeptide has four amino acids linked together. At the left is the N-terminus, with its amino (H_{2}N) group in green. The blue C-terminus, with its carboxyl group (CO_{2}H) is at the right.

In most, but not all cases, nuclear-encoded chloroplast proteins are translated with a cleavable transit peptide that's added to the N-terminus of the protein precursor. Sometimes the transit sequence is found on the C-terminus of the protein, or within the functional part of the protein.

==== Transport proteins and membrane translocons ====
After a chloroplast polypeptide is synthesized on a ribosome in the cytosol, an enzyme specific to chloroplast proteins phosphorylates, or adds a phosphate group to many (but not all) of them in their transit sequences. Phosphorylation helps many proteins bind the polypeptide, keeping it from folding prematurely. This is important because it prevents chloroplast proteins from assuming their active form and carrying out their chloroplast functions in the wrong place—the cytosol. At the same time, they have to keep just enough shape so that they can be recognized by the chloroplast. These proteins also help the polypeptide get imported into the chloroplast.

From here, chloroplast proteins bound for the stroma must pass through two protein complexes—the TOC complex, or translocon on the outer chloroplast membrane, and the TIC translocon, or translocon on the inner chloroplast membrane translocon. Chloroplast polypeptide chains probably often travel through the two complexes at the same time, but the TIC complex can also retrieve preproteins lost in the intermembrane space.

== Structure ==
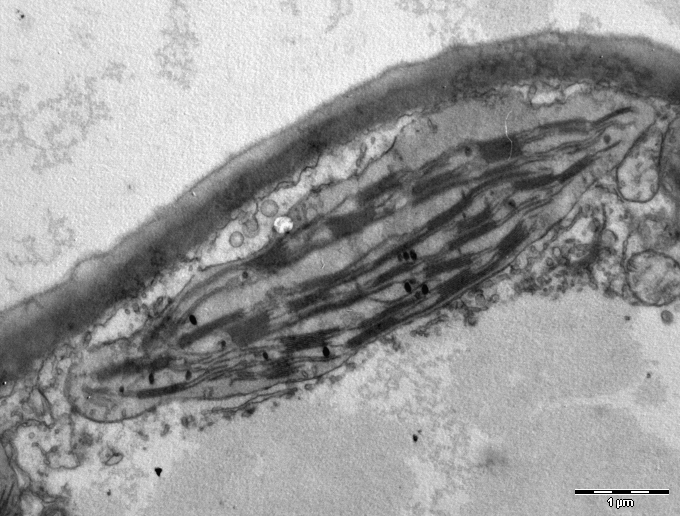
Transmission electron microscope image of a chloroplast. Grana of thylakoids and their connecting lamellae are clearly visible.

In land plants, chloroplasts are generally lens-shaped, 3–10 μm in diameter and 1–3 μm thick. Corn seedling chloroplasts are ≈20 μm^{3} in volume. Greater diversity in chloroplast shapes exists among the algae, which often contain a single chloroplast that can be shaped like a net (e.g., Oedogonium), a cup (e.g., Chlamydomonas), a ribbon-like spiral around the edges of the cell (e.g., Spirogyra), or slightly twisted bands at the cell edges (e.g., Sirogonium). Some algae have two chloroplasts in each cell; they are star-shaped in Zygnema, or may follow the shape of half the cell in order Desmidiales. In some algae, the chloroplast takes up most of the cell, with pockets for the nucleus and other organelles, for example, some species of Chlorella have a cup-shaped chloroplast that occupies much of the cell.

All chloroplasts have at least three membrane systems—the outer chloroplast membrane, the inner chloroplast membrane, and the thylakoid system. The two innermost lipid-bilayer membranes that surround all chloroplasts correspond to the outer and inner membranes of the ancestral cyanobacterium's gram negative cell wall, and not the phagosomal membrane from the host, which was probably lost. Chloroplasts that are the product of secondary endosymbiosis may have additional membranes surrounding these three. Inside the outer and inner chloroplast membranes is the chloroplast stroma, a semi-gel-like fluid that makes up much of a chloroplast's volume, and in which the thylakoid system floats.

Chloroplast ultrastructure. Chloroplasts have at least three distinct membrane systems, and a variety of things can be found in their stroma.

There are some common misconceptions about the outer and inner chloroplast membranes. The fact that chloroplasts are surrounded by a double membrane is often cited as evidence that they are the descendants of endosymbiotic cyanobacteria. This is often interpreted as meaning the outer chloroplast membrane is the product of the host's cell membrane infolding to form a vesicle to surround the ancestral cyanobacterium—which is not true—both chloroplast membranes are homologous to the cyanobacterium's original double membranes.

The chloroplast double membrane is also often compared to the mitochondrial double membrane. This is not a valid comparison—the inner mitochondria membrane is used to run proton pumps and carry out oxidative phosphorylation across to generate ATP energy. The only chloroplast structure that can be considered analogous to it is the internal thylakoid system. Even so, in terms of "in-out", the direction of chloroplast H^{+} ion flow is in the opposite direction compared to oxidative phosphorylation in mitochondria. In addition, in terms of function, the inner chloroplast membrane, which regulates metabolite passage and synthesizes some materials, has no counterpart in the mitochondrion.

=== Outer chloroplast membrane ===
The outer chloroplast membrane is a semi-porous membrane that small molecules and ions can easily diffuse across. However, it is not permeable to larger proteins, so chloroplast polypeptides being synthesized in the cell cytoplasm must be transported across the outer chloroplast membrane by the TOC complex, or translocon on the outer chloroplast membrane.

The chloroplast membranes sometimes protrude out into the cytoplasm, forming a stromule, or stroma-containing tubule. Stromules are very rare in chloroplasts, and are much more common in other plastids like chromoplasts and amyloplasts in petals and roots, respectively. They may exist to increase the chloroplast's surface area for cross-membrane transport, because they are often branched and tangled with the endoplasmic reticulum. When they were first observed in 1962, some plant biologists dismissed the structures as artifactual, claiming that stromules were just oddly shaped chloroplasts with constricted regions or dividing chloroplasts. However, there is a growing body of evidence that stromules are functional, integral features of plant cell plastids, not merely artifacts.

=== Intermembrane space and peptidoglycan wall ===
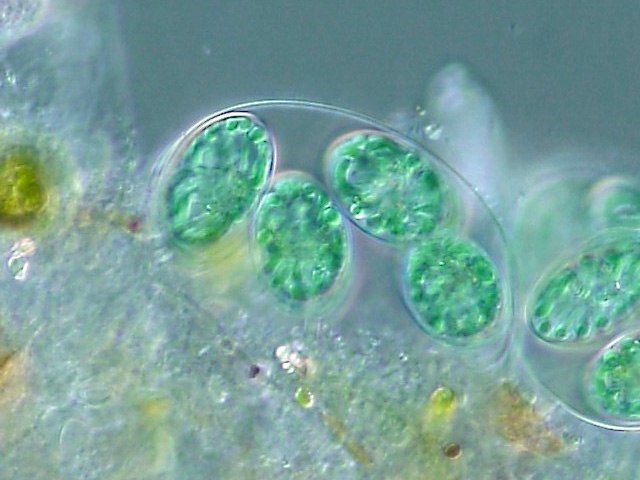
Instead of an intermembrane space, glaucophyte algae have a peptidoglycan wall between their inner and outer chloroplast membranes.

Usually, a thin intermembrane space about 10–20 nanometers thick exists between the outer and inner chloroplast membranes.

Glaucophyte algal chloroplasts have a peptidoglycan layer between the chloroplast membranes. It corresponds to the peptidoglycan cell wall of their cyanobacterial ancestors, which is located between their two cell membranes. These chloroplasts are called muroplasts (from Latin "mura", meaning "wall"). Other chloroplasts were assumed to have lost the cyanobacterial wall, leaving an intermembrane space between the two chloroplast envelope membranes, but has since been found also in moss, lycophytes and ferns.

=== Inner chloroplast membrane ===
The inner chloroplast membrane borders the stroma and regulates passage of materials in and out of the chloroplast. After passing through the TOC complex in the outer chloroplast membrane, polypeptides must pass through the TIC complex (translocon on the inner chloroplast membrane) which is located in the inner chloroplast membrane.

In addition to regulating the passage of materials, the inner chloroplast membrane is where fatty acids, lipids, and carotenoids are synthesized.

==== Peripheral reticulum ====
Some chloroplasts contain a structure called the chloroplast peripheral reticulum. It is often found in the chloroplasts of C_{4} plants, though it has also been found in some C_{3} angiosperms, and even some gymnosperms. The chloroplast peripheral reticulum consists of a maze of membranous tubes and vesicles continuous with the inner chloroplast membrane that extends into the internal stromal fluid of the chloroplast. Its purpose is thought to be to increase the chloroplast's surface area for cross-membrane transport between its stroma and the cell cytoplasm. The small vesicles sometimes observed may serve as transport vesicles to shuttle stuff between the thylakoids and intermembrane space.

=== Stroma ===
The protein-rich, alkaline, aqueous fluid within the inner chloroplast membrane and outside of the thylakoid space is called the stroma, which corresponds to the cytosol of the original cyanobacterium. Nucleoids of chloroplast DNA, chloroplast ribosomes, the thylakoid system with plastoglobuli, starch granules, and many proteins can be found floating around in it. The Calvin cycle, which fixes CO_{2} into G3P takes place in the stroma.

==== Chloroplast ribosomes ====
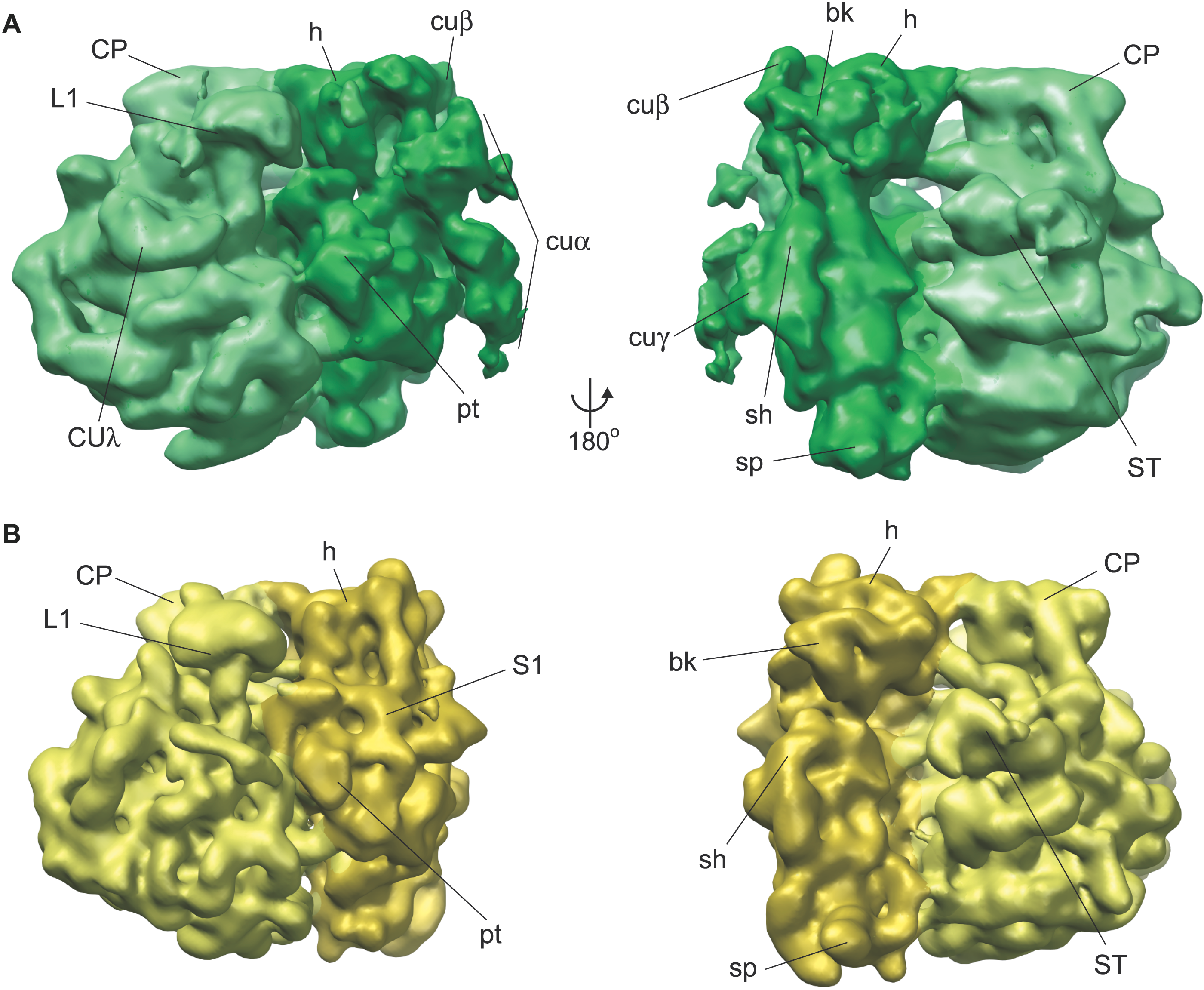
Chloroplast ribosomes Comparison of a chloroplast ribosome (green) and a bacterial ribosome (yellow). Important features common to both ribosomes and chloroplast-unique features are labeled.

Chloroplasts have their own ribosomes, which they use to synthesize a small fraction of their proteins. Chloroplast ribosomes are about two-thirds the size of cytoplasmic ribosomes (around 17 nm vs 25 nm). They take mRNAs transcribed from the chloroplast DNA and translate them into protein. While similar to bacterial ribosomes, chloroplast translation is more complex than in bacteria, so chloroplast ribosomes include some chloroplast-unique features.

Small subunit ribosomal RNAs in several Chlorophyta and euglenid chloroplasts lack motifs for Shine-Dalgarno sequence recognition, which is considered essential for translation initiation in most chloroplasts and prokaryotes. Such loss is also rarely observed in other plastids and prokaryotes. An additional 4.5S rRNA with homology to the 3' tail of 23S is found in "higher" plants.

==== Plastoglobuli ====
Plastoglobuli (singular plastoglobulus, sometimes spelled plastoglobule(s)), are spherical bubbles of lipids and proteins about 45–60 nanometers across. They are surrounded by a lipid monolayer. Plastoglobuli are found in all chloroplasts, but become more common when the chloroplast is under oxidative stress, or when it ages and transitions into a gerontoplast. Plastoglobuli also exhibit a greater size variation under these conditions. They are also common in etioplasts, but decrease in number as the etioplasts mature into chloroplasts.

Plastoglobuli contain both structural proteins and enzymes involved in lipid synthesis and metabolism. They contain many types of lipids including plastoquinone, vitamin E, carotenoids and chlorophylls.

Plastoglobuli were once thought to be free-floating in the stroma, but it is now thought that they are permanently attached either to a thylakoid or to another plastoglobulus attached to a thylakoid, a configuration that allows a plastoglobulus to exchange its contents with the thylakoid network. In normal green chloroplasts, the vast majority of plastoglobuli occur singularly, attached directly to their parent thylakoid. In old or stressed chloroplasts, plastoglobuli tend to occur in linked groups or chains, still always anchored to a thylakoid.

Plastoglobuli form when a bubble appears between the layers of the lipid bilayer of the thylakoid membrane, or bud from existing plastoglobuli—though they never detach and float off into the stroma. Practically all plastoglobuli form on or near the highly curved edges of the thylakoid disks or sheets. They are also more common on stromal thylakoids than on granal ones.

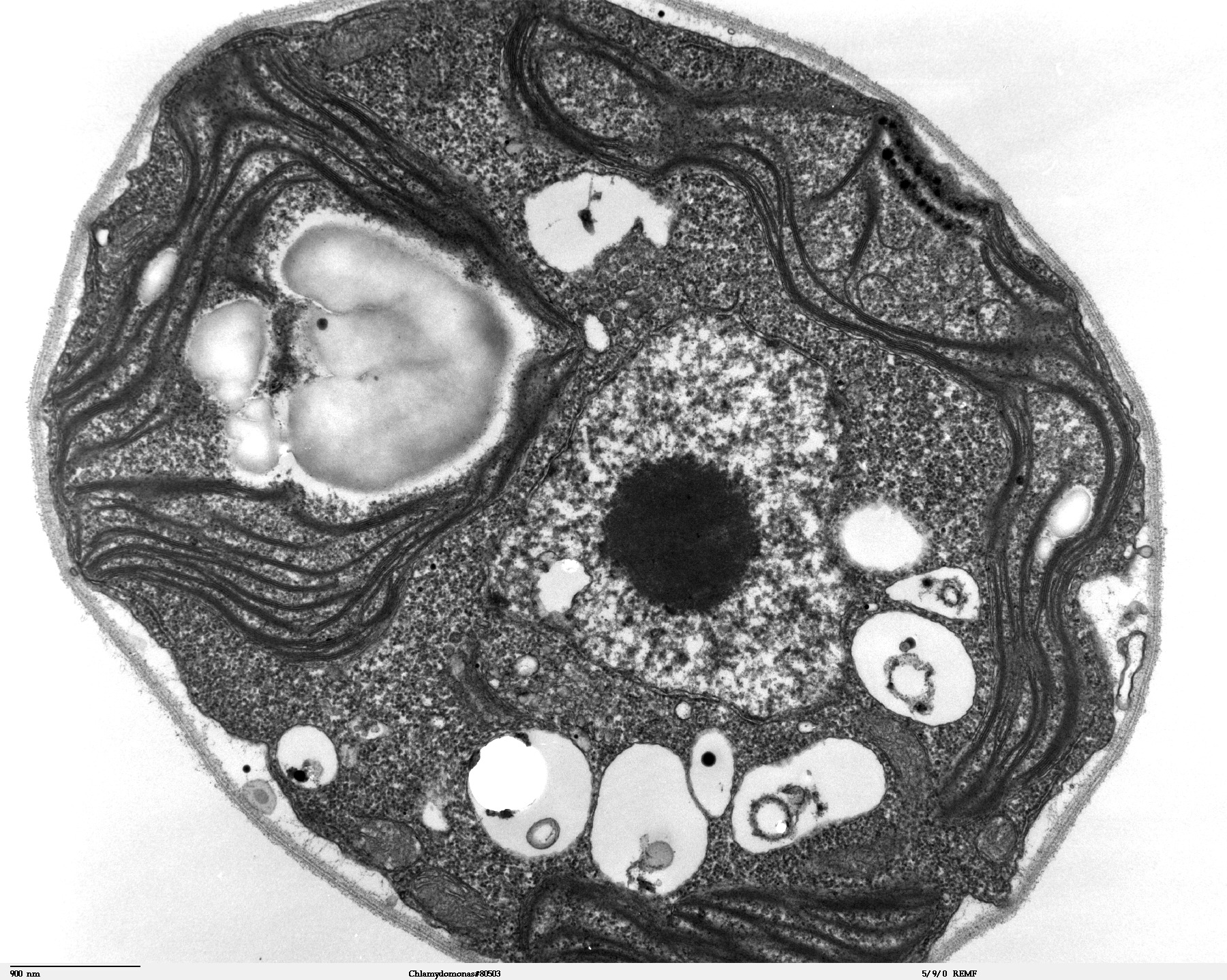
Transmission electron micrograph of Chlamydomonas reinhardtii, a green alga that contains a pyrenoid surrounded by starch.

==== Starch granules ====
Starch granules are very common in chloroplasts, typically taking up 15% of the organelle's volume, though in some other plastids like amyloplasts, they can be big enough to distort the shape of the organelle. Starch granules are simply accumulations of starch in the stroma, and are not bounded by a membrane.

Starch granules appear and grow throughout the day, as the chloroplast synthesizes sugars, and are consumed at night to fuel respiration and continue sugar export into the phloem, though in mature chloroplasts, it is rare for a starch granule to be completely consumed or for a new granule to accumulate.

Starch granules vary in composition and location across different chloroplast lineages. In red algae, starch granules are found in the cytoplasm rather than in the chloroplast. In C_{4} plants, mesophyll chloroplasts, which do not synthesize sugars, lack starch granules.

==== RuBisCO ====
RuBisCO, shown here in a space-filling model, is the main enzyme responsible for carbon fixation in chloroplasts.
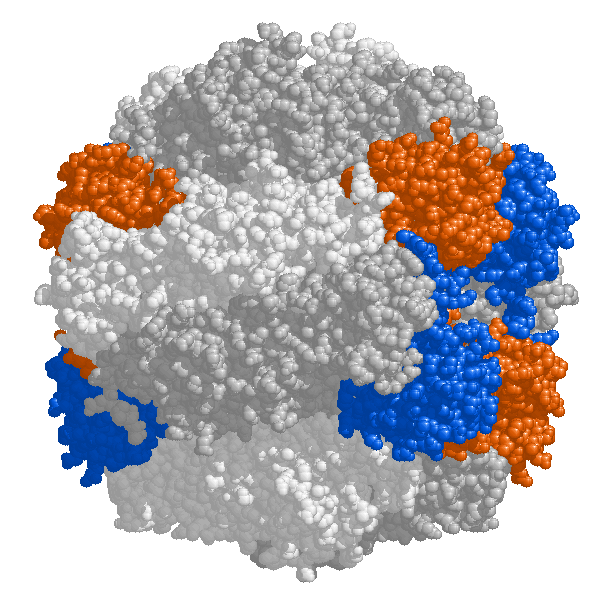

The chloroplast stroma contains many proteins, though the most common and important is RuBisCO, which is probably also the most abundant protein on the planet. RuBisCO is the enzyme that fixes CO_{2} into sugar molecules. In C_{3} plants, RuBisCO is abundant in all chloroplasts, though in C_{4} plants, it is confined to the bundle sheath chloroplasts, where the Calvin cycle is carried out in C_{4} plants.

=== Pyrenoids ===
The chloroplasts of some hornworts and algae contain structures called pyrenoids. They are not found in higher plants. Pyrenoids are roughly spherical and highly refractive bodies which are a site of starch accumulation in plants that contain them. They consist of a matrix opaque to electrons, surrounded by two hemispherical starch plates. The starch is accumulated as the pyrenoids mature. In algae with carbon concentrating mechanisms, the enzyme RuBisCO is found in the pyrenoids. Starch can also accumulate around the pyrenoids when CO_{2} is scarce. Pyrenoids can divide to form new pyrenoids, or be produced "de novo".

=== Thylakoid system ===
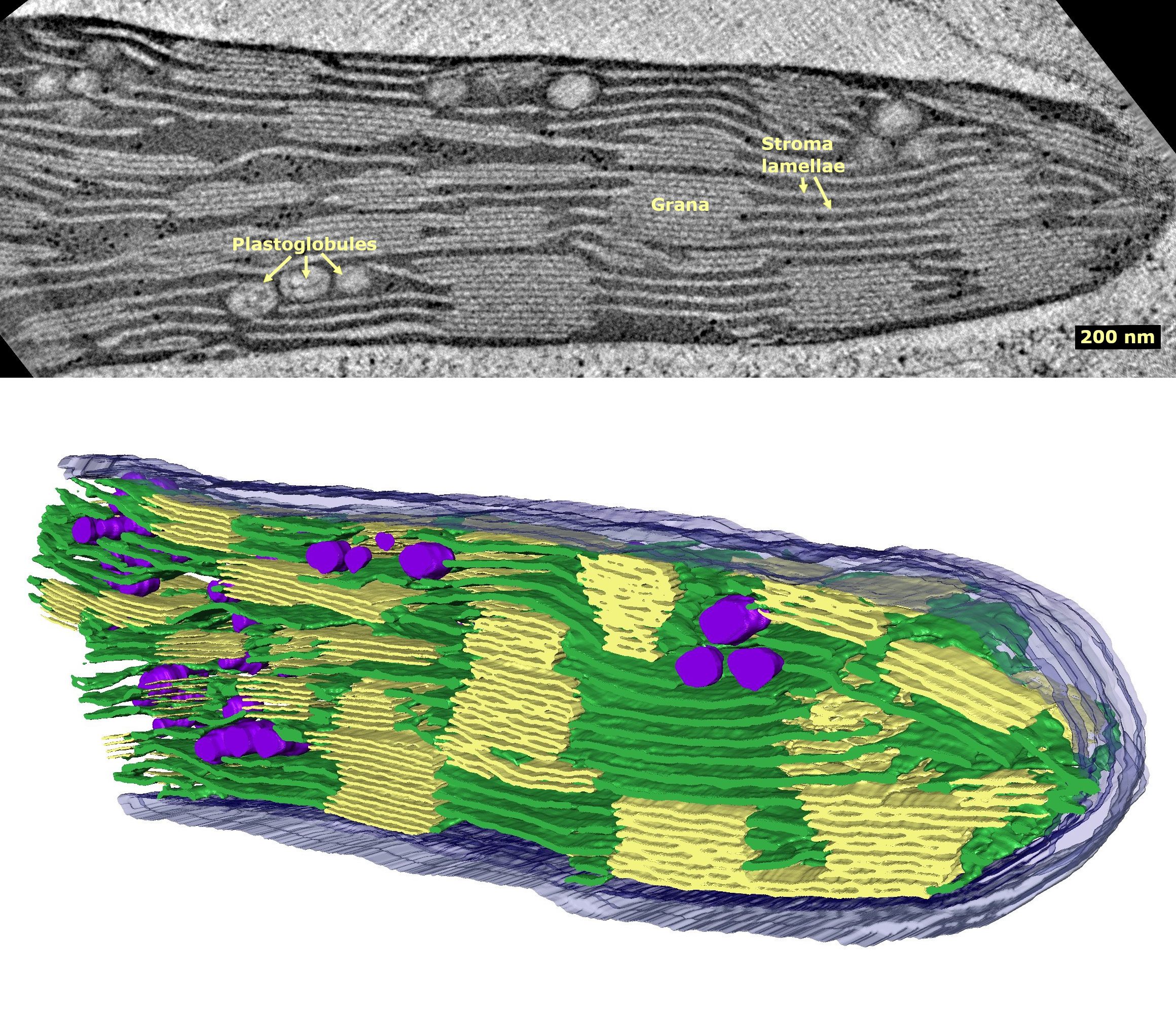
Scanning transmission electron microscope imaging of a chloroplast (Top) 10-nm-thick STEM tomographic slice of a lettuce chloroplast. Grana stacks are interconnected by unstacked stromal thylakoids, called "stroma lamellae". Round inclusions associated with the thylakoids are plastoglobules. Scalebar=200 nm. See. (Bottom) Large-scale 3D model generated from segmentation of tomographic reconstructions by STEM. grana=yellow; stroma lamellae=green; plastoglobules=purple; chloroplast envelope=blue. See.

Thylakoids (sometimes spelled thylakoïds), are small interconnected sacks which contain the membranes that the light reactions of photosynthesis take place on. The word thylakoid comes from the Greek word thylakos which means "sack".

Suspended within the chloroplast stroma is the thylakoid system, a highly dynamic collection of membranous sacks called thylakoids where chlorophyll is found and the light reactions of photosynthesis happen. In most vascular plant chloroplasts, the thylakoids are arranged in stacks called grana, though in certain C_{4} plant chloroplasts and some algal chloroplasts, the thylakoids are free floating.

==== Thylakoid structure ====
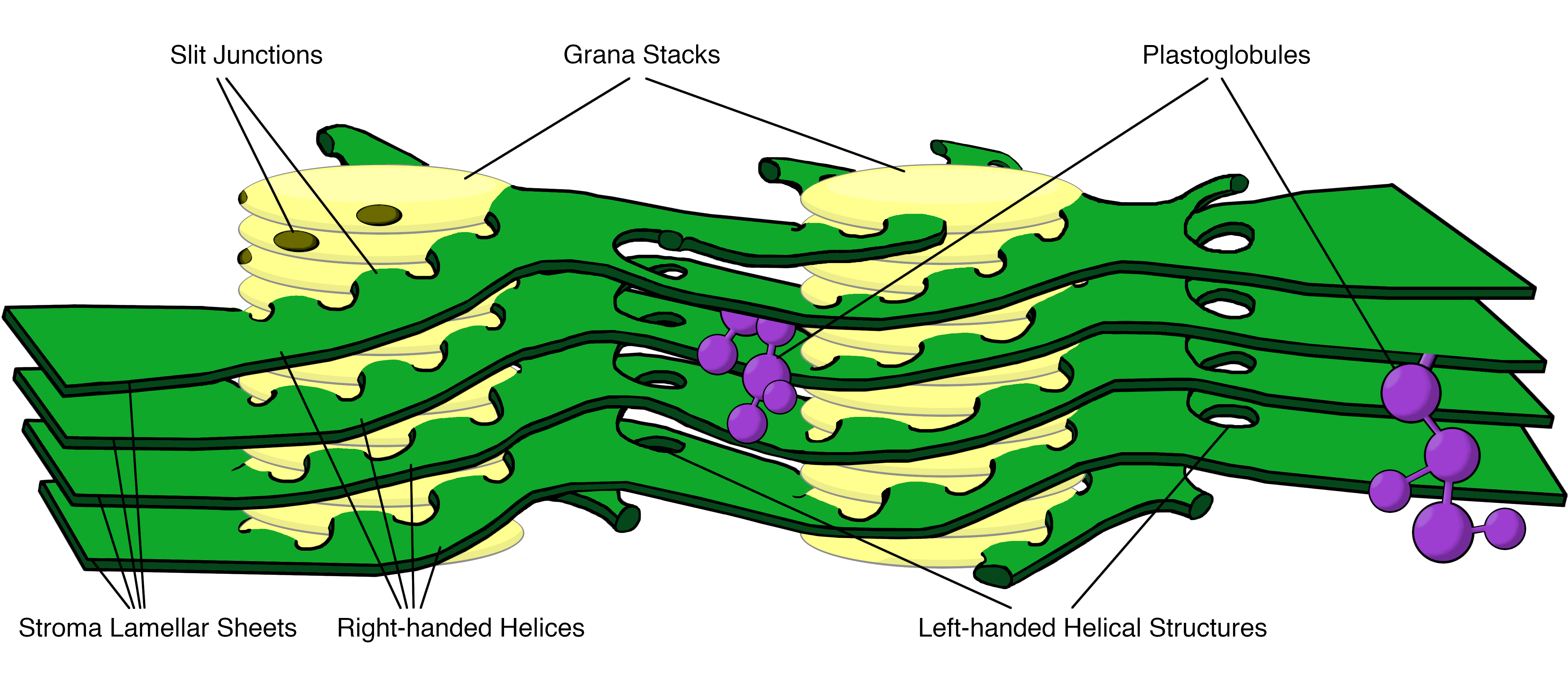
Granum-stroma assembly structure The prevailing model of the granum-stroma assembly is stacks of granal thylakoids wrapped by right-handed helical stromal thylakoids which are connected to large parallel sheets of stromal thylakoids and adjacent right-handed helices by left-handed helical structures. (Based on).

Using a light microscope, it is just barely possible to see tiny green granules—which were named grana. With electron microscopy, it became possible to see the thylakoid system in more detail, revealing it to consist of stacks of flat thylakoids which made up the grana, and long interconnecting stromal thylakoids which linked different grana. In the transmission electron microscope, thylakoid membranes appear as alternating light-and-dark bands, 8.5 nanometers thick.

The three-dimensional structure of the thylakoid membrane system has been disputed. Many models have been proposed, the most prevalent being the helical model, in which granum stacks of thylakoids are wrapped by helical stromal thylakoids. Another model known as the 'bifurcation model', which was based on the first electron tomography study of plant thylakoid membranes, depicts the stromal membranes as wide lamellar sheets perpendicular to the grana columns which bifurcates into multiple parallel discs forming the granum-stroma assembly. The helical model was supported by several additional works, but ultimately it was determined in 2019 that features from both the helical and bifurcation models are consolidated by newly discovered left-handed helical membrane junctions. Likely for ease, the thylakoid system is still commonly depicted by older "hub and spoke" models where the grana are connected to each other by tubes of stromal thylakoids.

Grana consist of stacks of flattened circular granal thylakoids that resemble pancakes. Each granum can contain anywhere from two to a hundred thylakoids, though grana with 10–20 thylakoids are most common. Wrapped around the grana are multiple parallel right-handed helical stromal thylakoids, also known as frets or lamellar thylakoids. The helices ascend at an angle of ~20°, connecting to each granal thylakoid at a bridge-like slit junction.

The stroma lamellae extend as large sheets perpendicular to the grana columns. These sheets are connected to the right-handed helices either directly or through bifurcations that form left-handed helical membrane surfaces. The left-handed helical surfaces have a similar tilt angle to the right-handed helices (~20°), but ¼ the pitch. Approximately 4 left-handed helical junctions are present per granum, resulting in a pitch-balanced array of right- and left-handed helical membrane surfaces of different radii and pitch that consolidate the network with minimal surface and bending energies. While different parts of the thylakoid system contain different membrane proteins, the thylakoid membranes are continuous and the thylakoid space they enclose form a single continuous labyrinth.

==== Thylakoid composition ====
Embedded in the thylakoid membranes are important protein complexes which carry out the light reactions of photosynthesis. Photosystem II and photosystem I contain light-harvesting complexes with chlorophyll and carotenoids that absorb light energy and use it to energize electrons. Molecules in the thylakoid membrane use the energized electrons to pump hydrogen ions into the thylakoid space, decreasing the pH and turning it acidic. ATP synthase is a large protein complex that harnesses the concentration gradient of the hydrogen ions in the thylakoid space to generate ATP energy as the hydrogen ions flow back out into the stroma—much like a dam turbine.

There are two types of thylakoids—granal thylakoids, which are arranged in grana, and stromal thylakoids, which are in contact with the stroma. Granal thylakoids are pancake-shaped circular disks about 300–600 nanometers in diameter. Stromal thylakoids are helicoid sheets that spiral around grana. The flat tops and bottoms of granal thylakoids contain only the relatively flat photosystem II protein complex. This allows them to stack tightly, forming grana with many layers of tightly appressed membrane, called granal membrane, increasing stability and surface area for light capture.

In contrast, photosystem I and ATP synthase are large protein complexes which jut out into the stroma. They can't fit in the appressed granal membranes, and so are found in the stromal thylakoid membrane—the edges of the granal thylakoid disks and the stromal thylakoids. These large protein complexes may act as spacers between the sheets of stromal thylakoids.

The number of thylakoids and the total thylakoid area of a chloroplast is influenced by light exposure. Shaded chloroplasts contain larger and more grana with more thylakoid membrane area than chloroplasts exposed to bright light, which have smaller and fewer grana and less thylakoid area. Thylakoid extent can change within minutes of light exposure or removal.

=== Pigments and chloroplast colors ===
Inside the photosystems embedded in chloroplast thylakoid membranes are various photosynthetic pigments, which absorb and transfer light energy. The types of pigments found are different in various groups of chloroplasts, and are responsible for a wide variety of chloroplast colorations. Other plastid types, such as the leucoplast and the chromoplast, contain little chlorophyll and do not carry out photosynthesis.

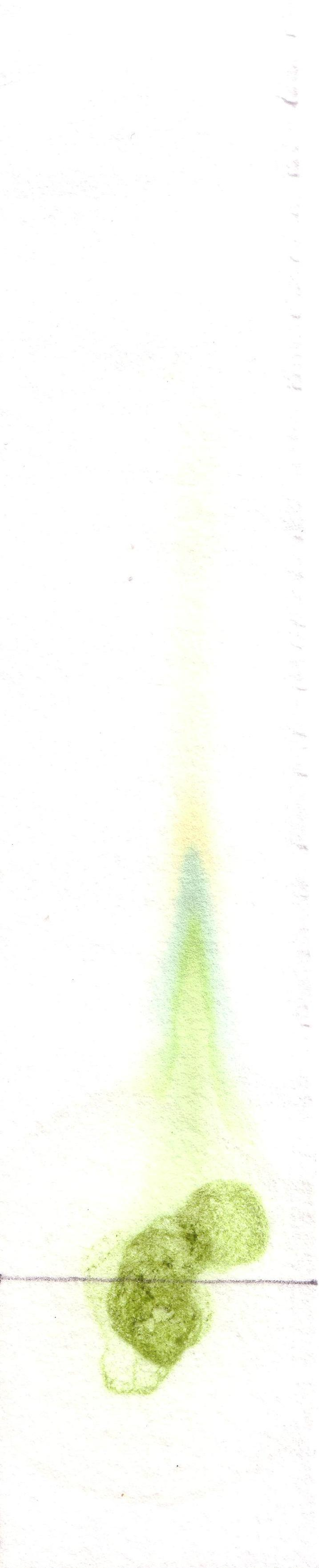

==== Chlorophylls ====
Chlorophyll a is found in all chloroplasts, as well as their cyanobacterial ancestors. Chlorophyll a is a blue-green pigment partially responsible for giving most cyanobacteria and chloroplasts their color. Other forms of chlorophyll exist, such as the accessory pigments chlorophyll b, chlorophyll c, chlorophyll d, and chlorophyll f.

Chlorophyll b is an olive green pigment found only in the chloroplasts of plants, green algae, any secondary chloroplasts obtained through the secondary endosymbiosis of a green alga, and a few cyanobacteria. It is the chlorophylls a and b together that make most plant and green algal chloroplasts green.

Chlorophyll c is mainly found in secondary endosymbiotic chloroplasts that originated from a red alga, although it is not found in chloroplasts of red algae themselves. Chlorophyll c is also found in some green algae and cyanobacteria.

Chlorophylls d and f are pigments found only in some cyanobacteria.

==== Carotenoids ====
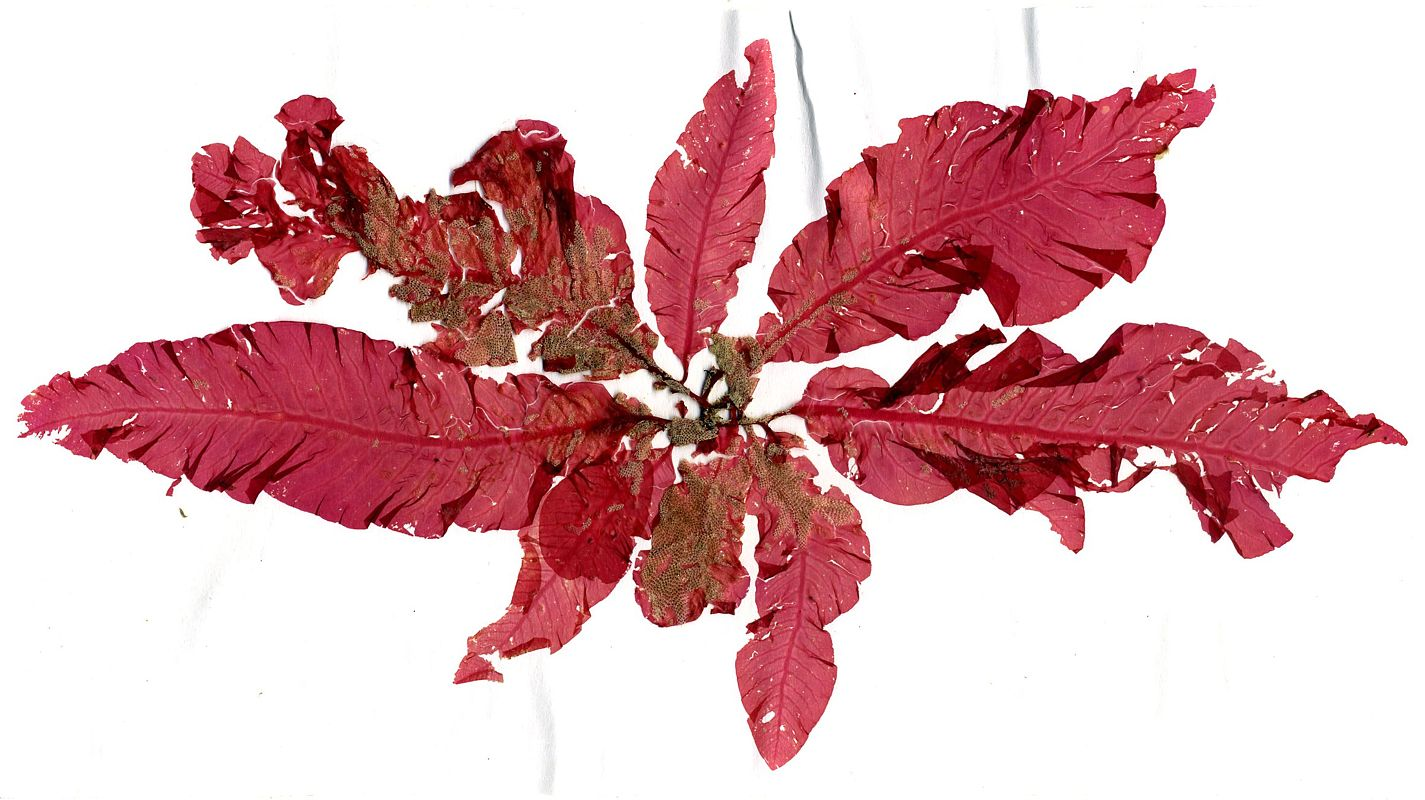
Delesseria sanguinea, a red alga, has chloroplasts that contain red pigments like phycoerytherin that mask their blue-green chlorophyll a.

In addition to chlorophylls, another group of yellow–orange pigments called carotenoids are also found in the photosystems. There are about thirty photosynthetic carotenoids. They help transfer and dissipate excess energy, and their bright colors sometimes override the chlorophyll green, like during the fall, when the leaves of some land plants change color. β-carotene is a bright red-orange carotenoid found in nearly all chloroplasts, like chlorophyll a. Xanthophylls, especially the orange-red zeaxanthin, are also common. Many other forms of carotenoids exist that are only found in certain groups of chloroplasts.

==== Phycobilins ====
Phycobilins are a third group of pigments found in cyanobacteria, and glaucophyte, red algal, and cryptophyte chloroplasts. Phycobilins come in all colors, though phycoerytherin is one of the pigments that makes many red algae red. Phycobilins often organize into relatively large protein complexes about 40 nanometers across called phycobilisomes. Like photosystem I and ATP synthase, phycobilisomes jut into the stroma, preventing thylakoid stacking in red algal chloroplasts. Cryptophyte chloroplasts and some cyanobacteria don't have their phycobilin pigments organized into phycobilisomes, and keep them in their thylakoid space instead.

Photosynthetic pigments. Presence of pigments across chloroplast groups and cyanobacteria.

Colored cells represent pigment presence. Chl = chlorophyll

Chl a
Chl b
Chl c
Chl d and f
Xanthophylls
α-carotene
β-carotene
Phycobilins
Land plants

Green algae

Euglenophytes and
Chlorarachniophytes

Multicellular red algae

Unicellular red algae

Haptophytes and
Dinophytes

Cryptophytes

Glaucophytes

Cyanobacteria

=== Specialized chloroplasts in C_{4} plants ===
Many C_{4} plants have their mesophyll cells and bundle sheath cells arranged radially around their leaf veins. The two types of cells contain different types of chloroplasts specialized for a particular part of photosynthesis.

To fix carbon dioxide into sugar molecules in the process of photosynthesis, chloroplasts use an enzyme called RuBisCO. RuBisCO has trouble distinguishing between carbon dioxide and oxygen, so at high oxygen concentrations, RuBisCO starts accidentally adding oxygen to sugar precursors. This has the result of ATP energy being wasted and CO_{2} being released, all with no sugar being produced. This is a big problem, since O_{2} is produced by the initial light reactions of photosynthesis, causing issues down the line in the Calvin cycle which uses RuBisCO.

C_{4} plants evolved a way to solve this—by spatially separating the light reactions and the Calvin cycle. The light reactions, which store light energy in ATP and NADPH, are done in the mesophyll cells of a C_{4} leaf. The Calvin cycle, which uses the stored energy to make sugar using RuBisCO, is done in the bundle sheath cells, a layer of cells surrounding a vein in a leaf.

As a result, chloroplasts in C_{4} mesophyll cells and bundle sheath cells are specialized for each stage of photosynthesis. In mesophyll cells, chloroplasts are specialized for the light reactions, so they lack RuBisCO, and have normal grana and thylakoids, which they use to make ATP and NADPH, as well as oxygen. They store CO_{2} in a four-carbon compound, which is why the process is called C_{4} photosynthesis. The four-carbon compound is then transported to the bundle sheath chloroplasts, where it drops off CO_{2} and returns to the mesophyll. Bundle sheath chloroplasts do not carry out the light reactions, preventing oxygen from building up in them and disrupting RuBisCO activity. Because of this, they lack thylakoids organized into grana stacks—though bundle sheath chloroplasts still have free-floating thylakoids in the stroma where they still carry out cyclic electron flow, a light-driven method of synthesizing ATP to power the Calvin cycle without generating oxygen. They lack photosystem II, and only have photosystem I—the only protein complex needed for cyclic electron flow. Because the job of bundle sheath chloroplasts is to carry out the Calvin cycle and make sugar, they often contain large starch grains.

Both types of chloroplast contain large amounts of chloroplast peripheral reticulum, which they use to get more surface area to transport stuff in and out of them. Mesophyll chloroplasts have a little more peripheral reticulum than bundle sheath chloroplasts.

== Function and chemistry ==
=== Guard cell chloroplasts ===
Unlike most epidermal cells, the guard cells of plant stomata contain relatively well-developed chloroplasts. However, exactly what they do is controversial.

=== Plant innate immunity ===
Plants lack specialized immune cells—all plant cells participate in the plant immune response. Chloroplasts, along with the nucleus, cell membrane, and endoplasmic reticulum, are key players in pathogen defense. Due to its role in a plant cell's immune response, pathogens frequently target the chloroplast.

Plants have two main immune responses—the hypersensitive response, in which infected cells seal themselves off and undergo programmed cell death, and systemic acquired resistance, where infected cells release signals warning the rest of the plant of a pathogen's presence. Chloroplasts stimulate both responses by purposely damaging their photosynthetic system, producing reactive oxygen species. High levels of reactive oxygen species will cause the hypersensitive response. The reactive oxygen species also directly kill any pathogens within the cell. Lower levels of reactive oxygen species initiate systemic acquired resistance, triggering defense-molecule production in the rest of the plant.

In some plants, chloroplasts are known to move closer to the infection site and the nucleus during an infection.

Chloroplasts can serve as cellular sensors. After detecting stress in a cell, which might be due to a pathogen, chloroplasts begin producing molecules like salicylic acid, jasmonic acid, nitric oxide and reactive oxygen species which can serve as defense-signals. As cellular signals, reactive oxygen species are unstable molecules, so they probably don't leave the chloroplast, but instead pass on their signal to an unknown second messenger molecule. All these molecules initiate retrograde signaling—signals from the chloroplast that regulate gene expression in the nucleus.

In addition to defense signaling, chloroplasts, with the help of the peroxisomes, help synthesize an important defense molecule, jasmonate. Chloroplasts synthesize all the fatty acids in a plant cell—linoleic acid, a fatty acid, is a precursor to jasmonate.

=== Photosynthesis ===
One of the main functions of the chloroplast is its role in photosynthesis, the process by which light is transformed into chemical energy, to subsequently produce food in the form of sugars. Water (H_{2}O) and carbon dioxide (CO_{2}) are used in photosynthesis, and sugar and oxygen (O_{2}) are made, using light energy. Photosynthesis is divided into two stages—the light reactions, where water is split to produce oxygen, and the dark reactions, or Calvin cycle, which builds sugar molecules from carbon dioxide. The two phases are linked by the energy carriers adenosine triphosphate (ATP) and nicotinamide adenine dinucleotide phosphate (NADP^{+}).

==== Light reactions ====
The light reactions of photosynthesis take place across the thylakoid membranes.

The light reactions take place on the thylakoid membranes. They take light energy and store it in NADPH, a form of NADP^{+}, and ATP to fuel the dark reactions.

===== Energy carriers =====
ATP is the phosphorylated version of adenosine diphosphate (ADP), which stores energy in a cell and powers most cellular activities. ATP is the energized form, while ADP is the (partially) depleted form. NADP^{+} is an electron carrier which ferries high energy electrons. In the light reactions, it gets reduced, meaning it picks up electrons, becoming NADPH.

===== Photophosphorylation =====
Like mitochondria, chloroplasts use the potential energy stored in an H^{+}, or hydrogen ion, gradient to generate ATP energy. The two photosystems capture light energy to energize electrons taken from water, and release them down an electron transport chain. The molecules between the photosystems harness the electrons' energy to pump hydrogen ions into the thylakoid space, creating a concentration gradient, with more hydrogen ions (up to a thousand times as many) inside the thylakoid system than in the stroma. The hydrogen ions in the thylakoid space then diffuse back down their concentration gradient, flowing back out into the stroma through ATP synthase. ATP synthase uses the energy from the flowing hydrogen ions to phosphorylate adenosine diphosphate into adenosine triphosphate, or ATP. Because chloroplast ATP synthase projects out into the stroma, the ATP is synthesized there, in position to be used in the dark reactions.

===== NADP^{+} reduction =====
Electrons are often removed from the electron transport chains to charge NADP^{+} with electrons, reducing it to NADPH. Like ATP synthase, ferredoxin-NADP^{+} reductase, the enzyme that reduces NADP^{+}, releases the NADPH it makes into the stroma, right where it is needed for the dark reactions.

Because NADP^{+} reduction removes electrons from the electron transport chains, they must be replaced—the job of photosystem II, which splits water molecules (H_{2}O) to obtain the electrons from its hydrogen atoms.

===== Cyclic photophosphorylation =====
While photosystem II photolyzes water to obtain and energize new electrons, photosystem I simply reenergizes depleted electrons at the end of an electron transport chain. Normally, the reenergized electrons are taken by NADP^{+}, though sometimes they can flow back down more H^{+}-pumping electron transport chains to transport more hydrogen ions into the thylakoid space to generate more ATP. This is termed cyclic photophosphorylation because the electrons are recycled. Cyclic photophosphorylation is common in C_{4} plants, which need more ATP than NADPH.

==== Dark reactions ====
The Calvin cycle. The Calvin cycle incorporates carbon dioxide into sugar molecules.

The Calvin cycle, also known as the dark reactions, is a series of biochemical reactions that fixes CO_{2} into G3P sugar molecules and uses the energy and electrons from the ATP and NADPH made in the light reactions. The Calvin cycle takes place in the stroma of the chloroplast.

While named "the dark reactions", in most plants, they take place in the light, since the dark reactions are dependent on the products of the light reactions.

===== Carbon fixation and G3P synthesis =====
The Calvin cycle starts by using the enzyme RuBisCO to fix CO_{2} into five-carbon Ribulose bisphosphate (RuBP) molecules. The result is unstable six-carbon molecules that immediately break down into three-carbon molecules called 3-phosphoglyceric acid, or 3-PGA. The ATP and NADPH made in the light reactions is used to convert the 3-PGA into glyceraldehyde-3-phosphate, or G3P sugar molecules. Most of the G3P molecules are recycled back into RuBP using energy from more ATP, but one out of every six produced leaves the cycle—the end product of the dark reactions.

===== Sugars and starches =====
Sucrose is made up of a glucose monomer (left), and a fructose monomer (right).

Glyceraldehyde-3-phosphate can double up to form larger sugar molecules like glucose and fructose. These molecules are processed, and from them, the still larger sucrose, a disaccharide commonly known as table sugar, is made, though this process takes place outside of the chloroplast, in the cytoplasm.

Alternatively, glucose monomers in the chloroplast can be linked together to make starch, which accumulates into the starch grains found in the chloroplast. Under conditions such as high atmospheric CO_{2} concentrations, these starch grains may grow very large, distorting the grana and thylakoids. The starch granules displace the thylakoids, but leave them intact. Waterlogged roots can also cause starch buildup in the chloroplasts, possibly due to less sucrose being exported out of the chloroplast (or more accurately, the plant cell). This depletes a plant's free phosphate supply, which indirectly stimulates chloroplast starch synthesis. While linked to low photosynthesis rates, the starch grains themselves may not necessarily interfere significantly with the efficiency of photosynthesis, and might simply be a side effect of another photosynthesis-depressing factor.

===== Photorespiration =====
Photorespiration can occur when the oxygen concentration is too high. RuBisCO cannot distinguish between oxygen and carbon dioxide very well, so it can accidentally add O_{2} instead of CO_{2} to RuBP. This process reduces the efficiency of photosynthesis—it consumes ATP and oxygen, releases CO_{2}, and produces no sugar. It can waste up to half the carbon fixed by the Calvin cycle. Several mechanisms have evolved in different lineages that raise the carbon dioxide concentration relative to oxygen within the chloroplast, increasing the efficiency of photosynthesis. These mechanisms are called carbon dioxide concentrating mechanisms, or CCMs. These include Crassulacean acid metabolism, C_{4} carbon fixation, and pyrenoids. Chloroplasts in C_{4} plants are notable as they exhibit a distinct chloroplast dimorphism.

=== pH ===
Because of the H^{+} gradient across the thylakoid membrane, the interior of the thylakoid is acidic, with a pH around 4, while the stroma is slightly basic, with a pH of around 8. The optimal stroma pH for the Calvin cycle is 8.1, with the reaction nearly stopping when the pH falls below 7.3.

CO_{2} in water can form carbonic acid, which can disturb the pH of isolated chloroplasts, interfering with photosynthesis, even though CO_{2} is used in photosynthesis. However, chloroplasts in living plant cells are not affected by this as much.

Chloroplasts can pump K^{+} and H^{+} ions in and out of themselves using a poorly understood light-driven transport system.

In the presence of light, the pH of the thylakoid lumen can drop up to 1.5 pH units, while the pH of the stroma can rise by nearly one pH unit.

=== Amino acid synthesis ===
Chloroplasts alone make almost all of a plant cell's amino acids in their stroma except the sulfur-containing ones like cysteine and methionine. Cysteine is made in the chloroplast (the proplastid too) but it is also synthesized in the cytosol and mitochondria, probably because it has trouble crossing membranes to get to where it is needed. The chloroplast is known to make the precursors to methionine but it is unclear whether the organelle carries out the last leg of the pathway or if it happens in the cytosol.

=== Other nitrogen compounds ===
Chloroplasts make all of a cell's purines and pyrimidines—the nitrogenous bases found in DNA and RNA. They also convert nitrite (NO_{2}^{−}) into ammonia (NH_{3}) which supplies the plant with nitrogen to make its amino acids and nucleotides.

=== Other chemical products ===
The plastid is the site of diverse and complex lipid synthesis in plants. The carbon used to form the majority of the lipid is from acetyl-CoA, which is the decarboxylation product of pyruvate. Pyruvate may enter the plastid from the cytosol by passive diffusion through the membrane after production in glycolysis. Pyruvate is also made in the plastid from phosphoenolpyruvate, a metabolite made in the cytosol from pyruvate or PGA. Acetate in the cytosol is unavailable for lipid biosynthesis in the plastid. The typical length of fatty acids produced in the plastid are 16 or 18 carbons, with 0-3 cis double bonds.

The biosynthesis of fatty acids from acetyl-CoA primarily requires two enzymes. Acetyl-CoA carboxylase creates malonyl-CoA, used in both the first step and the extension steps of synthesis. Fatty acid synthase (FAS) is a large complex of enzymes and cofactors including acyl carrier protein (ACP) which holds the acyl chain as it is synthesized. The initiation of synthesis begins with the condensation of malonyl-ACP with acetyl-CoA to produce ketobutyryl-ACP. 2 reductions involving the use of NADPH and one dehydration creates butyryl-ACP. Extension of the fatty acid comes from repeated cycles of malonyl-ACP condensation, reduction, and dehydration.

Other lipids are derived from the methyl-erythritol phosphate (MEP) pathway and consist of gibberelins, sterols, abscisic acid, phytol, and innumerable secondary metabolites.

== Location ==
A cross section of a leaf, showing chloroplasts in its mesophyll cells. Stomal guard cells also have chloroplasts, though much fewer than mesophyll cells.

=== Distribution in a plant ===
Not all cells in a multicellular plant contain chloroplasts. All green parts of a plant contain chloroplasts as the color comes from the chlorophyll. The plant cells which contain chloroplasts are usually parenchyma cells, though chloroplasts can also be found in collenchyma tissue. A plant cell which contains chloroplasts is known as a chlorenchyma cell. A typical chlorenchyma cell of a land plant contains about 10 to 100 chloroplasts.

In some plants such as cacti, chloroplasts are found in the stems, though in most plants, chloroplasts are concentrated in the leaves. One square millimeter of leaf tissue can contain half a million chloroplasts. Within a leaf, chloroplasts are mainly found in the mesophyll layers of a leaf, and the guard cells of stomata. Palisade mesophyll cells can contain 30–70 chloroplasts per cell, while stomatal guard cells contain only around 8–15 per cell, as well as much less chlorophyll. Chloroplasts can also be found in the bundle sheath cells of a leaf, especially in C_{4} plants, which carry out the Calvin cycle in their bundle sheath cells. They are often absent from the epidermis of a leaf.

=== Cellular location ===
When chloroplasts are exposed to direct sunlight, they stack along the anticlinal cell walls to minimize exposure. In the dark they spread out in sheets along the periclinal walls to maximize light absorption.

==== Chloroplast movement ====
The chloroplasts of plant and algal cells can orient themselves to best suit the available light. In low-light conditions, they will spread out in a sheet—maximizing the surface area to absorb light. Under intense light, they will seek shelter by aligning in vertical columns along the plant cell's cell wall or turning sideways so that light strikes them edge-on. This reduces exposure and protects them from photooxidative damage. This ability to distribute chloroplasts so that they can take shelter behind each other or spread out may be the reason why land plants evolved to have many small chloroplasts instead of a few big ones. Chloroplast movement is considered one of the most closely regulated stimulus-response systems that can be found in plants. Mitochondria have also been observed to follow chloroplasts as they move.

In higher plants, chloroplast movement is run by phototropins, blue light photoreceptors also responsible for plant phototropism. In some algae, mosses, ferns, and flowering plants, chloroplast movement is influenced by red light in addition to blue light, though very long red wavelengths inhibit movement rather than speeding it up. Blue light generally causes chloroplasts to seek shelter, while red light draws them out to maximize light absorption.

Studies of Vallisneria gigantea, an aquatic flowering plant, have shown that chloroplasts can get moving within five minutes of light exposure, though they don't initially show any net directionality. They may move along microfilament tracks, and the fact that the microfilament mesh changes shape to form a honeycomb structure surrounding the chloroplasts after they have moved suggests that microfilaments may help to anchor chloroplasts in place.

== Differentiation, replication, and inheritance ==

Plastid types (interactive diagram). Plants contain many different kinds of plastids in their cells.

Chloroplasts are a special type of a plant cell organelle called a plastid, though the two terms are sometimes used interchangeably. There are many other types of plastids, which carry out various functions. All chloroplasts in a plant are descended from undifferentiated proplastids found in the zygote, or fertilized egg. Proplastids are commonly found in an adult plant's apical meristems. Chloroplasts do not normally develop from proplastids in root tip meristems—instead, the formation of starch-storing amyloplasts is more common.

In shoots, proplastids from shoot apical meristems can gradually develop into chloroplasts in photosynthetic leaf tissues as the leaf matures, if exposed to the required light. This process involves invaginations of the inner plastid membrane, forming sheets of membrane that project into the internal stroma. These membrane sheets then fold to form thylakoids and grana.

If angiosperm shoots are not exposed to the required light for chloroplast formation, proplastids may develop into an etioplast stage before becoming chloroplasts. An etioplast is a plastid that lacks chlorophyll, and has inner membrane invaginations that form a lattice of tubes in their stroma, called a prolamellar body. While etioplasts lack chlorophyll, they have a yellow chlorophyll precursor stocked. Within a few minutes of light exposure, the prolamellar body begins to reorganize into stacks of thylakoids, and chlorophyll starts to be produced. This process, where the etioplast becomes a chloroplast, takes several hours. Gymnosperms do not require light to form chloroplasts.

Light, however, does not guarantee that a proplastid will develop into a chloroplast. Whether a proplastid develops into a chloroplast some other kind of plastid is mostly controlled by the nucleus and is largely influenced by the kind of cell it resides in.

Many plastid interconversions are possible.

=== Plastid interconversion ===
Plastid differentiation is not permanent, in fact many interconversions are possible. Chloroplasts may be converted to chromoplasts, which are pigment-filled plastids responsible for the bright colors seen in flowers and ripe fruit. Starch storing amyloplasts can also be converted to chromoplasts, and it is possible for proplastids to develop straight into chromoplasts. Chromoplasts and amyloplasts can also become chloroplasts, like what happens when a carrot or a potato is illuminated. If a plant is injured, or something else causes a plant cell to revert to a meristematic state, chloroplasts and other plastids can turn back into proplastids. Chloroplast, amyloplast, chromoplast, proplastid are not absolute; state—intermediate forms are common.

=== Division ===
Most chloroplasts in a photosynthetic cell do not develop directly from proplastids or etioplasts. In fact, a typical shoot meristematic plant cell contains only 7–20 proplastids. These proplastids differentiate into chloroplasts, which divide to create the 30–70 chloroplasts found in a mature photosynthetic plant cell. If the cell divides, chloroplast division provides the additional chloroplasts to partition between the two daughter cells.

In single-celled algae, chloroplast division is the only way new chloroplasts are formed. There is no proplastid differentiation—when an algal cell divides, its chloroplast divides along with it, and each daughter cell receives a mature chloroplast.

Almost all chloroplasts in a cell divide, rather than a small group of rapidly dividing chloroplasts. Chloroplasts have no definite S-phase—their DNA replication is not synchronized or limited to that of their host cells. Much of what we know about chloroplast division comes from studying organisms like Arabidopsis and the red alga Cyanidioschyzon merolæ.

Most chloroplasts in plant cells, and all chloroplasts in algae arise from chloroplast division. Picture references,

The division process starts when the proteins FtsZ1 and FtsZ2 assemble into filaments, and with the help of a protein ARC6, form a structure called a Z-ring within the chloroplast's stroma. The Min system manages the placement of the Z-ring, ensuring that the chloroplast is cleaved more or less evenly. The protein MinD prevents FtsZ from linking up and forming filaments. Another protein ARC3 may also be involved, but it is not very well understood. These proteins are active at the poles of the chloroplast, preventing Z-ring formation there, but near the center of the chloroplast, MinE inhibits them, allowing the Z-ring to form.

Next, the two plastid-dividing rings, or PD rings form. The inner plastid-dividing ring is located in the inner side of the chloroplast's inner membrane, and is formed first. The outer plastid-dividing ring is found wrapped around the outer chloroplast membrane. It consists of filaments about 5 nanometers across, arranged in rows 6.4 nanometers apart, and shrinks to squeeze the chloroplast. This is when chloroplast constriction begins.
In a few species like Cyanidioschyzon merolæ, chloroplasts have a third plastid-dividing ring located in the chloroplast's intermembrane space.

Late into the constriction phase, dynamin proteins assemble around the outer plastid-dividing ring, helping provide force to squeeze the chloroplast. Meanwhile, the Z-ring and the inner plastid-dividing ring break down. During this stage, the many chloroplast DNA plasmids floating around in the stroma are partitioned and distributed to the two forming daughter chloroplasts.

Later, the dynamins migrate under the outer plastid dividing ring, into direct contact with the chloroplast's outer membrane, to cleave the chloroplast in two daughter chloroplasts.

A remnant of the outer plastid dividing ring remains floating between the two daughter chloroplasts, and a remnant of the dynamin ring remains attached to one of the daughter chloroplasts.

Of the five or six rings involved in chloroplast division, only the outer plastid-dividing ring is present for the entire constriction and division phase—while the Z-ring forms first, constriction does not begin until the outer plastid-dividing ring forms.

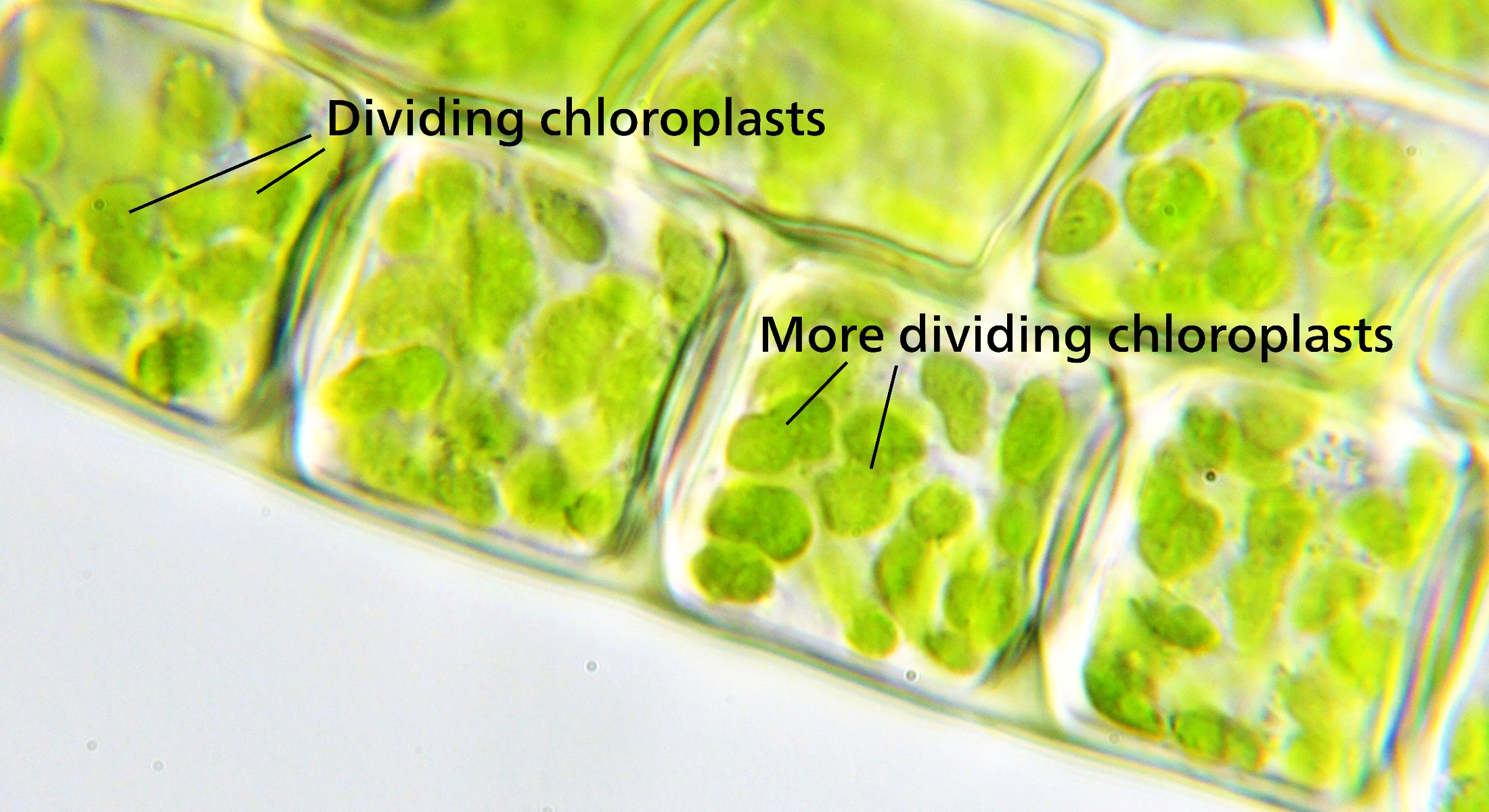
Chloroplast division In this light micrograph of some moss chloroplasts, many dumbbell-shaped chloroplasts can be seen dividing. Grana are also just barely visible as small granules.

==== Regulation ====
In species of algae that contain a single chloroplast, regulation of chloroplast division is extremely important to ensure that each daughter cell receives a chloroplast—chloroplasts can't be made from scratch. In organisms like plants, whose cells contain multiple chloroplasts, coordination is looser and less important. It is likely that chloroplast and cell division are somewhat synchronized, though the mechanisms for it are mostly unknown.

Light has been shown to be a requirement for chloroplast division. Chloroplasts can grow and progress through some of the constriction stages under poor quality green light, but are slow to complete division—they require exposure to bright white light to complete division. Spinach leaves grown under green light have been observed to contain many large dumbbell-shaped chloroplasts. Exposure to white light can stimulate these chloroplasts to divide and reduce the population of dumbbell-shaped chloroplasts.

=== Chloroplast inheritance ===
Like mitochondria, chloroplasts are usually inherited from a single parent. Biparental chloroplast inheritance—where plastid genes are inherited from both parent plants—occurs in very low levels in some flowering plants.

Many mechanisms prevent biparental chloroplast DNA inheritance, including selective destruction of chloroplasts or their genes within the gamete or zygote, and chloroplasts from one parent being excluded from the embryo. Parental chloroplasts can be sorted so that only one type is present in each offspring.

Gymnosperms, such as pine trees, mostly pass on chloroplasts paternally, while flowering plants often inherit chloroplasts maternally. Flowering plants were once thought to only inherit chloroplasts maternally. However, there are now many documented cases of angiosperms inheriting chloroplasts paternally.

Angiosperms, which pass on chloroplasts maternally, have many ways to prevent paternal inheritance. Most of them produce sperm cells that do not contain any plastids. There are many other documented mechanisms that prevent paternal inheritance in these flowering plants, such as different rates of chloroplast replication within the embryo.

Among angiosperms, paternal chloroplast inheritance is observed more often in hybrids than in offspring from parents of the same species. This suggests that incompatible hybrid genes might interfere with the mechanisms that prevent paternal inheritance.

==== Transplastomic plants ====
Recently, chloroplasts have caught attention by developers of genetically modified crops. Since, in most flowering plants, chloroplasts are not inherited from the male parent, transgenes in these plastids cannot be disseminated by pollen. This makes plastid transformation a valuable tool for the creation and cultivation of genetically modified plants that are biologically contained, thus posing significantly lower environmental risks. This biological containment strategy is therefore suitable for establishing the coexistence of conventional and organic agriculture. While the reliability of this mechanism has not yet been studied for all relevant crop species, recent results in tobacco plants are promising, showing a failed containment rate of transplastomic plants at 3 in 1,000,000.
