= Schimper =

Schimper is a surname. Notable people with the surname include:

- Andreas Franz Wilhelm Schimper (1856–1901), botanist and phytogeographer
- Georg Wilhelm Schimper (1804–1878), German botanist and naturalist, born in Reichenschwand
- Karl Friedrich Schimper (1803–1867), German naturalist and poet
- Wilhelm Philippe Schimper (1808–1880), German-French botanist, born in Dossenheim-sur-Zinsel, a town near the River Rhine
