= BioSystems =

Monthly peer-reviewed scientific journal

- Discipline: Systems biology, evolution, computer modeling, information processing
- Language: English
- Edited by: Abir Igamberdiev

Publication details
- Former names: Currents in Modern Biology; Currents in Modern Biology: Bio Systems
- History: 1967–present
- Publisher: Elsevier
- Frequency: Monthly
- Impact factor: 2.0 (2023)

Standard abbreviations
- ISO 4: BioSystems

Indexing
- CODEN: BSYMBO
- ISSN: 0303-2647
- LCCN: sf91091174
- OCLC no.: 780558853

Links
- Journal homepage; Online archive

BioSystems is a monthly peer-reviewed scientific journal covering experimental, computational, and theoretical research that links biology, evolution, and the information processing sciences. It was established in 1967 as Currents in Modern Biology by Robert G. Grenell and published by North-Holland Publishing Company out of Amsterdam until North-Holland merged with Elsevier in 1970. Grenell wrote of his purpose in founding the journal,

It has become necessary to develop a new language of biology; a new mathematics, and to strip biological theory and experiment of their classical approaches, assumptions and limitations. It is such considerations which underlie the establishment of this journal.

In 1972 the journal was renamed Currents in Modern Biology: Bio Systems, which was shortened to BioSystems in 1974. Previous editors include J.P. Schadé, Alan W. Schwartz, Sidney W. Fox, Michael Conrad, Lynn Margulis, David B. Fogel, Gary B. Fogel, George Kampis, Francisco Lara-Ochoa, Koichiro Matsuno, Ray Paton, and W. Mike L. Holcombe.

According to the Journal Citation Reports, the journal has a 2023 impact factor of 2.0.

== Special issues ==
Special issues of BioSystems cover different aspects of theoretical and evolutionary biology.

=== Symbiogenesis ===
The special issue "Symbiogenesis and Progressive Evolution" (2021) is dedicated to Boris Kozo-Polyansky and Lynn Margulis and contains articles about these scientists, and also includes an annotated translation of the article by Konstantin Merezhkovsky, in which the concept of symbiogenesis was first outlined.

- Mikhailovsky, George; Gordon, Richard; Igamberdiev, Abir U. (2021). "Editorial: Symbiogenesis and progressive evolution". Biosystems. 206. Bibcode:2021BiSys.20604429M. doi:10.1016/j.biosystems.2021.104429. PMID 33864879.
- Kowallik, Klaus V.; Martin, William F. (2021). "The origin of symbiogenesis: An annotated English translation of Mereschkowsky's 1910 paper on the theory of two plasma lineages". Biosystems. 199. Bibcode:2021BiSys.19904281K. doi:10.1016/j.biosystems.2020.104281. PMC 7816216. PMID 33279568.
- Sagan, Dorion (2021). "From Empedocles to Symbiogenetics: Lynn Margulis's revolutionary influence on evolutionary biology". Biosystems. 204. Bibcode:2021BiSys.20404386S. doi:10.1016/j.biosystems.2021.104386. PMID 33621579.

=== Biological computation ===
The special issue "Fundamental principles of biological computation: From molecular computing to biological complexity" (2022) is dedicated to the memory of one of the founders of computational biology Efim Liberman and contains his autobiography "On the way to a new science".

- Shklovskiy-Kordi, Nikita E.; Matsuno, Koichiro; Marijuán, Pedro C.; Igamberdiev, Abir U. (2022). "Editorial: Fundamental principles of biological computation: From molecular computing to evolutionary complexity". Biosystems. 219. Bibcode:2022BiSys.21904719S. doi:10.1016/j.biosystems.2022.104719.

=== Biological thermodynamics ===
The special issue "Biological Thermodynamics: Bridging the gap between physics and life" (2024) is dedicated to Ervin Bauer and contains biographical and theoretical articles about him, as well as English translations of his major works.

- Igamberdiev, Abir U.; Müller, Miklós; Elek, Gábor; Mikhailovsky, George E.; Cottam, Ron (2024). "Biological thermodynamics: Bridging the gap between physics and life". Biosystems. 242. Bibcode:2024BiSys.24205258I. doi:10.1016/j.biosystems.2024.105258. PMID 38880329.
- Müller, Miklós; Igamberdiev, Abir U. (2024). "The emergence of theoretical biology: Two fundamental works of Ervin Bauer (1890–1938) in English translation". Biosystems. 241. Bibcode:2024BiSys.24105201M. doi:10.1016/j.biosystems.2024.105201. PMID 38642880.

== Some other significant papers and articles ==
- Miller, William B.; Baluška, František; Reber, Arthur S.; Slijepčević, Predrag (2025). "Biological mechanisms contradict AI consciousness: The spaces between the notes". Biosystems. 247. Bibcode:2025BiSys.24705387M. doi:10.1016/j.biosystems.2024.105387.

== Abstracting and indexing ==
The journal is abstracted and indexed in:

- Aquatic Sciences and Fisheries Abstracts
- Biological Abstracts
- BIOSIS Previews
- CAB Abstracts
- Chemical Abstracts Service
- EBSCO databases
- Embase
- EMBiology
- FRANCIS
- GEOBASE
- Index Medicus/MEDLINE/PubMed
- Inspec
- PASCAL
- Science Citation Index
- Scopus
- The Zoological Record
