= Endogenosymbiosis =

Evolutionary process

Endogenosymbiosis is an evolutionary process, proposed by the evolutionary and environmental biologist Roberto Cazzolla Gatti, in which "gene carriers" (viruses, retroviruses and bacteriophages) and symbiotic prokaryotic cells (bacteria or archaea) could share parts or all of their genomes in an endogenous symbiotic relationship with their hosts.

== Context ==
The related process of symbiogenesis or endosymbiosis was proposed by Lynn Margulis in 1967. She argued that the internal symbiosis of bacteria-like organisms had formed organelles like chloroplasts and mitochondria. She proposed that this had created the eukaryotes, and thus driven the expansion of life on Earth. She had argued that this process of symbiotic collaboration had run alongside the classical Darwinian cycle of mutation, natural selection and adaptation.

== Genetic symbiosis from parasites ==
Roberto Cazzolla Gatti, Ph.D., associate professor at Tomsk State University (Russia), argued in his hypothesis that "the main likely cause of the evolution of sexual reproduction, the parasitism, also represents the origin of biodiversity". In other terms, this theory suggests that sexual reproduction acts as a conservative system against the inclusion of new genetic variations into cells' DNA (supported by the DNA repair systems) and, instead, the evolution of species can take place only when this preservative system fails to contrast the inclusion, within the host genome, of hexogen parts of DNA (and RNA) coming from obliged "parasitic" elements (viruses and phages) that establish a symbiosis with their hosts. "As two parallel evolutionary lines – Cazzolla Gatti wrote in his original paper – sexual reproduction seems to preserve what the endogenosymbiosis moves to diversify. Following the former process, the species can adapt slowly and indefinitely to the external factors, adjusting themselves, but not 'creating' novelty. The latter process, instead, leads to the speciation due to sudden changes in genes sequences. Not only organelles can be symbiotic with other cells, as suggested Lynn Margulis, but entire pieces of genetic material coming from symbiotic parasites, can be included in the host DNA, changing the gene expression and addressing the speciation process".

This idea challenges the canonical natural selection models based on the gradualism of the mutation-adaptation pattern, providing more support to the punctuated equilibrium theory proposed by Stephen Jay Gould and Niles Eldredge.

== Evidence ==
Two independent studies provide support for the hypothesis. Jamie E. Henzy and Welkin E. Johnson demonstrated that the complex evolutionary history of the IFIT (Interferon Induced proteins with Tetratricopeptide repeats) family of antiviral genes has been shaped by continuous interactions between mammalian hosts and their many viruses.

David Enard and colleagues estimated that viruses have driven close to 30% of all adaptive amino acid changes in the part of the human proteome conserved within mammals. Their results suggest that viruses are one of the most dominant drivers of evolutionary change across mammalian and human proteomes.

Previously, it was estimated that about 7–8% percent of the entire human genome carry about 100,000 pieces of DNA that came from endogenous retroviruses. This may be an underestimate.

In 2016 the biologists Sarah R. Bordestein and Seth R. Bordestein reported that genes are frequently transferred between hosts and parasites. Eukaryotic genes are often co-opted by viruses and bacterial genes are commonly found in bacteriophages. The presence of bacteriophages in symbiotic bacteria that obligately reside in eukaryotes may promote eukaryotic DNA transfers to bacteriophages.
