= Abir Igamberdiev =

Russian-Canadian researcher (born 1959)

Abir Ubayevich Igamberdiev
- Абир Убаевич Игамбердиев
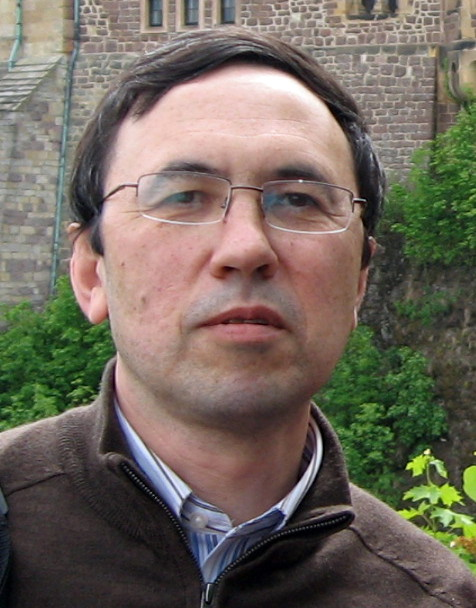
- Abir Igamberdiev at Wartburg castle (Germany) in 2011
- Born: 4 July 1959 (age 67); Alma-Ata, Kazakhstan
- Citizenship: Canada
- Education: Voronezh State University
- Known for: plant metabolism
- Scientific career
- Workplaces: Memorial University of Newfoundland
- Website: https://www.mun.ca/faculty/aigamberdiev/

Abir Ubayevich Igamberdiev (Russian: Абир Убаевич Игамбердиев, also known as Andrei Igamberdiev) (born 4 July 1959) is a Russian-Canadian theoretical biologist and plant scientist. He is professor at Memorial University of Newfoundland, Canada. He is most known for his research on organization of plant metabolism, for the conceptual development of foundations of theoretical biology, and for his works on history and philosophy of science.

== Early life and education ==
Igamberdiev was born in Alma-Ata (Kazakhstan) and lived in Voronezh (Russia) where he studied biology at Voronezh State University. He earned a PhD in biology from the same university in 1985 and a Doctor of Science degree at the Institute of Plant Physiology of the Russian Academy of Sciences in Moscow in 1992. In the 1990s he was a guest scientist at Umeå University (Sweden), Free University of Berlin (Germany), University of Wyoming (US), and Risø National Laboratory (Denmark). In 2002, he permanently moved to Canada where he worked at the University of Manitoba (Winnipeg) and then at the Memorial University of Newfoundland (St. John's, Newfoundland), where he is currently a professor at the Department of Biology.

== Professional activity ==
Igamberdiev has published over 250 peer-reviewed journal publications and several edited books. He currently is editor-in-chief of the Elsevier journal BioSystems and a subject editor of the Journal of Plant Physiology. Abir Igamberdiev's research focuses on the organization of metabolism, bioenergetics of plant cells, plant enzymology, plant adaptation to hypoxic stress, nitric oxide metabolism in plants and the role of plant hemoglobins, foundations of theoretical biology, natural philosophy, and dynamics of social systems.

Abir Igamberdiev has contributed to the characterization of metabolic pathways and enzymes of plant respiratory metabolism and to the discovery that plant mitochondria use nitrite as an alternative electron acceptor under anoxia (anaerobic respiration) and produce nitric oxide, which is scavenged by phytoglobin. He developed the concept of thermodynamic buffering in metabolism that supports stable non-equilibrium dynamics of living systems. He introduced the concept of internal quantum state of living systems that maintains their computational properties and determines morphogenesis and evolution. Evolution of social systems is viewed by Igamberdiev as a continuous generation and interaction of reflexive models of externality that trigger social dynamics and establish the structure of societies.

== Essays and works of fiction ==
Abir Igamberdiev is an author of short stories and essays on classical music, literature and philosophy in Russian.
