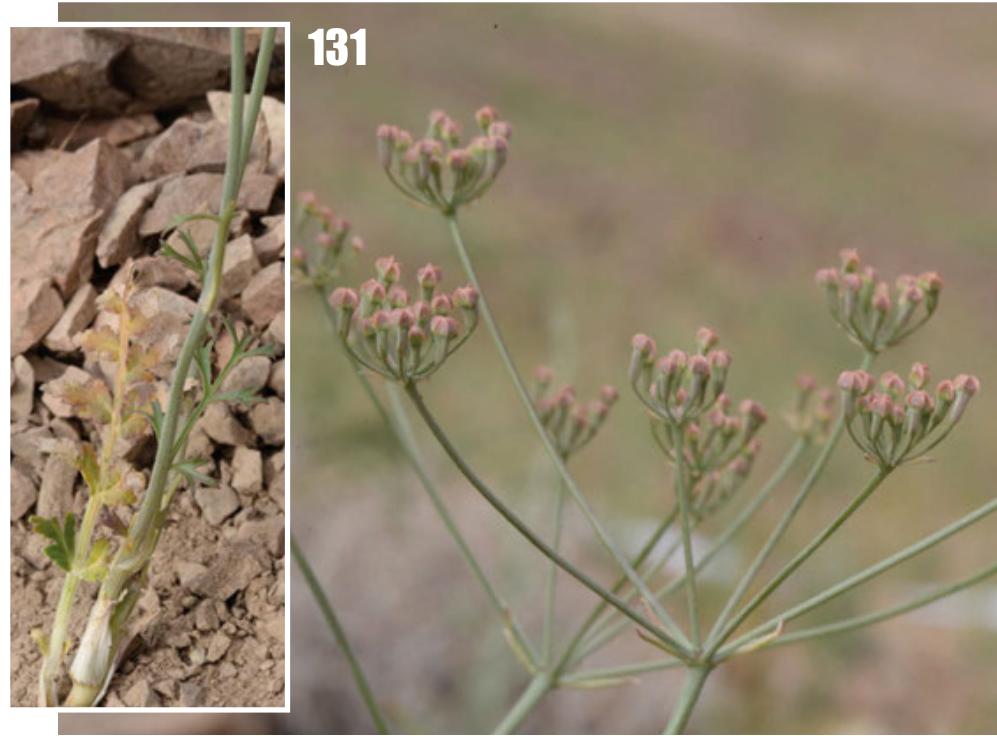
- Oedibasis apiculata

Scientific classification
- Kingdom: Plantae
- Clade: Embryophytes
- Clade: Tracheophytes
- Clade: Spermatophytes
- Clade: Angiosperms
- Clade: Eudicots
- Clade: Asterids
- Order: Apiales
- Family: Apiaceae
- Subfamily: Apioideae
- Tribe: Pyramidoptereae
- Genus: Oedibasis; Koso-Pol.

= Oedibasis =

Genus of plants

Oedibasis is a genus of flowering plants belonging to the family Apiaceae.

Its native range is Central Asia to Afghanistan.

Species:

- Oedibasis apiculata (Kar. & Kir.) Koso-Pol.
- Oedibasis pachyphylla Hedge & Lamond
- Oedibasis platycarpa (Lipsky) Koso-Pol.
- Oedibasis tamerlanii (Lipsky) Korovin ex Nevski
