= Paul Portier =

Paul Portier may refer to:

- Paul Portier (cinematographer)
- Paul Portier (physiologist)
