= Carex erythrorrhiza =

Scientific classification
- Kingdom: Plantae
- Clade: Tracheophytes
- Clade: Angiosperms
- Clade: Monocots
- Clade: Commelinids
- Order: Poales
- Family: Cyperaceae
- Genus: Carex
- Species: C. erythrorrhiza

Binomial name
- Carex erythrorrhiza Boeckeler

Species of plant

Carex erythrorrhiza is a tussock-forming species of perennial sedge in the family Cyperaceae. It is native to parts of Africa.

The species was first formally described by the botanist Johann Otto Boeckeler in 1875 as a part of the work Linnaea. The type specimen was collected in Ethiopia near Demerki and Debreski by Georg Wilhelm Schimper.

== See also ==
- List of Carex species
