= Boris Kozo-Polyansky =

Russian-Soviet botanist (1890–1957)

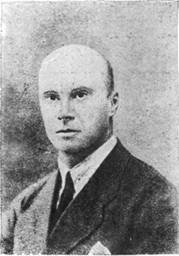
- Born: Boris Mikhailovich Kozo-Polyansky; 20 January 1890; Ashgabat, Transcaspian Oblast, Russian Empire
- Died: 21 April 1957 (aged 67); Voronezh, RSFSR, Soviet Union
- Education: Moscow University
- Known for: Endosymbiosis
- Awards: Order of Lenin (2 times); Order of the Red Banner of Labour; Medal "For Valiant Labour in the Great Patriotic War 1941–1945"; Corresponding Member of Academy of Sciences of the Soviet Union (1932)
- Scientific career
- Fields: Biology, botany
- Workplaces: Moscow University; Voronezh State University
- Author abbrev. (botany): Koso-Pol.

Boris Mikhailovich Kozo-Polyansky (Russian: Борис Михайлович Козо-Полянский; 20 January 1890 – 21 April 1957) was a Soviet and Russian botanist and evolutionary biologist, best known for his seminal work, Symbiogenesis: A New Principle of Evolution, which was the first work to place the theory of symbiogenesis into a Darwinian evolutionary context, as well as one of the first to redefine cell theory.

== Life ==
Boris Kozo-Polyansky was born in Ashgabat, which at the time was part of the Russian Empire. He relocated to Voronezh in his early youth. He graduated from Moscow University in 1914 at the age of 24, before returning to Voronezh where he worked as an assistant at Voronezh Agricultural University until 1918. In 1920 he then became a professor at Voronezh State University, where he taught for the remainder of his life and served as a Dean, Chair of Botany and Vice President of the University. He is buried in Voronezh at the Communist International (Comintern) Comintern Cemetery.

== Work on botany ==
Boris Kozo-Polyansky became a professor of botany at the University of Voronezh in 1920. His research and contribution to the field mostly focused on the phylogenetic taxonomy and morphology of higher plants. His research expounded upon and supported the euanthial origin of flowers (flowers coming from a shoot with modified leaves) and from this theory, he constructed an original phylogenetic system for angiosperms, and later for all terrestrial plant life. Additionally, He devised a new classification of umbellifers based on the anatomy of their fruit. Furthermore, during studies he conducted in the Timskaia Highland in Kursk Oblast, Kozo-Polyansky discovered an accumulation of relict plants.

Kozo-Polyansky published "Introduction to the phylogenetic systematics of higher plants", "Tea plants of Kazakhstan", and "The main biogenetic law from the botanical point of view" during his lifetime, and a fourth book on botany, "Course in the Systematics of Higher Plants", was published posthumously.

Kozo-Polyansky became the director of the Voronezh Botanical Gardens in 1937, which today are named in his honor.

== Evolutionary theory of symbiogenesis ==
Symbiogenesis, the theory which describes the endosymbiotic origin of Eukaryotic cells, which endocytosed smaller prokaryotes that later became DNA containing organelles such as mitochondria and plastids, was first suggested by Andreas Franz Wilhelm Schimper (1856 –1901) in his 1883 seminal paper: "On the development of chlorophyll grains and color bodies." However, the theory wasn't detailed in a substantial manner until Konstantin Mereschkowski (1855–1921) published his 1905 paper, "The nature and origins of chromatophores in the plant kingdom," where the term Symbiogenesis was first coined. It was in this academic landscape that Kozo-Polyansky pioneered the idea that symbiogenesis could be explained through the classical Darwinian notion of evolution, something his two predecessors failed to do. He first publicly related this theory in 1921 at the All Russian Congress of Russian Botanists in Petrograd.

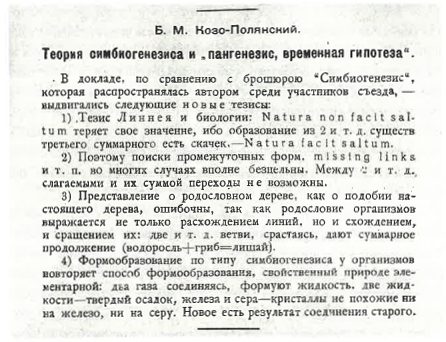
B. M. Kozo-Polyansky's abstract given to the All-Russian Congress of Russian Botanists in Petrograd 1921. Translation below.

Theory of symbiogenesis and ''Pangenesis, a Provisional Hypothesis.''" "My presentation will contain the following new statements (when compared to the "Symbiogenesis" brochure that I previously distributed to the participants of the Congress):

(1) The state Linnaeus and most biologist: ''Natura non facit saltum'' [N''ature does not make leaps''] is not correct since formation from two (or more) organisms of a third is a leap. ''Natura facit saltum'' [''Nature does make leaps'']

(2) Therefore, searches for intermediate forms, missing links [these two words given in English - Ed.], in many cases will be completely fruitless. Transitions are not possible between two (or more) components and their sum [a new life form].

(3) Representations of Origin [of a new life form] as a true [branching] tree are incorrect since the origins of a new organisms occur not only by divergence of the lineages but also by their convergence and fusion: two (or more) branches fuse [anastomose] and produce a summary issue (alga + fungus = lichen).

(4) Production of new forms of organisms through symbiogenesis reflects the way in which new forms are produced by the elements: two gases unite and form a liquid; two liquids form a solid residue; iron and sulfur form crystals resembling neither iron nor sulfur. The new [life form] is a result of [a permanent] combination of [two or more different] old [life forms].

— Boris Kozo-Polyansky, The New Principle of Biology- An Essay on the Theory of Symbiogenesis.

Yet, it wasn't until 1924, through the publication of Kozo-Polyansky's seminal work "The New Principle of Biology: An Essay on the Theory of Symbiogenesis," that the evolutionary context and importance of symbiogenesis was fully detailed for the first time.

In "The New Principle of Biology: An Essay on the Theory of Symbiogenesis" Kozo-Polyansky posited many novel theories and observations that had yet been developed by other biologists. The novel views that he proposed in the text, are the following:

1. Life arose before Eukaryotic Cells; from bioblasts, cytodes, and Cyanophyceae or simpler cells. These life forms (generally classified as prokaryotes today) were the closest descendants of the earliest life forms. Cytodes and bioblasts, are simpler than cells with nuclei yet still have all the properties of life. He noted the environmental impacts of bacteria with complex and unique metabolic pathways.
2. Cells are made up of sub-units called "organoids" (known as organelles today). The green photosynthetic sub-units originated as a Cyanophyceae, that were engulfed by larger cells and were able to form a symbiotic relationship with its host. This symbiogenesis led to the evolution of chloroplasts, and mitochondria.
3. Symbiogenesis and evolution together have led to rapid changes in organisms, such as the acquisition of plastids over a few generations through endosymbiosis, rather than over many generations as suggested by many evolutionists. This conception of rapid evolution followed by long periods of stasis, first supported in this work, was the precursor to the idea of punctuated equilibrium.
4. There is a greater force for an evolutionary drive when two species engaged in a symbiotic relationship are very distinct.

It was not the drive toward the division of labor that led to the formation of these organoids, but the fact that certain partners joined the system that made a specific scheme of labor division possible.

— Boris Kozo-Polyansky, The New Principle of Biology- An Essay on the Theory of Symbiogenesis.

Kozo-Polyansky ultimately posited that symbiogenesis was a source of evolutionary novelty and that Darwinian mechanisms, such as natural selection, were responsible for maintaining the heritable changes brought about by symbiotic interactions.

== Legacy and impact ==
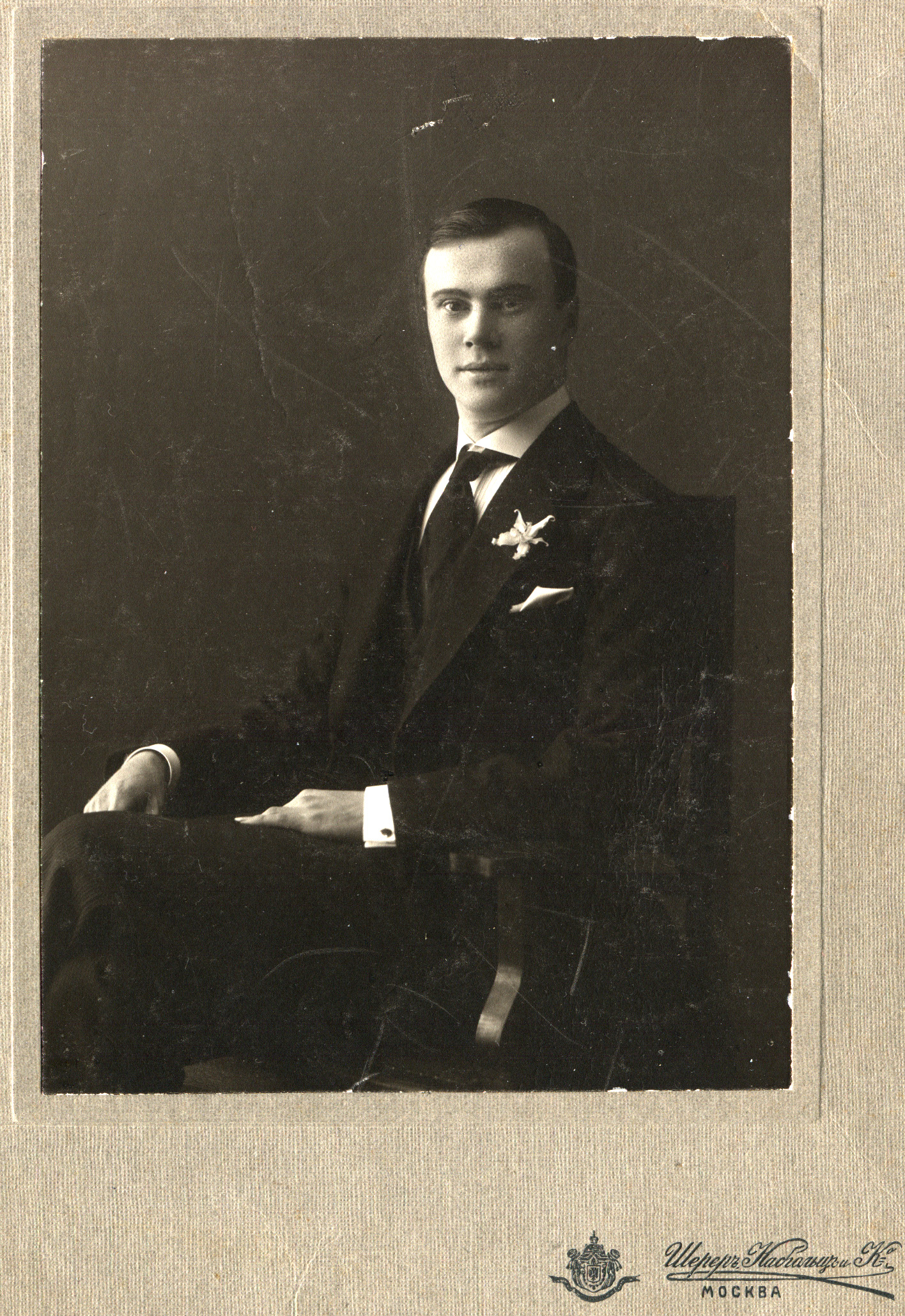
Boris Kozo-Polyansky (1915)

At the time of the publication of Kozo-Polyansky's theory and work on evolution and symbiogenesis, was ridiculed and rejected, and was never recognized for its merit during his lifetime. And due to the language barrier of Russian, was never read in the West, where English and German evolutionary works dominated the academic landscape. However, the works of other symbiogeneticists and Kozo-Polyansky were brought back into academic consciousness in 1967 by the work of Lynn Margulis who independently proposed a near identical theory to Kozo-Polyansky's. With the revival of evolutionary symbiogenesis, Margulis was made aware of Kozo-Polyansky's work by a former student of his, Armen Takhtajan at the 1975 International Conference of Botany. Kozo-Polyansky's theories were first published to the West in 1979 by Khakhina's book on the history of the theory of symbiogenesis. However, the entirety of his original book was not translated into English until 2010 by Victor Fet, and Lynn Margulis.

Today, his views are held to be correct by nearly the entire biological sciences community, and is regarded as one of the first thinkers to detail the endosymbiotic evolution of eukaryotic cells, the theory of punctuated equilibrium and the distinction between prokaryotic and eukaryotic life forms. A special issue of the journal BioSystems (2021) "Symbiogenesis and Progressive Evolution" is dedicated to Boris Kozo-Polyansky and Lynn Margulis.

== Works and honors ==
=== Published works ===
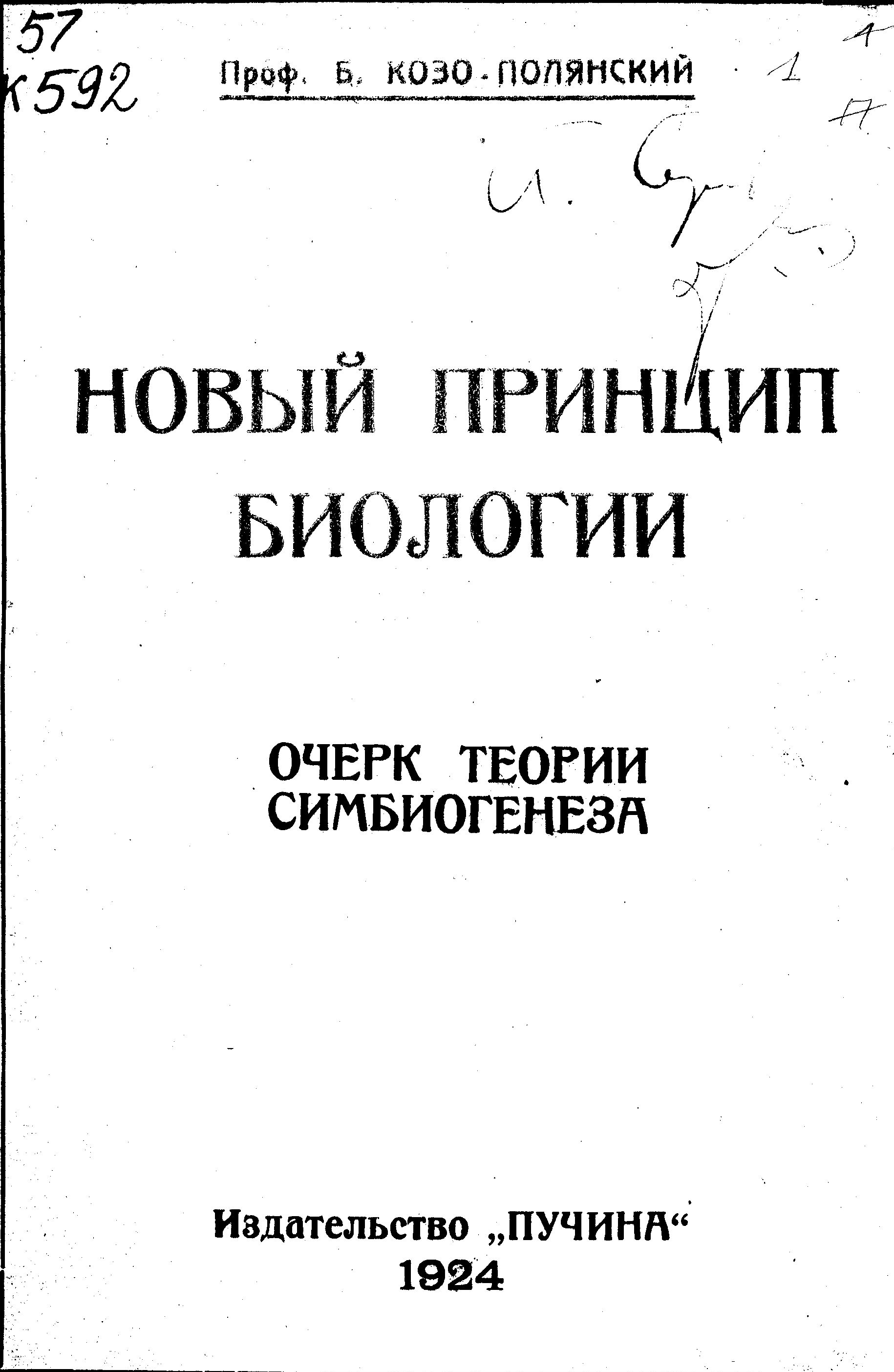
The original title page to the Russian edition of "Symbiogenesis: A New Principle of Biology" (1924)

Introduction to the phylogenetic systematics of higher plants, Voronezh, 1922

New principle of biology. Essay on the Theory of Symbiogenesis, Moscow, 1924

The main biogenetic law from the botanical point of view, Voronezh, 1937

Tea plants of Kazakhstan / Kazakh branch of the USSR Academy of Sciences; Otv. Ed. I. A. Polyakov. – Alma-Ata, 1943. – 26 p.

Course in the Systematics of Higher Plants, Voronezh, 1965

=== Honors ===
- Order of Lenin (2 awards)
- Order of the Red Banner of Labour
- Medal "For Valiant Labour in the Great Patriotic War 1941–1945"
- Corresponding Member of the Academy of Sciences of the Soviet Union (1932)
