= Andreas Franz Wilhelm Schimper =

German botanist and phytogeographer (1856–1901)

Andreas Schimper
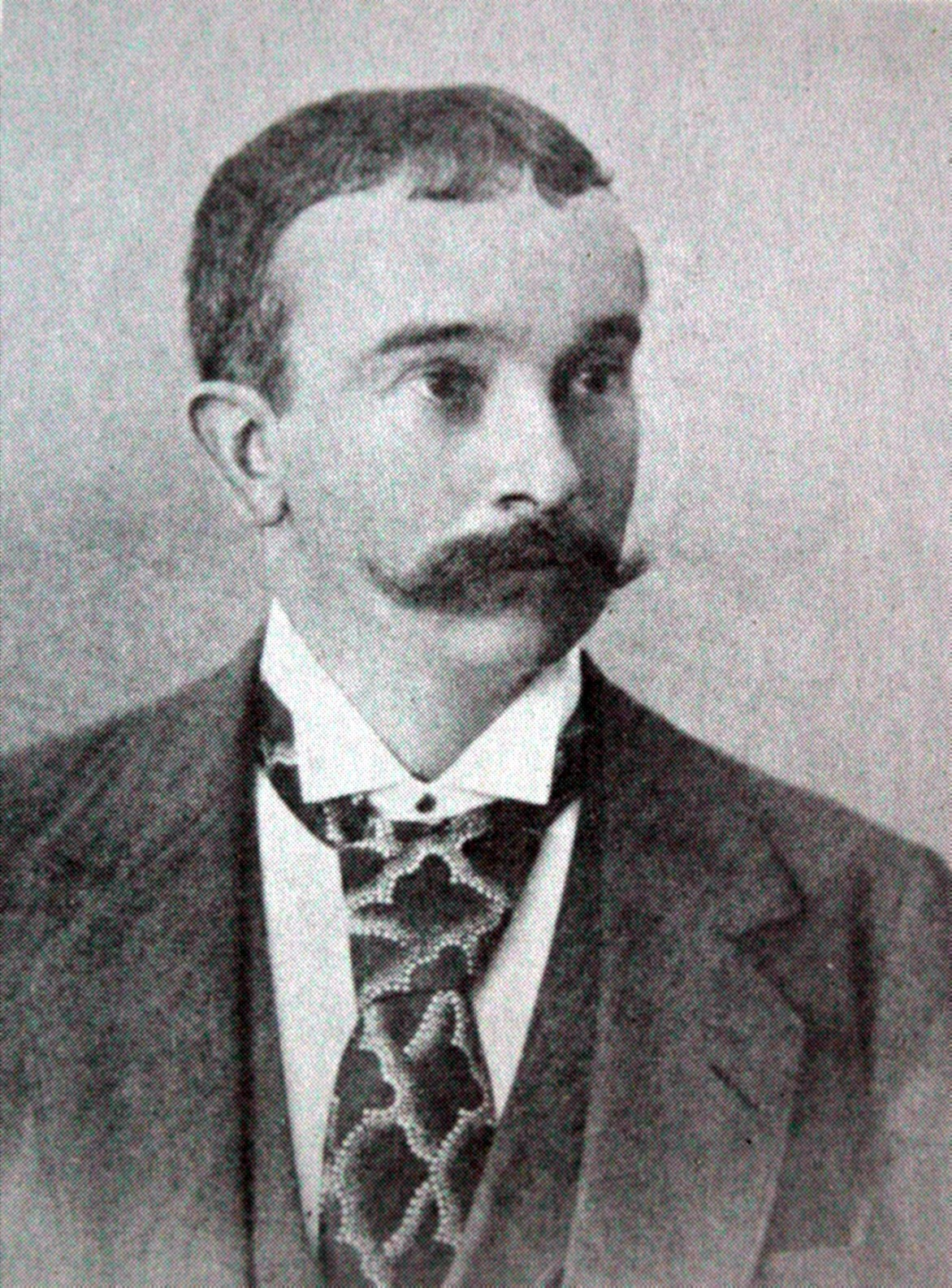
- c. 1890
- Born: 12 May 1856; Strasbourg, France
- Died: 9 September 1901 (aged 45); Basel
- Education: University of Strassburg
- Scientific career
- Fields: Botanist
- Author abbrev. (botany): A.Schimp.

Andreas Franz Wilhelm Schimper (12 May 1856 – 9 September 1901) was a German botanist and phytogeographer who made major contributions in the fields of histology, ecology and plant geography. He travelled to South East Asia and the Caribbean as part of the 1899 deep-sea expedition. He coined the terms tropical rainforest and sclerophyll and is commemorated in numerous specific names.

== Biography ==
Schimper was born in Strassburg (present day Strasbourg, France), into a family of eminent scientists. His father Wilhelm Philippe Schimper (1808–1880) was Director of the Natural History Museum in the same town, Professor of Geology, and a leading bryologist. His father's cousin was Georg Wilhelm Schimper (1804–1878), prominent collector and explorer in Arabia and North Africa; the naturalist Karl Friedrich Schimper was also a relative.

Schimper studied at the University of Strassburg from 1874 to 1878, acquiring a Ph.D. He then worked in Lyon, and in 1880 travelled to the United States, becoming a Fellow at Johns Hopkins University.

In 1882, he moved back to the University of Bonn working with Eduard Strasburger, becoming a private docent. In 1883, Schimper postulated the endosymbiotic origin of chloroplasts and paved the way to the symbiogenesis theory of Konstantin Mereschkowski and Lynn Margulis. In 1886, he was appointed Extraordinary Professor at the University of Bonn, and worked largely on cell histology, chromatophores and starch metabolism. He had become interested in phytogeography and plant ecology, undertaking expeditions to the West Indies and Venezuela in 1882–1883. In 1886, he stayed with Fritz Müller in Brazil, and in 1889–1890 in Ceylon, the Malaya and Botanical Garden in Buitenzorg (Bogor, Java), concentrating on mangroves, epiphytes and littoral vegetation. This resulted in his account of the Rhizophoraceae in Engler & Prantl's Natürliche Pflanzenfamilien.

In 1898, he became Professor of Botany at the University of Basel and the same year joined the German Valdivia-Expedition. This was a deep-sea expedition aboard the SS Valdivia led by Professor Carl Chun. The trip lasted 9 months, during which they visited the Canary Islands, Cameroon, Cape Town, (where he joined Rudolf Marloth on collecting trips in the southern Cape), Kerguelen, New Amsterdam and Cocos Islands, Sumatra, the Maldives, Ceylon, the Seychelles and the Red Sea.

Schimper was the first to give a clear and proper definition of plastid and also explained its types. In 1899, he became Professor of Botany at the University of Basel. His health had been seriously affected by malaria contracted in Cameroon and Dar-es-Salaam, and he died of complications of malaria at the age of 45 in 1901.

== Publications ==
Schimper is best known for Pflanzengeographie auf physiologischer Grundlage, published at the University of Jena in 1898 where he aimed to explain the expansion and ecology of plants based on the ecological knowledge of the time. In this book he coined the terms tropical rainforest and sclerophyll. He wrote in the preface: "Nur wenn sie in engster Fühlung mit der experimentellen Physiologie verbleibt, wird die Ökologie der Pflanzengeographie neue Bahnen eröffnen können, denn sie setzt eine genaue Kenntnis der Lebensbedingungen der Pflanze voraus, welche nur das Experiment verschaffen kann"(1898: IV). His classification of plant formations was important for the development of the botanical sciences: "Nach dem Vorhergehenden sind zwei ökologische Formationsgruppen zu unterscheiden, die klimatischen oder Gebietsformationen, deren Vegetationscharakter durch die Hydrometeore beherrscht, und die edaphischen oder Standortsformationen, wo derselbe in erster Linie durch die Bodenbeschaffenheit bedingt ist" (1898:175–176).

At the same time as his Russian soil science colleagues, Schimper discussed the hypothesis of vegetation being limited to climate zones versus those that are azonal, which was later elaborated by Frederic Edward Clements (1916) and geobotanist Heinrich Walter (1954) amongst others.

In 1894, Schimper was one of the four original authors of the textbook of botany Lehrbuch der Botanik (named. "Strasburger") and until the 5th edition of 1902 editor of the chapter on spermatophyta or seed-bearing plants.

Rudolf Marloth wrote an account of the Cape floral region for Chun's proposed Wissenschaftliche Ergebnisse der deutschen Tiefsee-Expedition auf dem Dampfer Valdivia 1898–1899. and Schimper contributed two chapters on "Gebiet der Hartlaubgehölze" (Region of hardwood trees) and "Der Knysnawald".

== Honours and distinctions ==
Schimper is commemorated in specific names such as Acokanthera schimperi and Harpachne schimperi. In 1892, he was voted a member of the Deutsche Akademie der Naturforscher Leopoldina.
