= Gary B. Fogel =

American biologist and computer scientist

Gary Bryce Fogel
- Born: 1968 (age 57–58)
- Education: University of California, Santa Cruz (B.A. in Biology, minor in Earth Sciences), University of California, Los Angeles (Ph.D. in Biology)
- Known for: Computational intelligence, machine learning in bioinformatics and computational biology
- Notable work: Applications in viral evolution, drug discovery, cancer research, RNA structure
- Awards: Fellow, Institute of Electrical and Electronics Engineers (2012); Fellow, Asia-Pacific Artificial Intelligence Association (2022); Outstanding Contribution to Aerospace Education Award, AIAA San Diego Section (2019, 2023); Meritorious Service Award, IEEE Computational Intelligence Society (2016)
- Scientific career
- Fields: Biology, computer science, artificial intelligence
- Institutions: Natural Selection, Inc., San Diego State University

Gary Bryce Fogel (born 1968) is an American biologist and computer scientist. He is the Chief Executive Officer of Natural Selection, Inc. He is most known for his applications of computational intelligence and machine learning to bioinformatics, computational biology, and industrial optimization.

== Education and Research ==
Fogel was born and raised in La Jolla, California, graduating from La Jolla High School. He received a B.A. in biology with a minor in earth sciences from the University of California, Santa Cruz in 1991 and a Ph.D. in biology from the University of California, Los Angeles in 1998. Fogel has published over 150 peer-reviewed publications in conferences and journals, 2 edited books, and 11 patents. As CEO of Natural Selection, Inc., his research focuses on the application of computational intelligence, machine learning, and predictive analytics in areas not limited to: Viral evolution, cellular differentiation, drug discovery, RNA structure, cis-regulatory elements, cancer, and evolutionary game theory as well as the development of evolutionary algorithms and other approaches.

== Service ==
Between 2008–2018 Gary Fogel was editor-in-chief of the Elsevier journal BioSystems. He has served previously as an associate editor for IEEE Transactions on Artificial Intelligence, IEEE Computational Intelligence Magazine (2005–2010), IEEE Transactions on Evolutionary Computation (2001–2013), IEEE Transactions on Emerging Topics in Computational Intelligence (2016–2018), IEEE/ACM Transactions on Computational Biology and Bioinformatics (2004–2008), International Journal of Bioinformatics Research and Applications (2004–2007), International Journal of Data Mining and Bioinformatics (2005–2007), as a consulting editor for the Journal of Computational Intelligence in Bioinformatics (2006–2007), and as an editorial board member of Ecological Informatics (2005–2009) and BMC Big Data Analytics (2015–2020).

Within the IEEE Computational Intelligence Society, Fogel founded the Bioinformatics and Bioengineering Technical Committee and established the IEEE Computational Intelligence in Bioinformatics and Computational Biology conference series, chairing the first two meetings in 2004 and 2005 in San Diego. He co-founded the IEEE Conference on Artificial Intelligence in 2023. Fogel served on the IEEE Computational Intelligence Society Administrative Committee (2004–2009, 2014–2022) and served as IEEE CIS Vice President of Conferences (2010–2013, 2019).

== Teaching ==
Gary Fogel also serves as adjunct faculty at San Diego State University in the department of aerospace engineering as well as in the Computational Science Research Center. He has authored four books and numerous articles on the history of early aviation focusing on motorless flight. He is an associate fellow of the American Institute of Aeronautics and Astronautics and serves on the AIAA History Committee.

== Awards ==
- 2023 – Outstanding Contribution to Aerospace Education Award, AIAA San Diego Section
- 2022 – Elected Fellow of the Asia-Pacific Artificial Intelligence Association
- 2019 – Top 100 AI Leaders in Drug Discovery and Advanced Healthcare by Deep Knowledge Analytics
- 2019 – Outstanding Contribution to Aerospace Education Award, AIAA San Diego Section
- 2016 – Meritorious Service Award, IEEE Computational Intelligence Society
- 2016 – Outstanding Contribution to the Community Award, AIAA San Diego Section
- 2015 – Outstanding Enhancement of the Image of the Aerospace Profession Award, AIAA San Diego Section
- 2012 – Medal for Significant Achievement, San Diego Chapter of Sigma Xi
- 2012 – Fellow of the Institute of Electrical and Electronics Engineers for contributions to computational intelligence and its application to biology, chemistry, and medicine.

== Aeromodeling ==
Gary Fogel has established national and world records for model aircraft. He helped establish the National Model Aviation Heritage program for the Academy of Model Aeronautics. He is a leader member, contest director, and fellow of the Academy of Model Aeronautics, and was inducted into the Academy of Model Aeronautics Hall of Fame in 2025.
