= Wilhelm Philippe Schimper =

Alsatian botanist (1808–1880)

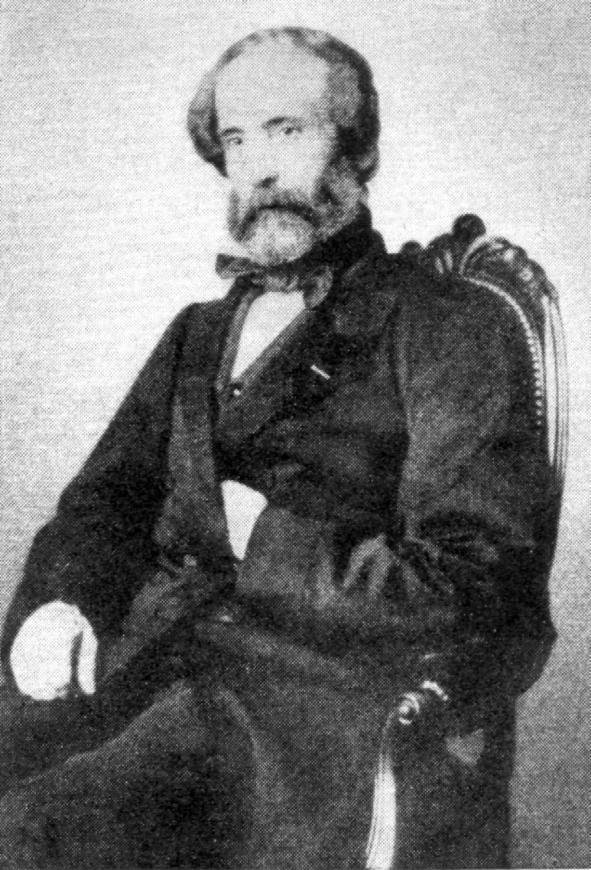
Wilhelm Philippe Schimper

Wilhelm Philippe Schimper (January 12, 1808 – March 20, 1880, in Lichtenberg) was an Alsatian botanist with French, later German citizenship. (Note: Schimper acquired German citizenship in 1871.) He was born in Dossenheim-sur-Zinsel, but spent his youth in Offwiller, a village at the foot of the Vosges mountain range in Alsace. He was the father of botanist Andreas Franz Wilhelm Schimper (1856–1901), and a cousin to naturalist Karl Friedrich Schimper (1803–1867) and botanist Georg Heinrich Wilhelm Schimper (1804–1878).

== Life ==
Following graduation from the University of Strasbourg, he worked as a curator at the Natural History Museum in Strasbourg, becoming director of the museum in 1839. The museum has a bust of Schimper at the top of the stairs.

From 1862 until 1879, he was a professor of geology and natural history at the University of Strasbourg.

Schimper's contributions to biology were primarily in the specialized fields of bryology (study of mosses) and paleobotany (study of plant fossils). He spent considerable time collecting botanical specimens in his travels throughout Europe. Together with Jean-Baptiste Mougeot, Antoine Mougeot and Chrétien Géofroy Nestler he edited three exsiccatae, among them Stirpes cryptogamae Vogeso-Rhenanae; quas in Rheni superioris inferiorisque, nec non Vogesorum praefecturis collegerunt (1843-1854). Among his writings was the six-volume Bryologia Europaea, an epic work that was published between 1836 and 1855. It was co-written with Philipp Bruch (1781–1847), and it described every species of European moss known at the time.

Schimper also made significant contributions in geology. In 1874, he proposed a new scientific subdivision of geological time. He called the new epoch the "Paleocene Era", of which he based on paleobotanical findings from the Paris Basin.

== Honours ==
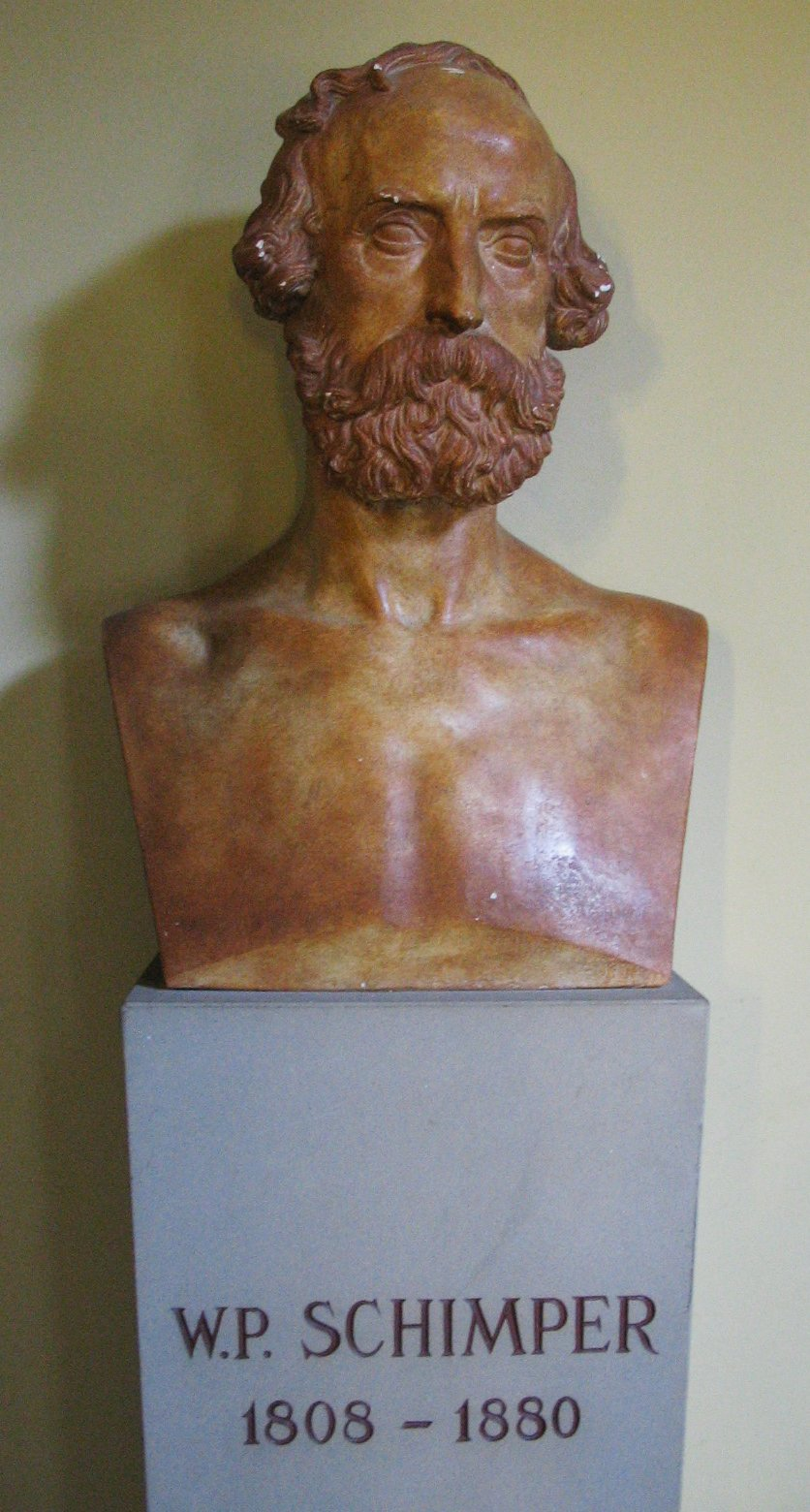
W. P. Schimper

Since 1854, he had been a Corresponding Member of the French Academy of Sciences in Paris. Schimper was elected as a member of the German National Academy of Sciences Leopoldina in 1862. He was elected as a member to the American Philosophical Society in 1866. He became a Corresponding Member of the Göttingen Academy of Sciences and Humanities in 1872.

A street bears his name in the Orangerie quarter of Strasbourg.

== Writings ==
- "Bryologia europaea" (Stuttgart, 1836–55, six volumes).
- Monographie des plantes du fossiles grès bigarré de la chaine des Vosges, 1841 – Monograph on fossil plants from the variegated sandstone of the Vosges Mountains.
- Recherches sur les mousses anatomiques et morphologiques, 1850 – Research on the anatomy and morphology of mosses.
- Mémoire pour servir à l'histoire naturelle des Sphagnum, 1854 – Treatise on the natural history of sphagnum.
- "Synopsis muscorum europaeorum" (1860, second edition in 1876).
- Le terrain de transition des Vosges, 1862 – The changing terrain of Vosges.
- Traité de Paléontologie végétale (1869 to 1874 in two volumes) – Treatise on paleobotany.
