= Schimpera =

Scientific classification
- Kingdom: Plantae
- Clade: Tracheophytes
- Clade: Angiosperms
- Clade: Eudicots
- Clade: Rosids
- Order: Brassicales
- Family: Brassicaceae
- Genus: Schimpera; Steud. & Hochst. ex Endl.
- Species: S. arabica

Binomial name
- Schimpera arabica Hochst. & Steud.

Synonyms
- Schimpera arabica subsp. persica (Boiss.) Hadac & Chrtek; Schimpera persica Boiss.

Species of flowering plant

Schimpera is a monotypic genus of flowering plants belonging to the family Brassicaceae. The only species is Schimpera arabica.

Its native range is eastern Mediterranean to Iran and Arabian Peninsula. It is found in Egypt, the Gulf States, Iraq, Kuwait, Lebanon, Palestine, Saudi Arabia, Syria and the Sinai desert.

The genus name of Schimpera is in honour of Georg Wilhelm Schimper (1804–1878), a German botanist and naturalist. The genus has the synonym of Traillia Lindl. ex Endl. The Latin specific epithet of arabica means coming from the land of the Arabs. It was first described and published in Gen. Pl. on page 889 in 1839. The species was first published in E.G.von Steudel, Nomencl. Bot., ed.2, Vol.2 on page 530 in 1841.
