= Oreoschimperella =

Scientific classification
- Kingdom: Plantae
- Clade: Embryophytes
- Clade: Tracheophytes
- Clade: Angiosperms
- Clade: Eudicots
- Clade: Asterids
- Order: Apiales
- Family: Apiaceae
- Tribe: Pyramidoptereae
- Genus: Oreoschimperella; Rauschert

Species
- See text

Synonyms
- Schimperella H.Wolff

Genus of flowering plants

Oreoschimperella is a genus of flowering plants in the umbellifer family Apiaceae, native to Kenya, Ethiopia, and the Arabian Peninsula. Poorly studied, they are closely related to Trachyspermum.

The genus name of Oreoschimperella is in honour of Georg Wilhelm Schimper (1804–1878), a German botanist and naturalist.

== Species ==
Currently accepted species include:

- Oreoschimperella aberdarensis (C.Norman) Rauschert
- Oreoschimperella arabiae-felicis (C.C.Towns.) C.C.Towns.
- Oreoschimperella verrucosa (J.Gay ex A.Rich.) Rauschert
