= Paul Portier (physiologist) =

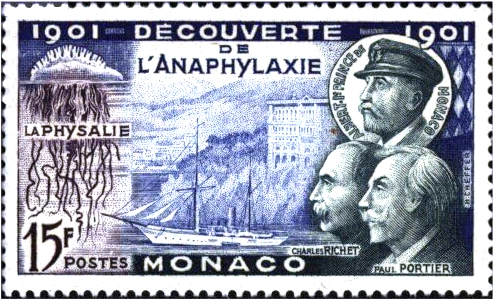
- 1953 stamp of Monaco commemorating the discovery of anaphylaxis by Charles Richet and Paul Portier
- Born: 22 May 1866; Bar-sur-Seine, France
- Died: 26 January 1962 (aged 95); Bourg-la-Reine
- Education: University of Paris
- Known for: Discovery of anaphylaxis Symbiogenesis
- Scientific career
- Fields: Physiology
- Workplaces: University of Paris; Institut océanographique de Paris

Paul Jules Portier (French pronunciation: [pɔl ʒyl pɔʁtje]; 22 May 1866 – 26 January 1962) was a French physiologist who made important contributions to the discovery of anaphylaxis and the development of symbiogenesis. On a scientific expedition organised by Albert I, Prince of Monaco, he and Charles Richet discovered that toxins produced by marine animals (cnidarians such as Portuguese man o' war and sea anemone) could induce fatal shocks. They named the medical phenomenon "anaphylaxis," from which Richet went on to receive the 1913 Nobel Prize in Physiology or Medicine. Portier was the first scientist to explain that the cell organelle, mitochondrion, arose by symbiosis according to his evolutionary theory in 1918.

== Biography ==
Portier was born in Bar-sur-Seine, France, to Ernest Paul and Julie Moreau Laure. He studied elementary education at the Lycée de Troyes from 1878 to 1885. After passing the final secondary examination (called bac) from the Saint-Sigisbert in Nancy, he qualified for service in the Ministry of Finance in 1888. However, he chose to study biology, following his childhood dream. In 1889, he entered the University of Paris from where he earned an M.D. in 1897 and Doctor of Science (docteur ès sciences) degree in 1912. He continued to work in the university as an assistant physician.

In 1906, Albert I, Prince of Monaco founded the Institute of Oceanography (Institut océanographique de Paris); Portier was appointed its professor. When the institute was inaugurated in 1911, Portier became its first director. In 1920, he was appointed professor of professor of comparative physiology at the University of Paris. In 1923, the University of Paris created a chair of physiology, which he held for the rest of his career. He retired in 1936, and the university awarded him the position of honorary professor. He played active roles in the administrations of the French Academy of Sciences and the French Academy of Medicine. He published his last book The Biology of Butterflies in 1949.

Portier married Françoise Noiret Claudine in 1911, and had three daughters, Andrée, Jeannine and Paulette. He spent his last days at his home in Bourg-la-Reine.

== Contributions ==
=== Anaphylaxis ===
In 1901, Albert I, Prince of Monaco organised a scientific expedition around the French coast of the Atlantic Ocean. He specifically invited Portier and Charles Richet, professor of physiology at the Collège de France, to join him for investigating the toxins produced by cnidarians (like jellyfish and sea anemones). Richet and Portier boarded Albert's ship Princesse Alice II from where they collected various marine animals.

Richet and Portier extracted a toxin called hypnotoxin from their collection of jellyfish (but the real source was later identified as Portuguese man o' war) and sea anemone (Actinia sulcata) from Cape Verde Islands. In their first experiment on the ship, they injected a dog with the toxin in an attempt to immunise the dog, which instead developed a severe reaction (hypersensitivity). To confirm the findings, they knew that more experimental works were needed in the laboratory. In 1902, they repeated the injections in their laboratory and found that dogs normally tolerated the toxin at first injection, but on re-exposure, three weeks later with the same dose, they always developed fatal shock. They also found that the effect was not related to the doses of toxin used, as even small amounts in secondary injections were lethal. Thus, instead of inducing tolerance (prophylaxis) which they expected, they discovered effects of the toxin as deadly.

In 1902, Richet introduced the term aphylaxis to describe the condition of lack of protection. He later changed the term to anaphylaxis on grounds of euphony. The term is from the Greek ἀνά-, ana-, meaning "against", and φύλαξις, phylaxis, meaning "protection". On 15 February 1902, Richet and Portier jointly presented their findings before the Société de biologie in Paris. The moment is regarded as the birth of allergy (the term invented by Clemens von Pirquet in 1906) study (allergology). Richet continued to study on the phenomenon and was eventually awarded the Nobel Prize in Physiology or Medicine for his work on anaphylaxis in 1913.

Portier never claimed the co-discovery of anaphylaxis, instead honoured Richet as a senior scientist. After the Nobel Prize, Richet praised him for "giving up all claim to the honor of the discovery." Portier explained: "We discovered anaphylaxis without looking for it, and almost in spite of ourselves. But it was necessary to have the eyes and mind of a physiologist to understand the interest."

=== Marine biology ===
Portier was the first to realise that condensation of water vapour was the cause of the spout of a blowing whale and other marine mammals. He showed that condensation occurred in the expelled air as water vapour was spread and cooled down. His studies from 1909 established the principle of surface tension in insects that walked on water. His studies in 1922 involved osmoregulation (salt-water balance) in fishes. In 1934, he showed that deaths of marine birds in oil spills were due to loss of body heat caused by oils infiltrating the feathers.

=== Symbiosis and symbiogenesis ===
Following his interest in entomology and physiology, Portier studied how insects such as termites digest cellulose. He found out that bacteria in termite's gut were essential for cellulose digestion. In addition, the bacteria provided essential vitamins to the termites and were involved during the developmental processes of the hosts. Thus, the bacteria were symbionts. It was at the time a known fact that such bacteria were parasites. Portier began to realised that microbes could be necessary for the lives and formation of higher organisms. In 1917, he published the role of symbiosis in the lives of plants and animals, and by that time he started writing a book, he called Les Symbiotes. He was able to link the similarities of bacteria and mitochondria, the energy-producing cell organelles, and claimed that mitochondria behaved just like bacteria in culture.

In 1918, Portier, summing up his observations on symbiosis in nature and his evolutionary idea (now known as symbiogenesis), published Les Symbiotes, dedicating it to Prince Albert. According to Portier, symbiosis is a universal process by which all complex life forms (eukaryotes) arose from the fusion of independent unicellular organisms; mitochondria, for examples, are just a type of bacteria. He made a statement:

All living beings, all animals from Amoeba to Man, all plants from Cryptogams to Dicotyledons are constituted by an association, the emboîtement [embodiment] of two different beings. Each living cell contains in its protoplasm formations, which histologists designate by the name of mitochondria. These organelles are, for me, nothing other than symbiotic bacteria, which I call "symbiotes."

As Portier himself remarked that his theory was "a veritable scientific heresy," the book and the evolutionary idea were received with scepticism and ridicule. The Société de biologie created a committee to investigate the controversy. Scientists at the Pasteur Institute openly argued that mitochondria could never be cultured and challenged Portier to demonstrate his experiments. As John Archibald described: "Les Symbiotes caused a brouhaha in France... Portier's reputation as a competent experimentalist was damaged and his grand hypothesis was ignored." The next year, Auguste Lumière published a refutation Le Mythe des Symbiotes ("The Myth of Symbiotes"). Portier had prepared a draft of the sequel to Les Symbiotes, but never published it or touched on the subject of evolution again. (Symbiogenesis is now widely accepted, and mitochondria are evidently once free-living bacteria.)

== Honours ==
Portier received the Montyon Prize in 1912, La Caze in 1934, and Jean Toy in 1951 from the French Academy of Sciences. He was given Chevalier (Knight) in 1923, Officier (Officer) in 1935, and Commandeur (Commander) in 1951 of the Legion of Honour. He was honoured Commander of the Order of Saint Charles (1951) and of the Order of Cultural Merit (1954) of Monaco. He was elected member of the French Academy of Medicine in 1929 and of the French Academy of Sciences in 1936.
