= Journal of Plant Physiology =

- Discipline: Plant physiology
- Language: English
- Edited by: Herbert J. Kronzucker, Quan-Sheng Qiu, Uwe Sonnewald

Publication details
- Former names: Zeitschrift für Botanik, Zeitschrift für Pflanzenphysiologie
- History: 1909–present
- Publisher: Elsevier
- Open access: Hybrid
- License: CC BY or CC BY-NC-ND
- Impact factor: 4.3 (2022)

Standard abbreviations
- ISO 4: J. Plant Physiol.

Indexing
- CODEN: JPPHEY
- ISSN: 0176-1617
- LCCN: 84647609
- OCLC no.: 888481721

Links
- Journal homepage; Online archive

The Journal of Plant Physiology is a peer-reviewed scientific journal covering all areas of plant physiology. It was established in 1909 as Zeitschrift für Botanik and renamed Zeitschrift für Pflanzenphysiologie in 1965, before obtaining its present name in 1984. It is published by Elsevier. The editors-in-chief are Herbert J. Kronzucker (University of Melbourne), Quan-Sheng Qiu (Lanzhou University), and Uwe Sonnewald (University of Erlangen–Nuremberg). According to the Journal Citation Reports, the journal has a 2022 impact factor of 4.3.
