= Ivan Wallin =

American biologist (1883–1969)

- Born: 22 January 1883; Stanton, Iowa, US
- Died: 6 March 1969 (aged 86); Phoenix, Arizona
- Education: University of Nebraska (MSc); New York University (DSc)
- Known for: Endosymbiotic theory
- Spouse: Eva Louise Shepard
- Scientific career
- Fields: Anatomy; Cell biology
- Workplaces: University of Colorado School of Medicine

Ivan Emanuel Wallin (22 January 1883 – 6 March 1969) was an American biologist who made the first experimental works on endosymbiotic theory. Nicknamed the "Mitochondria Man", he claimed that mitochondria, which are cell organelles, were once independent bacteria, as supported by his comparative studies and culture of isolated mitochondria. From 1922, he published a series of papers titled "On the nature of mitochondria" in the American Journal of Anatomy which became the experimental foundations of his claims. He was the first person to specifically postulate that eukaryotic organelles originated from bacteria, and that symbiosis is a major force in creation of new species.

Wallin was Professor of Anatomy at the University of Colorado School of Medicine. He was noted for his eccentric life in academia, such as his preference for exclusively practical demonstration rather than lecturing, his frequent parties for students and an annual Christmas glögg party.

== Biography ==
Wallin was born to Swedish immigrant parents, Claus Henrik Wallin and Emma Augusta Maria (Johansdotter), in a small farming community at Stanton, Iowa. He was educated at Augustana College at Illinois and Princeton University. He obtained a BS degree from the University of Iowa in 1905. He briefly taught biology at the University of Nebraska from where he earned his MSc in 1908. In 1915 he obtained his doctorate degree (DSc) in anatomy from the New York University. His thesis was on the tissue development, differentiation, and morphology of the lamprey Ammocoete. From 1918, he was professor of anatomy at the University of Colorado School of Medicine.

== Origin of mitochondria ==
Wallin was the first to experimentally investigate the origin of mitochondria, particularly in relation to their similarities with certain bacteria. His first paper in 1922 described the staining techniques for bacterial cells, and found that the techniques were equally good for staining mitochondria. He concluded that "bacteria and mitochondria have a similar chemical constitution". His subsequent paper (in the same year and same journal) further strengthened his assumptions. In addition, he observed in his study of blue green algae that chloroplasts are "bacteria or bacteria-like organisms that accepted the leisure of a symbiotic partnership in the struggle for existence". He made a summary conclusion that:

From the evidence that has been recorded in these studies, together with the evidence that may be found in mitochondrial literature, the author can arrive at no other conclusion than, that mitochondria are symbiotic bacteria in the cytoplasm of the cells of all higher organisms whose symbiotic existence had its inception at the dawn of phylogenetic evolution. The conception embodied in this conclusion presupposes that the establishment of new symbiotic complexes is coexistent with the development of new species.

Wallin was aware that he needed to culture mitochondria isolated from cell in an independent environment. His early experiment was a failure using tissue samples from guinea pig, dog, and human blood. However, he succeeded in obtaining a mitochondrial culture with liver of fetal and newborn rabbits. He reported his findings in 1924 with a remark that "mitochondria are, in reality, bacterial organisms, symbiotically combined with the tissues of higher organisms." He continued with prolific publications. The series of his papers titled "On the nature of mitochondria" reached nine in 1925. He gave a full description of his experiments and theories on mitochondria in his 1927 book Symbionticism and the Origin of Species. Although he claimed that his experiments were performed with utmost care, critics rejected them on the grounds of possible contamination, and Wallin and his works were largely forgotten, until Lynn Margulis introduced a more complete endosymbiotic theory with better evidences in 1967.

== Personal life ==
Wallin married Eva Louise Shepard.

Wallin was known for his eccentric behaviour in his professional life. He avoided lecturing, but instead used practical demonstrations. He frequently organised parties for his students, who in return helped him build a cabin in North St. Vrain Canyon, 20 miles north of Boulder. The parties were simply named "Club Wallin" which involved heavy drinking beside playing games. His notable habit was holding an annual Christmas glögg party. At the party guests were treated with Swedish delicacies such as sillsallad (pickled herring salad), lutefisk (dried codfish), and mulled wine.

== Book ==
- Wallin, Ivan E (1927). Symbionticism and the origin of species. Baltimore: Williams & Wilkins Company. ISBN 9785872146940.
