= Hans Ris =

- Born: June 15, 1914; Bern, Switzerland
- Died: November 19, 2004 (aged 90); Madison, Wisconsin, USA
- Education: Columbia University
- Awards: E.B. Wilson Medal (1993)
- Scientific career
- Fields: Zoology
- Workplaces: University of Wisconsin-Madison

Hans Ris (June 15, 1914 – November 19, 2004) was an American cytologist and pioneer electron microscopist. His studies of chromosome structure revealed the importance of non-histone proteins, and along with evolutionary biologist Lynn Margulis, he was one of the first to recognize that blue-green algae were a special type of bacteria. He coined the term genophore for prokaryote DNA to highlight its differences from the eukaryal chromosome. Ris was a founding member of the American Society for Cell Biology and received the Distinguished Scientist Award by the Microscopy Society of America in 1983.

== Biography ==
Hans Ris was born in Bern, Switzerland on 15 June 1914, where he also grew up. Inspired by the works of the French entomologist Jean Henri Fabre, he observed the habits of ants, wasps and bees. He came to America in 1938 to work with B.H. Willier at Rochester, New York. After receiving his doctorate at Columbia University he moved to Johns Hopkins and later to the laboratory of Alfred Mirsky at Rockefeller University, where he studied the structure of chromosomes. He then went to the zoology department of the University of Wisconsin-Madison in 1949, where he started to work with electron microscopes. In 1972 he established the High Voltage Electron Microscopy (HVEM) laboratory within the University of Wisconsin-Madison. He retired at age 75, but remained Emeritus Investigator of the University of Wisconsin’s Integrated Microscopy Resource (IMR) and continued to work on high-resolution images of the nuclear pore complex.

== Hans Ris Seminar Series ==
The Laboratory of Optical and Computational Instrumentation (LOCI) in collaboration with the Center for Quantitative Cell Imaging at the University of Wisconsin-Madison hosts an annual seminar series honoring Ris, who oversaw the installation of one of the nation's first high-voltage electron microscopes in the former location of LOCI. Ris remained Emeritus Investigator of the IMR until his death in 2004.

Hans Ris Seminar Series Featured Speakers:

2022: Wolfgang Baumeister; Max Planck Institute of Biochemistry

2019: Davi Bock; University of Vermont and Janelia Farms

2018: Tatyana Svitkina; University of Pennsylvania

2017: Erik M. Jorgensen; University of Utah

2016: David H. Hall; Albert Einstein College

2015: Kent McDonald; UC Berkeley

2014: Wah Chiu; Baylor College of Medicine

2013: Thomas Müller-Reichert; Technische Universität Dresden

2012: Mark E. Ellisman; UC San Diego

== Selected works ==
- Mirsky, A. E., and Hans Ris. "Variable and constant components of chromosomes." Nature 163.4148 (1949): 666-666.
- Mirsky, A. E., and Hans Ris. "The desoxyribonucleic acid content of animal cells and its evolutionary significance." The Journal of general physiology 34.4 (1951): 451.
- Peterson, JOAN B., and Hans Ris. "Electron-microscopic study of the spindle and chromosome movement in the yeast Saccharomyces cerevisiae." Journal of cell science 22.2 (1976): 219-242.
