= Symbiogenesis =

Evolutionary theory

In the theory of symbiogenesis, a merger of an archaean and an aerobic bacterium some 2.2 Gya created the eukaryotes, with aerobic mitochondria; a second merger some 1.6 Gya added chloroplasts, creating the green plants. The original theory by Lynn Margulis proposed an additional preliminary merger, but this is poorly supported and not now generally believed.

Symbiogenesis, also known as the endosymbiotic theory or serial endosymbiotic theory, is the leading scientific theory for the evolutionary origin of eukaryotes from prokaryotic ancestors. The theory holds that multi-membraned eukaryotic organelles such as mitochondria and chloroplasts are endosymbionts descended from formerly free-living prokaryotes (more closely related to the Bacteria than to the Archaea) that were phagocytized into another prokaryote's endomembrane system. Mitochondria appear to be phylogenetically derived from Alphaproteobacteria such as Rickettsiales, while chloroplasts are thought to be derived from beta-cyanobacteria.

The idea that chloroplasts were originally independent unicellular organisms that merged into a symbiotic relationship with other unicellular organisms dates back to the 19th century, when it was espoused by researchers such as Andreas Schimper. The endosymbiotic theory was articulated in 1905 and 1910 by the Russian botanist Konstantin Mereschkowski, and advanced and substantiated with microbiological evidence by Lynn Margulis in 1967.

Among the many lines of evidence supporting symbiogenesis are that mitochondria and plastids contain their own chromosomes and reproduce by binary fission, parallel but separate from the sexual reproduction of the rest of the cell; that the chromosomes of some mitochondria and plastids are single circular DNA molecules similar to the circular chromosomes of bacteria; that the transport proteins called porins are found in the outer membranes of mitochondria and chloroplasts, and also bacterial cell membranes; and that cardiolipin is found only in the inner mitochondrial membrane and bacterial cell membranes. They also contain a separate layer of biomembrane in addition to the ones enveloping other organelles.

== History ==
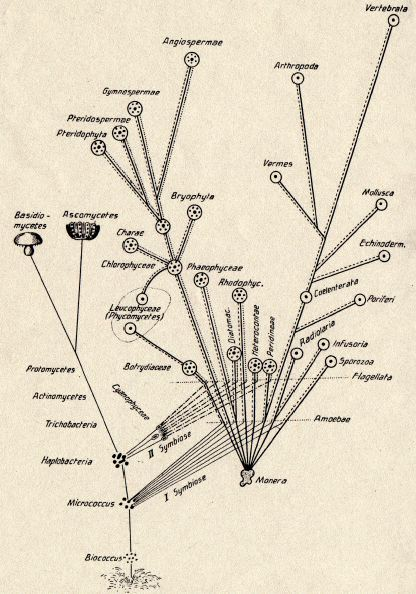
Konstantin Mereschkowski's 1905 tree-of-life diagram, showing the origin of complex life-forms by two episodes of symbiogenesis, the incorporation of symbiotic bacteria to form successively nuclei and chloroplasts

The Russian botanist Konstantin Mereschkowski first outlined the theory of symbiogenesis (from Greek: σύν syn "together", βίος bios "life", and γένεσις genesis "origin, birth") in his 1905 work, The nature and origins of chromatophores in the plant kingdom, and then elaborated it in his 1910 The Theory of Two Plasms as the Basis of Symbiogenesis, a New Study of the Origins of Organisms. Mereschkowski proposed that complex life-forms had originated by two episodes of symbiogenesis, the incorporation of symbiotic bacteria to form successively nuclei and chloroplasts. Mereschkowski knew of the work of botanist Andreas Schimper. In 1883, Schimper had observed that the division of chloroplasts in green plants closely resembled that of free-living cyanobacteria. Schimper had tentatively proposed (in a footnote) that green plants had arisen from a symbiotic union of two organisms. In 1918 the French scientist Paul Jules Portier published Les Symbiotes, in which he claimed that the mitochondria originated from a symbiosis process. Ivan Wallin advocated the idea of an endosymbiotic origin of mitochondria in the 1920s. The Russian botanist Boris Kozo-Polyansky became the first to explain the theory in terms of Darwinian evolution. In his 1924 book A New Principle of Biology. Essay on the Theory of Symbiogenesis, he wrote, "The theory of symbiogenesis is a theory of selection relying on the phenomenon of symbiosis."

These theories did not gain traction until more detailed electron-microscopic comparisons between cyanobacteria and chloroplasts were made, such as by Hans Ris in 1961 and 1962. These, combined with the discovery that plastids and mitochondria contain their own DNA, led to a resurrection of the idea of symbiogenesis in the 1960s. Lynn Margulis advanced and substantiated the theory with microbiological evidence in a 1967 paper, On the origin of mitosing cells. In her 1981 work Symbiosis in Cell Evolution she argued that eukaryotic cells originated as communities of interacting entities, including endosymbiotic spirochaetes that developed into eukaryotic flagella and cilia. This last idea has not received much acceptance, because flagella lack DNA and do not show ultrastructural similarities to bacteria or to archaea (see also: Evolution of flagella and Prokaryotic cytoskeleton). According to Margulis and Dorion Sagan, "Life did not take over the globe by combat, but by networking" (i.e., by cooperation). Christian de Duve proposed that the peroxisomes may have been the first endosymbionts, allowing cells to withstand growing amounts of free molecular oxygen in the Earth's atmosphere. However, it now appears that peroxisomes may be formed de novo, contradicting the idea that they have a symbiotic origin. The fundamental theory of symbiogenesis as the origin of mitochondria and chloroplasts is now widely accepted.

Symbiogenesis revolutionised the history of evolution by proposing a mechanism not encompassed in the original Darwininan vision. It suggested that major developments, particularly the origin of eukaryotic cells, resulted from symbiotic mergers rather than from the mutations and competition of classical natural selection.

== From endosymbionts to organelles ==
Biologists usually distinguish organelles from endosymbionts – whole organisms living inside other organisms – by their reduced genome sizes. As an endosymbiont evolves into an organelle, most of its genes are transferred to the host cell genome. The host cell and organelle therefore need to develop a transport mechanism that enables the return of the protein products needed by the organelle but now manufactured by the cell.

=== Free-living ancestors ===
Alphaproteobacteria are thought to be the free-living organisms most closely related to mitochondria. More recent research has indicated further that mitochondria are most closely related to the subclade of Alphaproteobacteria known as Pelagibacterales bacteria, in particular, those in the SAR11 clade.

Nitrogen-fixing filamentous cyanobacteria are the free-living organisms most closely related to plastids.

Both cyanobacteria and alphaproteobacteria maintain a large (>6 Mb) genome encoding thousands of proteins. Plastids and mitochondria exhibit a dramatic reduction in genome size when compared with their bacterial relatives. Chloroplast genomes in photosynthetic organisms are normally 120–200 kb encoding 20–200 proteins and mitochondrial genomes in humans are approximately 16 kb and encode 37 genes, 13 of which are proteins. Using the example of the freshwater amoeboid, however, Paulinella chromatophora, which contains chromatophores found to be evolved from cyanobacteria, Keeling and Archibald argue that this is not the only possible criterion; another is that the host cell has assumed control of the regulation of the former endosymbiont's division, thereby synchronizing it with the cell's own division. Nowack and her colleagues gene sequenced the chromatophore (1.02 Mb) and found that only 867 proteins were encoded by these photosynthetic cells. Comparisons with their closest free living cyanobacteria of the genus Synechococcus (having a genome size 3 Mb, with 3300 genes) revealed that chromatophores had undergone a drastic genome shrinkage. Chromatophores contained genes that were accountable for photosynthesis but were deficient in genes that could carry out other biosynthetic functions; this observation suggests that these endosymbiotic cells are highly dependent on their hosts for their survival and growth mechanisms. Thus, these chromatophores were found to be non-functional for organelle-specific purposes when compared with mitochondria and plastids. This distinction could have promoted the early evolution of photosynthetic organelles.

The loss of genetic autonomy, that is, the loss of many genes from endosymbionts, occurred very early in evolutionary time. Taking into account the entire original endosymbiont genome, there are three main possible fates for genes over evolutionary time. The first is the loss of functionally redundant genes, in which genes that are already represented in the nucleus are eventually lost. The second is the transfer of genes to the nucleus, while the third is that genes remain in the organelle that was once an organism. The loss of autonomy and integration of the endosymbiont with its host can be primarily attributed to nuclear gene transfer. As organelle genomes have been greatly reduced over evolutionary time, nuclear genes have expanded and become more complex. As a result, many plastid and mitochondrial processes are driven by nuclear encoded gene products. In addition, many nuclear genes originating from endosymbionts have acquired novel functions unrelated to their organelles.

=== Gene transfer mechanisms ===
The mechanisms of gene transfer are not fully known; however, multiple hypotheses exist to explain this phenomenon. The possible mechanisms include the Complementary DNA (cDNA) hypothesis and the bulk flow hypothesis.

The cDNA hypothesis involves the use of messenger RNA (mRNAs) to transport genes from organelles to the nucleus where they are converted to cDNA and incorporated into the genome. The cDNA hypothesis is based on studies of the genomes of flowering plants. Protein coding RNAs in mitochondria are spliced and edited using organelle-specific splice and editing sites. Nuclear copies of some mitochondrial genes, however, do not contain organelle-specific splice sites, suggesting a processed mRNA intermediate. The cDNA hypothesis has since been revised as edited mitochondrial cDNAs are unlikely to recombine with the nuclear genome and are more likely to recombine with their native mitochondrial genome. If the edited mitochondrial sequence recombines with the mitochondrial genome, mitochondrial splice sites would no longer exist in the mitochondrial genome. Any subsequent nuclear gene transfer would therefore also lack mitochondrial splice sites.

The bulk flow hypothesis is the alternative to the cDNA hypothesis, stating that escaped DNA, rather than mRNA, is the mechanism of gene transfer. According to this hypothesis, disturbances to organelles, including autophagy (normal cell destruction), gametogenesis (the formation of gametes), and cell stress release DNA which is imported into the nucleus and incorporated into the nuclear DNA using non-homologous end joining (repair of double stranded breaks). For example, in the initial stages of endosymbiosis, due to a lack of major gene transfer, the host cell had little to no control over the endosymbiont. The endosymbiont underwent cell division independently of the host cell, resulting in many "copies" of the endosymbiont within the host cell. Some of the endosymbionts lysed (burst), and high levels of DNA were incorporated into the nucleus. A similar mechanism is thought to occur in tobacco plants, which show a high rate of gene transfer and whose cells contain multiple chloroplasts. In addition, the bulk flow hypothesis is also supported by the presence of non-random clusters of organelle genes, suggesting the simultaneous movement of multiple genes.

Ford Doolittle proposed that (whatever the mechanism) gene transfer behaves like a ratchet, resulting in unidirectional transfer of genes from the organelle to the nuclear genome. When genetic material from an organelle is incorporated into the nuclear genome, either the organelle or nuclear copy of the gene may be lost from the population. If the organelle copy is lost and this is fixed, or lost through genetic drift, a gene is successfully transferred to the nucleus. If the nuclear copy is lost, horizontal gene transfer can occur again, and the cell can 'try again' to have successful transfer of genes to the nucleus. In this ratchet-like way, genes from an organelle would be expected to accumulate in the nuclear genome over evolutionary time.

== Endosymbiosis of protomitochondria ==
Endosymbiotic theory for the origin of mitochondria suggests that the proto-eukaryote engulfed a Proto-mitochondrion, and this endosymbiont became an organelle, a major step in eukaryogenesis, the creation of the eukaryotes.

=== Mitochondria ===
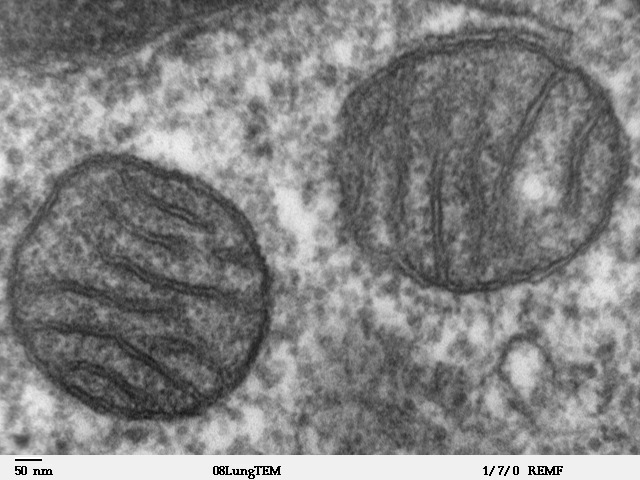
Internal symbiont: mitochondrion has a matrix and membranes, like a free-living alphaproteobacterial cell, from which it may derive.

Mitochondria are organelles that synthesize the energy-carrying molecule ATP for the cell by metabolizing carbon-based macromolecules. The presence of DNA in mitochondria and proteins, derived from mtDNA, suggest that this organelle may have been a prokaryote prior to its integration into the proto-eukaryote. Mitochondria are regarded as organelles rather than endosymbionts because mitochondria and the host cells share some parts of their genome, undergo division simultaneously, and provide each other with means to produce energy. The endomembrane system and nuclear membrane were hypothesized to have derived from the proto-mitochondria. It appears that a mitochondrion-less eukaryote has never existed, i.e. the nucleus was acquired at the same time as the mitochondria.

=== Nuclear membrane ===
The presence of a nucleus is one major difference between eukaryotes and prokaryotes. Some conserved nuclear proteins between eukaryotes and prokaryotes suggest that these two types had a common ancestor. Another theory behind nucleation is that early nuclear membrane proteins caused the cell membrane to fold and form a sphere with pores like the nuclear envelope.

As a way of forming a nuclear membrane, endosymbiosis could be expected to use less energy than if the cell was to develop a metabolic process to fold the cell membrane for the purpose. Digesting engulfed cells without energy-producing mitochondria would have been challenging for the host cell. On this view, membrane-bound bubbles or vesicles leaving the protomitochondria may have formed the nuclear envelope.

The process of symbiogenesis by which the early eukaryotic cell integrated the proto-mitochondrion likely included protection of the archaeal host genome from the release of reactive oxygen species. These would have been formed during oxidative phosphorylation and ATP production by the proto-mitochondrion. The nuclear membrane may have evolved as an adaptive innovation for protecting against nuclear genome DNA damage caused by reactive oxygen species. Substantial transfer of genes from the ancestral proto-mitochondrial genome to the nuclear genome likely occurred during early eukaryotic evolution. The greater protection of the nuclear genome against reactive oxygen species afforded by the nuclear membrane may explain the adaptive benefit of this gene transfer.

=== Endomembrane system ===
Diagram of endomembrane system in eukaryotic cell

Modern eukaryotic cells use the endomembrane system to transport products and wastes in, within, and out of cells. The membrane of nuclear envelope and endomembrane vesicles are composed of similar membrane proteins. These vesicles also share similar membrane proteins with the organelle they originated from or are traveling towards. This suggests that what formed the nuclear membrane also formed the endomembrane system. Prokaryotes do not have a complex internal membrane network like eukaryotes, but they could produce extracellular vesicles from their outer membrane. After the early prokaryote was consumed by a proto-eukaryote, the prokaryote would have continued to produce vesicles that accumulated within the cell. Interaction of internal components of vesicles may have led to the endoplasmic reticulum and the Golgi apparatus, both being parts of the endomembrane system.

=== Cytoplasm ===
The syntrophy hypothesis, proposed by López-García and Moreira in 1998, suggested that eukaryotes arose by combining the metabolic capabilities of an archaean, a fermenting deltaproteobacterium, and a methanotrophic alphaproteobacterium which became the mitochondrion. In 2020, the same team updated their syntrophy proposal to cover an promethearchaeon that produced hydrogen with deltaproteobacterium that oxidised sulphur. A third organism, an alphaproteobacterium able to respire both aerobically and anaerobically, and to oxidise sulphur, developed into the mitochondrion; it may possibly also have been able to photosynthesise.

=== Date ===
The question of when the transition from prokaryotic to eukaryotic form occurred and when the first crown group eukaryotes appeared on earth is unresolved. The oldest known body fossils that can be positively assigned to the Eukaryota are acanthomorphic acritarchs from the 1.631 Gya Deonar Formation of India. These fossils can still be identified as derived post-nuclear eukaryotes with a sophisticated, morphology-generating cytoskeleton sustained by mitochondria. This fossil evidence indicates that endosymbiotic acquisition of alphaproteobacteria must have occurred before 1.6 Gya. Molecular clocks have also been used to estimate the last eukaryotic common ancestor, however these methods have large inherent uncertainty and give a wide range of dates. Reasonable results include the estimate of c. 1.8 Gya. A 2.3 Gya estimate also seems reasonable, and has the added attraction of coinciding with one of the most pronounced biogeochemical perturbations in Earth history, the early Palaeoproterozoic Great Oxygenation Event. The marked increase in atmospheric oxygen concentrations at that time has been suggested as a contributing cause of eukaryogenesis, inducing the evolution of oxygen-detoxifying mitochondria. Alternatively, the Great Oxidation Event might be a consequence of eukaryogenesis, and its impact on the export and burial of organic carbon.

== Organellar genomes ==
=== Plastomes and mitogenomes ===
The human mitochondrial genome has retained genes encoding 2 rRNAs (blue), 22 tRNAs (white), and 13 redox proteins (yellow, orange, red).

Some endosymbiont genes remain in the organelles. Plastids and mitochondria retain genes encoding rRNAs, tRNAs, proteins involved in redox reactions, and proteins required for transcription, translation, and replication. There are many hypotheses to explain why organelles retain a small portion of their genome; however no one hypothesis will apply to all organisms, and the topic is still quite controversial. The hydrophobicity hypothesis states that highly hydrophobic (water hating) proteins (such as the membrane bound proteins involved in redox reactions) are not easily transported through the cytosol and therefore these proteins must be encoded in their respective organelles. The code disparity hypothesis states that the limit on transfer is due to differing genetic codes and RNA editing between the organelle and the nucleus. The redox control hypothesis states that genes encoding redox reaction proteins are retained in order to effectively couple the need for repair and the synthesis of these proteins. For example, if one of the photosystems is lost from the plastid, the intermediate electron carriers may lose or gain too many electrons, signalling the need for repair of a photosystem. The time delay involved in signalling the nucleus and transporting a cytosolic protein to the organelle results in the production of damaging reactive oxygen species. The final hypothesis states that the assembly of membrane proteins, particularly those involved in redox reactions, requires coordinated synthesis and assembly of subunits; however, translation and protein transport coordination is more difficult to control in the cytoplasm.

=== Non-photosynthetic plastid genomes ===
The majority of the genes in the mitochondria and plastids are related to the expression (transcription, translation and replication) of genes encoding proteins involved in either photosynthesis (in plastids) or cellular respiration (in mitochondria). One might predict that the loss of photosynthesis or cellular respiration would allow for the complete loss of the plastid genome or the mitochondrial genome respectively. While there are numerous examples of mitochondrial descendants (mitosomes and hydrogenosomes) that have lost their entire organellar genome, non-photosynthetic plastids tend to retain a small genome. There are two main hypotheses to explain this occurrence:

The essential tRNA hypothesis notes that there have been no documented functional plastid-to-nucleus gene transfers of genes encoding RNA products (tRNAs and rRNAs). As a result, plastids must make their own functional RNAs or import nuclear counterparts. The genes encoding tRNA-Glu and tRNA-fmet, however, appear to be indispensable. The plastid is responsible for haem biosynthesis, which requires plastid encoded tRNA-Glu (from the gene trnE) as a precursor molecule. Like other genes encoding RNAs, trnE cannot be transferred to the nucleus. In addition, it is unlikely trnE could be replaced by a cytosolic tRNA-Glu as trnE is highly conserved; single base changes in trnE have resulted in the loss of haem synthesis. The gene for tRNA-formylmethionine (tRNA-fmet) is also encoded in the plastid genome and is required for translation initiation in both plastids and mitochondria. A plastid is required to continue expressing the gene for tRNA-fmet so long as the mitochondrion is translating proteins.

The limited window hypothesis offers a more general explanation for the retention of genes in non-photosynthetic plastids. According to this hypothesis, genes are transferred to the nucleus following the disturbance of organelles. Disturbance was common in the early stages of endosymbiosis, however, once the host cell gained control of organelle division, eukaryotes could evolve to have only one plastid per cell. Having only one plastid severely limits gene transfer as the lysis of the single plastid would likely result in cell death. Consistent with this hypothesis, organisms with multiple plastids show an 80-fold increase in plastid-to-nucleus gene transfer compared with organisms with single plastids.

== Evidence ==
There are many lines of evidence that mitochondria and plastids including chloroplasts arose from bacteria.

- New mitochondria and plastids are formed only through binary fission, the form of cell division used by bacteria and archaea.
- If a cell's mitochondria or chloroplasts are removed, the cell does not have the means to create new ones. In some algae, such as Euglena, the plastids can be destroyed by certain chemicals or prolonged absence of light without otherwise affecting the cell: the plastids do not regenerate.
- Transport proteins called porins are found in the outer membranes of mitochondria and chloroplasts and are also found in bacterial cell membranes.
- A membrane lipid cardiolipin is exclusively found in the inner mitochondrial membrane and bacterial cell membranes.
- Some mitochondria and some plastids contain single circular DNA molecules that are similar to the DNA of bacteria both in size and structure.
- Genome comparisons suggest a close relationship between mitochondria and Alphaproteobacteria.
- Genome comparisons suggest a close relationship between plastids and cyanobacteria.
- Many genes in the genomes of mitochondria and chloroplasts have been lost or transferred to the nucleus of the host cell. Consequently, the chromosomes of many eukaryotes contain genes that originated from the genomes of mitochondria and plastids.
- Mitochondria and plastids contain their own ribosomes; these are more similar to those of bacteria (70S) than those of eukaryotes.
- Proteins created by mitochondria and chloroplasts use N-formylmethionine as the initiating amino acid, as do proteins created by bacteria but not proteins created by eukaryotic nuclear genes or archaea.
Comparison of chloroplasts and cyanobacteria showing their similarities. Both chloroplasts and cyanobacteria have a double membrane, DNA, ribosomes, and chlorophyll-containing thylakoids.

== Secondary endosymbiosis ==
Primary endosymbiosis involves the engulfment of a cell by another free living organism. Secondary endosymbiosis occurs when the product of primary endosymbiosis is itself engulfed and retained by another free living eukaryote. Secondary endosymbiosis has occurred several times and has given rise to extremely diverse groups of algae and other eukaryotes. Some organisms can take opportunistic advantage of a similar process, where they engulf an alga and use the products of its photosynthesis, but once the prey item dies (or is lost) the host returns to a free living state. Obligate secondary endosymbionts become dependent on their acquired organelles and are unable to survive without them. A secondary endosymbiosis event involving an ancestral red alga and a heterotrophic eukaryote resulted in the evolution of several other photosynthetic lineages including Cryptophyta, Haptophyta, Stramenopiles, and Alveolata.

A possible secondary endosymbiosis has been observed in process in the heterotrophic protist Hatena. This organism behaves like a predator until it ingests a green alga, which loses its flagella and cytoskeleton, and lives as a symbiont. Hatena, now a host, switches to photosynthetic nutrition, gains the ability to move towards light, and loses its feeding apparatus.

The morphology, biochemistry, genomic organisation, and molecular phylogeny of plastid RNAs and proteins suggest a single origin of all extant plastids.

== Nitroplasts ==
A unicellular marine alga, Braarudosphaera bigelowii (a coccolithophore, which is a eukaryote), has been found with a cyanobacterium as an endosymbiont. The cyanobacterium forms a nitrogen-fixing structure, the nitroplast. It divides evenly when the host cell undergoes mitosis, and many of its proteins derive from the host alga, implying that the endosymbiont has proceeded far along the path towards becoming an organelle. The cyanobacterium is named Candidatus Atelocyanobacterium thalassa, and is abbreviated UCYN-A. The alga is the first eukaryote known to fix nitrogen.

== See also ==
- Angomonas deanei, a protozoan that harbours an obligate bacterial symbiont
- Hydrogen hypothesis, the theory that mitochondria were acquired by hydrogen-dependent archaea, their endosymbionts being facultatively anaerobic bacteria
- Kleptoplasty, the sequestering of plastids from ingested algae
- Mixotricha paradoxa, which itself is a symbiont, contains numerous endosymbiotic bacteria
- Parakaryon myojinensis, a possible result of endosymbiosis independent of eukaryotes
- Parasite Eve, fiction about endosymbiosis
- Strigomonas culicis, another protozoan that harbours an obligate bacterial symbiont
- Viral eukaryogenesis, hypothesis that the cell nucleus originated from endosymbiosis
