= Konstantin Mereschkowski =

Russian lichenologist and evolutionary biologist

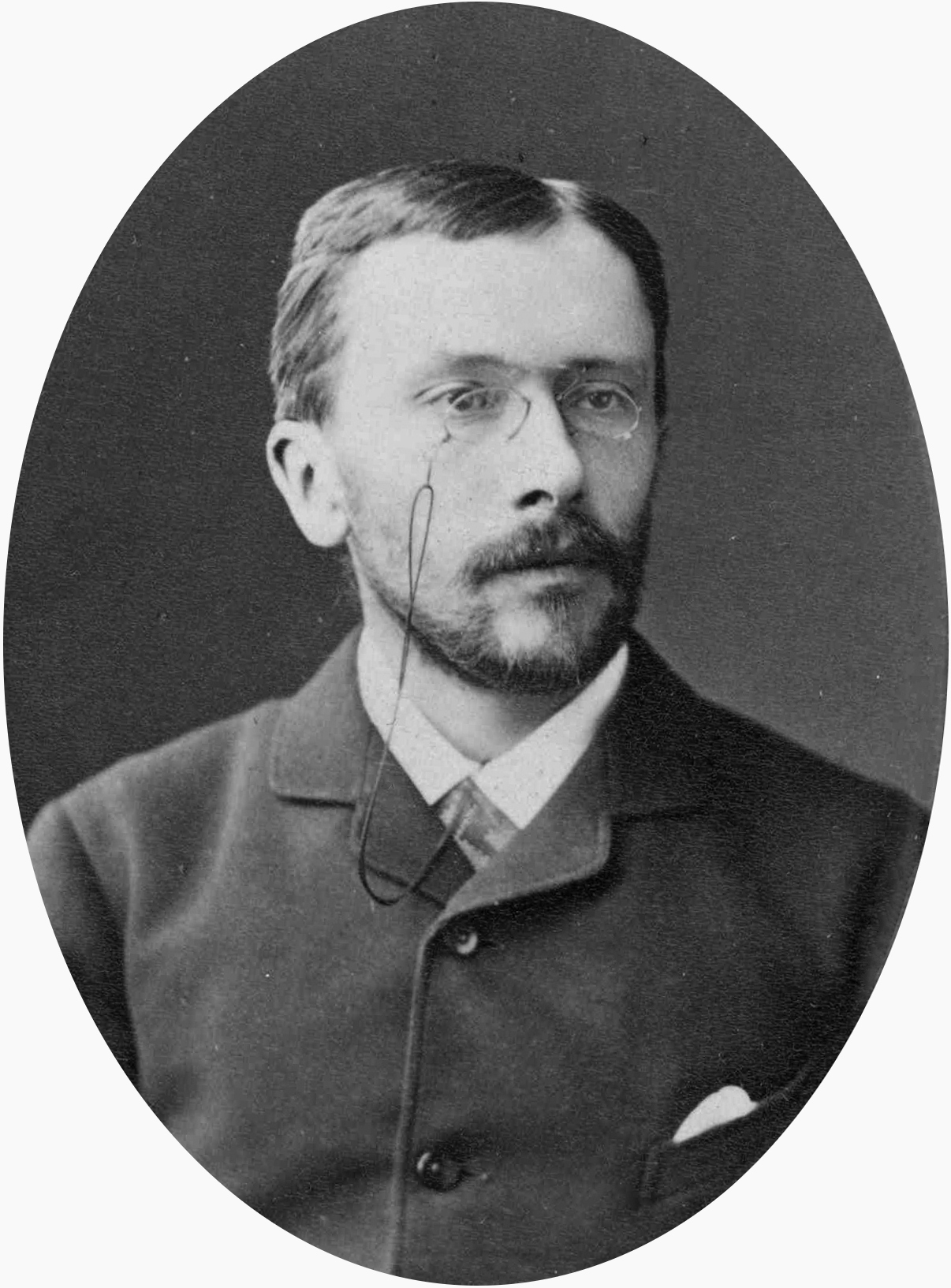
- Mereschkowski c. 1885
- Born: 4 August 1855; Saint Petersburg, Russia
- Died: 9 January 1921 (aged 65); Geneva, Switzerland
- Citizenship: Russian
- Education: University of Saint Petersburg
- Known for: Theory of symbiogenesis
- Spouse: Olga Petrovna Sultanova
- Scientific career
- Fields: Lichens; Diatoms; Hydrozoa
- Workplaces: University of Kazan
- Author abbrev. (botany): Mereschk.

Konstantin Sergeevich Mereschkowski (Note: His first name is transliterated variously as Konstantin or Constantin. His patronymic is transliterated as Sergeevich, Sergivich, Sergeevič, Sergejewitsch, or Sergejewicz. His surname is transliterated as Mereschkowski, Merezhkovsky, Merezjkovski, Mérejkovski, Mereschcowsky, Mereschkovsky, Merezhkowski, and Merežkovskij.) (Russian: Константи́н Серге́евич Мережко́вский, IPA: [mʲɪrʲɪˈʂkofskʲɪj]; 4 August 1855 [O.S. 23 July] – 9 January 1921) was a Russian biologist and botanist, active mainly around Kazan, whose research on lichens led him to propose the theory of symbiogenesis – that larger, more complex cells (of eukaryotes) evolved from the symbiotic relationship between less complex ones. He presented this theory in 1910, in his work, The Theory of Two Plasms as the Basis of Symbiogenesis, a New Study of the Origins of Organisms, although the fundamentals of the idea had already appeared in his earlier 1905 work, The nature and origins of chromatophores in the plant kingdom.

== Biography ==
=== Early life ===
Konstantin was born in Saint Petersburg, one of six sons and three daughters in the Mereschkowski family. His father, Sergey Ivanovich, served as a senior official in several Russian local governors' cabinets (including that of I.D. Talyzin in Orenburg) before entering Alexander II's court office as a privy councillor. His mother, Varvara Vasilyevna (née Tcherkasova), was a daughter of a senior Saint Petersburg security official, and was fond of arts and literature. The writer Dmitry Merezhkovsky (1866–1941) was one of his younger brothers.

From 1875 to 1880 he worked for his degree at the University of Saint Petersburg, travelling north to the White Sea to examine marine invertebrates and discovering a genus of Hydrozoa. On graduating he travelled to France and Germany, meeting famous scientists; he published on anthropology and animal pigments while in Paris.

=== Career ===
In 1883 he married Olga Petrovna Sultanova, and became a lecturer at the University of Saint Petersburg. In 1886 they emigrated from Russia for unexplained reasons, possibly connected to the acts of paedophilia for which he was later prosecuted. The family set up home in Crimea, where he found work as a botanist looking at varieties of grape; he also created a substantial collection of diatoms from the Black Sea. In 1898, he left his wife and young son in Crimea and emigrated to America, where he took the name "William Adler". He worked in California as a botanist at Los Angeles and University of California, Berkeley, devising a new system of classification of the diatoms based on the internal structures of the specimens in his Black Sea collection. In 1902, he returned to Russia to become curator of zoology at Kazan University; he became a lecturer there in 1904, and started to develop his ideas on the symbiotic origins of complex cells. In 1913 he edited the exsiccata Lichenes Rossiae exsiccati a Prof. D-re C. Mereschkovsky editi. In 1914 he was prosecuted for raping more than two dozen girls. He had earlier escaped Saint Petersburg in 1886 and the Crimea in 1898 for fear of being prosecuted for similar crimes. He was dismissed from Kazan University, and escaped to France. In 1918 he moved to the Conservatoire Botanique in Geneva, where he worked on Jules Paul Benjamin Delessert's lichen collection and distributed the exsiccata Lichenes Ticinenses exsiccati, rariores vel novi, pro parte ex aliis pagis provenientes, editi a Prof. Dre. C. Mereschkovsky.

=== Death ===
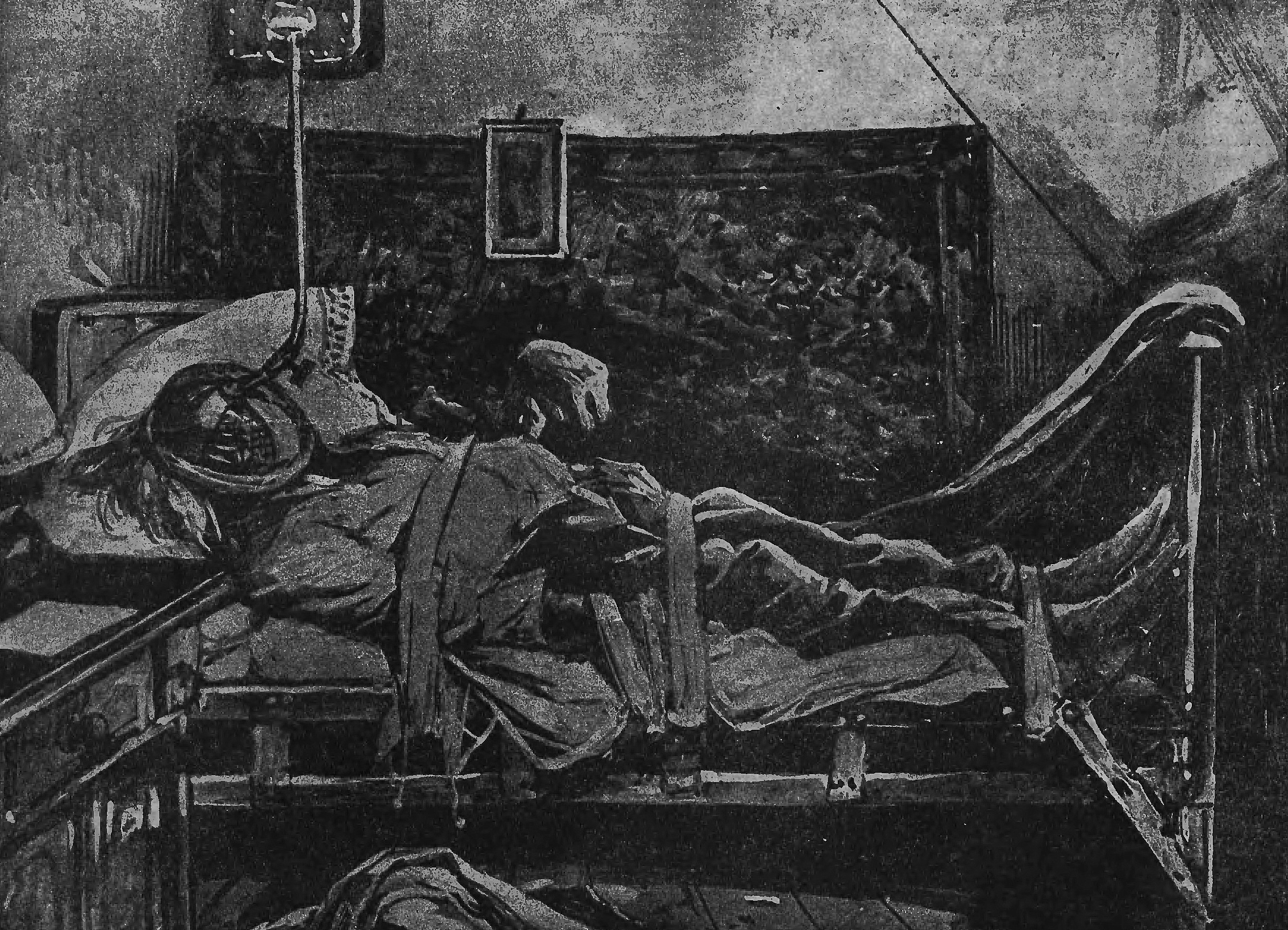
Suicide scene of Konstantin Mereschkowski

In Geneva, he became seriously depressed, ran out of money, and on 9 January 1921 he was found dead in his hotel room, having tied himself up in his bed with a mask which was supplied with an asphyxiating gas from a metal container. It appears that his suicide was directly connected to his paedophilic utopian beliefs (reflected in his 1903 book of stories, Earthly Paradise, or a Winter Night's Dream. Tales from the 27th century) as well as his view that he was becoming too old and frail to continue his history of child abuse. As an atheist, his dreamed-of utopia was to be scientifically based, involving the evolution of a perfect human race of paedophiles held aloft by the enslavement of Africans, Asians, and others. The Earthly Paradise describes specially-bred castes of human including one of neotenised, sexualizing children prolonged into adult age - still displaying child-like features and behaviour - who were put to death at the age of 35, as they could not be happy in old age. Further, he held extreme ideological beliefs on eugenics and antisemitism. He actively assisted the far-right Black Hundredist organisation the Kazan Department of the Union of Russian People, and provided secret assistance to the Ministry of Internal Affairs in hunting down Jews and supposed traitors.

== Symbiogenesis ==
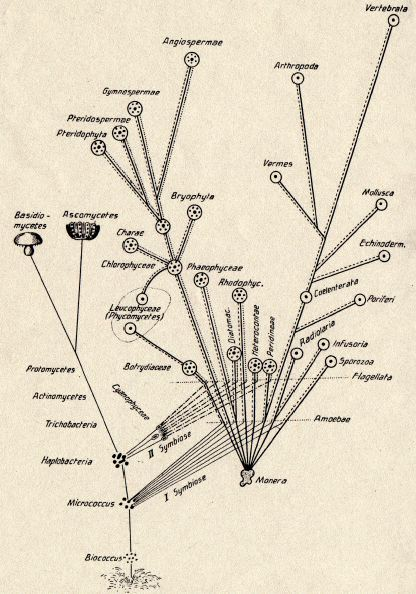
Mereschkowski's tree-of-life diagram, showing the origin of complex life-forms by two episodes of symbiogenesis, the incorporation of symbiotic bacteria, 1905

Mereschkowski argued that the cell organelles, the nucleus and the chloroplast, are the descendants of bacteria that evolved into an intracellular symbiosis with amoebae. His work was influenced by the French botanist Andreas Franz Wilhelm Schimper who had noted that chloroplasts resembled cyanobacteria. Mereschkowski's ideas are according to K. V. Kowallik "strikingly" reflected in the modern symbiogenesis theory developed and popularised by Ivan Wallin and Lynn Margulis, and now widely accepted. The modern view is that two endosymbiotic events did take place, one by incorporating bacteria that became the mitochondria of all eukaryotes, and another soon afterwards in the line that became the plants to form chloroplasts.

Around the turn of the century, Mereschkowski formed a sizeable lichen collection, containing over 2000 specimens from Russia, Austria and around the Mediterranean. The collection remains at Kazan University. It had recently been shown that each lichen species consisted of a mutualistic symbiosis between a fungus and one or more algae. This may have inspired his theory of symbiogenesis. Mereschkowski rejected Darwinian evolution, believing that natural selection could not explain biological novelty. He argued instead that the acquisition and inheritance of microbes was central. He was criticised and even ridiculed by other biologists, such as the Polish lichenologist Alexandr Alexandrovich Elenkin.

== Eponyms ==
Species named after Mereschkowski include Plowrightia mereschkowskyi Vouaux (1912), Physcia mereschkowskii Tomin (1926), and Caloplaca mereschkowskiana S.Y.Kondr. & Kärnefelt (2011).
