= Lynn Margulis =

American evolutionary biologist (1938–2011)

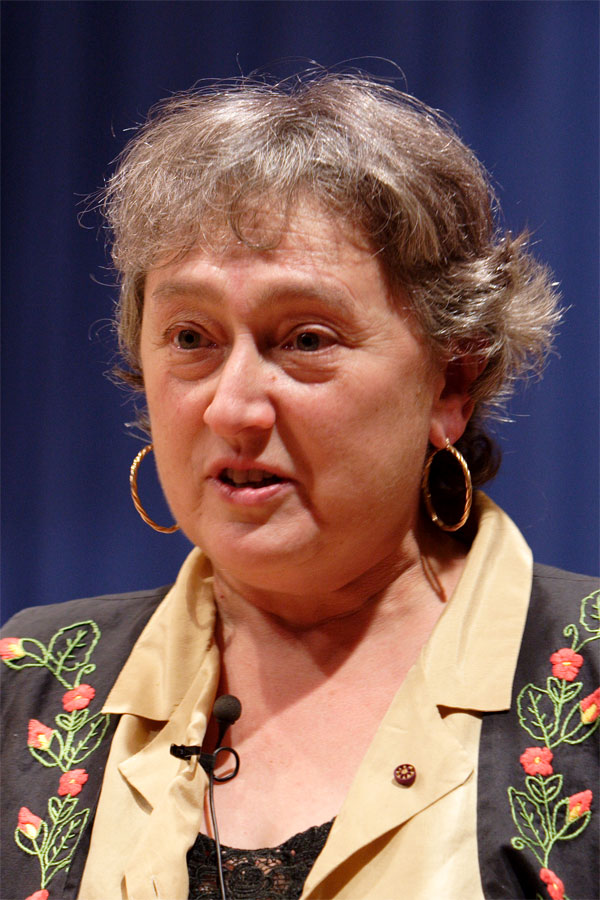
- Margulis in 2005
- Born: Lynn Petra Alexander; March 5, 1938; Chicago, Illinois, U.S.
- Died: November 22, 2011 (aged 73); Amherst, Massachusetts, U.S.
- Education: University of Chicago; University of Wisconsin–Madison; University of California, Berkeley
- Known for: Symbiogenesis; Gaia hypothesis
- Spouses: Carl Sagan (m. 1957; div. 1965); Thomas Margulis (m. 1967; div. 1980)
- Children: 4, including Dorion Sagan
- Awards: National Medal of Science (1999); William Procter Prize for Scientific Achievement (1999); Darwin-Wallace Medal (2008)
- Scientific career
- Fields: Biology
- Workplaces: Brandeis University; Boston University; University of Massachusetts Amherst
- Thesis: An Unusual Pattern of Thymidine Incorporation in Euglena (1965)
- Doctoral advisor: Max Alfert

Lynn Margulis (born Lynn Petra Alexander; March 5, 1938 – November 22, 2011) was an American evolutionary biologist, who was the primary modern proponent for the significance of symbiosis in evolution. In particular, Margulis transformed and fundamentally framed biologists' understanding of the evolution of the eukaryotes, organisms with nuclei in their cells. She proposed that they came into being by symbiotic mergers of bacteria. Margulis was the co-developer of the Gaia hypothesis with the British chemist James Lovelock, proposing that the Earth functions as a unified self-regulating system, and the principal defender and promulgator of the five kingdom classification of Robert Whittaker.

Throughout her career, Margulis' work could arouse intense objections, and her formative paper, "On the Origin of Mitosing Cells", appeared in 1967 after being rejected by about fifteen journals. Still a junior faculty member at Boston University at the time, her theory that cell organelles such as mitochondria and chloroplasts were once independent bacteria was largely ignored for another decade, becoming widely accepted only after it was powerfully substantiated through genetic evidence. Margulis was elected a member of the US National Academy of Sciences in 1983. President Bill Clinton presented her the National Medal of Science in 1999. The Linnean Society of London awarded her the Darwin-Wallace Medal in 2008.

Margulis was a strong critic of neo-Darwinism. Her position sparked lifelong debate with leading neo-Darwinian biologists, including Richard Dawkins, George C. Williams, and John Maynard Smith. Margulis' work on symbiosis and her endosymbiotic theory had important predecessors, going back to the mid-19th century – notably Andreas Franz Wilhelm Schimper, Konstantin Mereschkowski, Boris Kozo-Polyansky, and Ivan Wallin – and Margulis not only promoted greater recognition for their contributions, but personally oversaw the first English translation of Kozo-Polyansky's Symbiogenesis: A New Principle of Evolution, which appeared the year before her death. Many of her major works, particularly those intended for a general readership, were collaboratively written with her son Dorion Sagan.

In 2002, Discover magazine recognized Margulis as one of the 50 most important women in science.

== Early life and education ==
Lynn Petra Alexander was born on March 5, 1938 in Chicago, to a Jewish family. Her parents were Morris Alexander and Leona Wise Alexander. She was the eldest of four daughters. Her father was an attorney who also ran a company that made road paints. Her mother operated a travel agency. She entered Hyde Park High School in 1952, describing herself as a bad student who frequently had to stand in the corner.

A precocious child, she was accepted at the University of Chicago Laboratory Schools at the age of fifteen. In 1957, at age 19, she earned a BA from the University of Chicago in Liberal Arts. She joined the University of Wisconsin to study biology under Hans Ris and Walter Plaut, graduating in 1960 with an MS in genetics and zoology. (Her first publication, published with Plaut in 1958 in the Journal of Protozoology, was on the genetics of Euglena, which are flagellates that have features of both animals and plants.) She then pursued research at the University of California, Berkeley, under the zoologist Max Alfert. Before she could complete her dissertation, she was offered research associateship and then lectureship at Brandeis University in Massachusetts in 1964. It was while working there that she obtained her PhD from the University of California, Berkeley in 1965. Her thesis was An Unusual Pattern of Thymidine Incorporation in Euglena.

== Career ==
In 1966 she moved to Boston University, where she taught biology for twenty-two years. She was initially an Adjunct Assistant Professor, then was appointed to Assistant Professor in 1967. She was promoted to Associate Professor in 1971, to full Professor in 1977, and to University Professor in 1986. In 1988 she was appointed Distinguished Professor of Botany at the University of Massachusetts at Amherst. She was Distinguished Professor of Biology in 1993. In 1997 she transferred to the Department of Geosciences at UMass Amherst to become Distinguished Professor of Geosciences "with great delight", the post which she held until her death.

=== Endosymbiosis theory ===
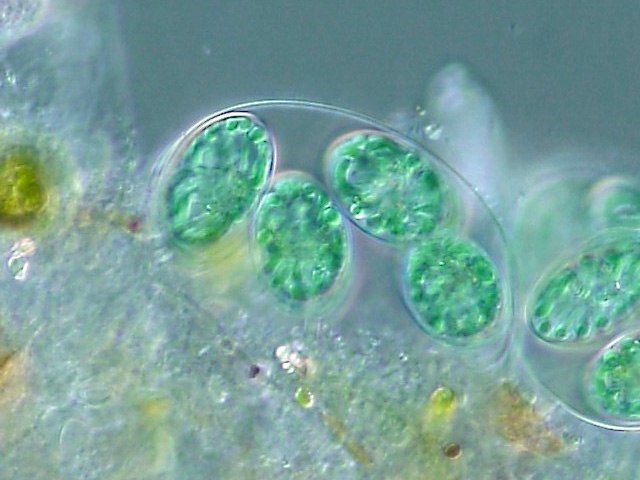
The chloroplasts of glaucophytes like this Glaucocystis have a peptidoglycan layer, evidence of their endosymbiotic origin from cyanobacteria.

In 1966, as a young faculty member at Boston University, Margulis wrote a theoretical paper titled "On the Origin of Mitosing Cells". The paper, however, was "rejected by about fifteen scientific journals," she recalled. It was finally accepted by Journal of Theoretical Biology and is considered today a landmark in modern endosymbiotic theory. Weathering constant criticism of her ideas for decades, Margulis was famous for her tenacity in pushing her theory forward, despite the opposition she faced at the time. The descent of mitochondria from bacteria and of chloroplasts from cyanobacteria was experimentally demonstrated in 1978 by Robert Schwartz and Margaret Dayhoff. This formed the first experimental evidence for the symbiogenesis theory. The endosymbiosis theory of organogenesis became widely accepted in the early 1980s, after the genetic material of mitochondria and chloroplasts had been found to be significantly different from that of the symbiont's nuclear DNA.

In 1995, English evolutionary biologist Richard Dawkins had this to say about Lynn Margulis and her work:

I greatly admire Lynn Margulis's sheer courage and stamina in sticking by the endosymbiosis theory, and carrying it through from being an unorthodoxy to an orthodoxy. I'm referring to the theory that the eukaryotic cell is a symbiotic union of primitive prokaryotic cells. This is one of the great achievements of twentieth-century evolutionary biology, and I greatly admire her for it.

=== Symbiosis as evolutionary force ===
Margulis opposed competition-oriented views of evolution, stressing the importance of co-operative and mutualistic (then called 'symbiotic') relationships between species.

She later formulated a theory that proposed mutualistic relationships between organisms of different phyla, or kingdoms, as the driving force of evolution, and explained genetic variation as occurring mainly through transfer of nuclear information between bacterial cells or viruses and eukaryotic cells. Her organelle genesis ideas are widely accepted, but the proposal that symbiotic relationships explain most genetic variation is still something of a fringe idea.

Margulis also held a negative view of certain interpretations of Neo-Darwinism that she felt were excessively focused on competition between organisms, as she believed that history will ultimately judge them as comprising "a minor twentieth-century religious sect within the sprawling religious persuasion of Anglo-Saxon Biology." She wrote that proponents of the standard theory "wallow in their zoological, capitalistic, competitive, cost-benefit interpretation of Darwin – having mistaken him ... Neo-Darwinism, which insists on [the slow accrual of mutations by gene-level natural selection], is in a complete funk."

=== Gaia hypothesis ===
Margulis initially sought out the advice of James Lovelock for her own research: she explained that, "In the early seventies, I was trying to align bacteria by their metabolic pathways. I noticed that all kinds of bacteria produced gases. Oxygen, hydrogen sulfide, carbon dioxide, nitrogen, ammonia — more than thirty different gases are given off by the bacteria whose evolutionary history I was keen to reconstruct. Why did every scientist I asked believe that atmospheric oxygen was a biological product, but the other atmospheric gases — nitrogen, methane, sulfur, and so on — were not? 'Go talk to Lovelock,' at least four different scientists suggested. Lovelock believed that the gases in the atmosphere were biological."

Margulis met with Lovelock, who explained his Gaia hypothesis to her, and very soon they began an intense collaborative effort on the concept. One of the earliest significant publications on Gaia was a 1974 paper co-authored by Lovelock and Margulis, which succinctly defined the hypothesis as follows: "The notion of the biosphere as an active adaptive control system able to maintain the Earth in homeostasis we are calling the 'Gaia hypothesis.'"

Like other early presentations of Lovelock's idea, the Lovelock-Margulis 1974 paper seemed to give living organisms complete agency in creating planetary self-regulation, whereas later, as the idea matured, this planetary-scale self-regulation was recognized as an emergent property of the Earth system, life and its physical environment taken together.

When climatologist Stephen Schneider convened the 1989 American Geophysical Union's Chapman Conference around the issue of Gaia, the idea of "strong Gaia" and "weak Gaia" was introduced by James Kirchner — after which Margulis was sometimes incorrectly associated with the idea of "weak Gaia". Her 1995 essay "Gaia is a Tough Bitch" laid out her distinction from Lovelock as she saw it — which was primarily that she did not like the metaphor of Earth as a single organism, because, she said, "No organism eats its own waste". In her 1998 book Symbiotic Planet, Margulis explored the relationship between Gaia and her work on symbiosis.

=== Five kingdoms of life ===
In 1969, life on earth was classified into five kingdoms, as introduced by Robert Whittaker. Margulis became an early supporter as well as critic. While supporting parts, she was the first to recognize the limitations of Whittaker's classification of microbes. But newly discovered organisms such as the archaea and the emergence of molecular taxonomy challenged the concept. By the mid 2000-aughts most scientists began to agree that there are more than five kingdoms. Contrarily, Margulis became the most important defender of the five-kingdom classification. She rejected the three-domain system introduced by Carl Woese in 1990, which gained wide acceptance. She introduced a modified classification by which all life forms, including those newly discovered, could be accounted for in the 'classical' five kingdoms.

According to Margulis, the main problem lay with the treatment of archaea, which in her view should be grouped with bacteria under the kingdom Prokaryotae. This contrasts with both the three-domain system——which treats archaea as a domain (and a higher taxon than kingdom)—and with the six-kingdom system, (which holds that archaea is a separate kingdom). Margulis' concept is given in detail in her book Five Kingdoms, written with Karlene V. Schwartz. It has been suggested that it is mainly because of Margulis that the five-kingdom concept survives.

=== Metamorphosis theory ===
In 2009, via a then-standard publication-process known as "communicated submission" (which bypassed traditional peer review), she was instrumental in getting the Proceedings of the National Academy of Sciences (PNAS) to publish a paper by Donald I. Williamson rejecting "the Darwinian assumption that larvae and their adults evolved from a single common ancestor." Williamson's paper provoked immediate response from the scientific community, including a countering paper in PNAS. Conrad Labandeira of the Smithsonian National Museum of Natural History said, "If I was reviewing [Williamson's paper] I would probably opt to reject it," he says, "but I'm not saying it's a bad thing that this is published. What it may do is broaden the discussion on how metamorphosis works and [...] [on] the origin of these very radical life cycles." But Duke University insect developmental biologist Fred Nijhout said that the paper was better suited for the "National Enquirer than the National Academy."

=== AIDS/HIV theory ===
In 2009 Margulis and seven others authored a position paper concerning research on the viability of round body forms of some spirochetes, "Syphilis, Lyme disease, & AIDS: Resurgence of 'the great imitator'?" which states that, "Detailed research that correlates life histories of symbiotic spirochetes to changes in the immune system of associated vertebrates is sorely needed", and urging the "reinvestigation of the natural history of mammalian, tick-borne, and venereal transmission of spirochetes in relation to impairment of the human immune system". The paper went on to suggest "that the possible direct causal involvement of spirochetes and their round bodies to symptoms of immune deficiency be carefully and vigorously investigated".

In a Discover Magazine interview, Margulis explained her reason for interest in the topic of the 2009 "AIDS" paper: "I'm interested in spirochetes only because of our ancestry. I'm not interested in the diseases", and stated that she had called them "symbionts" because both the spirochete which causes syphilis (Treponema) and the spirochete which causes Lyme disease (Borrelia) only retain about 20% of the genes they would need to live freely, outside of their human hosts.

However, in the Discover Magazine interview Margulis said that "the set of symptoms, or syndrome, presented by syphilitics overlaps completely with another syndrome: AIDS", and also noted that Kary Mullis (Note: Kary Mullis won the 1993 Nobel Prize for the polymerase chain reaction, and was known for his unconventional scientific views.) said that "he went looking for a reference substantiating that HIV causes AIDS and discovered, 'There is no such document' ".

This provoked a widespread supposition that Margulis had been an "AIDS denialist". Jerry Coyne reacted on his Why Evolution is True blog against his interpretation that Margulis believed "that AIDS is really syphilis, not viral in origin at all." Seth Kalichman, a social psychologist who studies behavioral and social aspects of AIDS, cited her [Margulis] 2009 paper as an example of AIDS denialism "flourishing", and asserted that her [Margulis] "endorsement of HIV/AIDS denialism defies understanding".

== Reception ==
Historian Jan Sapp has said that "Lynn Margulis's name is as synonymous with symbiosis as Charles Darwin's is with evolution." She has been called "science's unruly earth mother", a "vindicated heretic", or a scientific "rebel", It has been suggested that initial rejection of Margulis' work on the endosymbiotic theory, and the controversial nature of it as well as Gaia theory, made her identify throughout her career with scientific mavericks, outsiders, and unaccepted theories generally.

In the last decade of her life, while key components of her life's work began to be understood as fundamental to a modern scientific viewpoint – the widespread adoption of Earth System Science and the incorporation of key parts of endosymbiotic theory into biology curricula worldwide – Margulis if anything became more embroiled in controversy, not less. Journalist John Wilson explained this by saying that Lynn Margulis "defined herself by oppositional science," and in the commemorative collection of essays Lynn Margulis: The Life and Legacy of a Scientific Rebel, commentators again and again depict her as a modern embodiment of the "scientific rebel", akin to Freeman Dyson's 1995 essay The Scientist as Rebel, a tradition Dyson saw embodied in Benjamin Franklin, and which Dyson believed to be essential to good science.

== Awards and recognitions ==
- 1975, Elected Fellow of the American Association for the Advancement of Science.
- 1978, Guggenheim Fellowship.
- 1983, Elected to the National Academy of Sciences.
- 1985, Guest Hagey Lecturer, University of Waterloo.
- 1986, Miescher-Ishida Prize.
- 1989, conferred the Commandeur de l'Ordre des Palmes Académiques de France.
- 1992, Chancellor's Medal for Distinguished Faculty of the University of Massachusetts at Amherst.
- 1995, elected Fellow of the World Academy of Art and Science.
- 1997, elected to the Russian Academy of Natural Sciences.
- 1998, papers permanently archived in the Library of Congress, Washington, D.C.
- 1998, the Distinguished Service Award of the American Institute of Biological Sciences.
- 1998, elected Fellow of the American Academy of Arts and Sciences.
- 1999, the William Procter Prize for Scientific Achievement.
- 1999, the National Medal of Science, awarded by President William J. Clinton.
- 2001, Golden Plate Award of the American Academy of Achievement
- 2002–05, Alexander von Humboldt Prize.
- 2005, elected President of Sigma Xi, The Scientific Research Society.
- 2006, Founded Sciencewriters Books with her son Dorion.
- 2008, one of thirteen recipients in 2008 of the Darwin-Wallace Medal, heretofore bestowed every 50 years, by the Linnean Society of London.
- 2010, inductee into the Leonardo da Vinci Society of Thinking at the University of Advancing Technology in Tempe, Arizona.
- 2010, NASA Public Service Award for Astrobiology.
- 2012, Lynn Margulis Symposium: Celebrating a Life in Science, University of Massachusetts, Amherst, March 23–25, 2012.
- 2017, the Journal of Theoretical Biology 434, 1–114 commemorated the 50th anniversary of "The origin of mitosing cells" with a special issue
- Honorary doctorate from 15 universities.

== Personal life ==
Margulis married astronomer Carl Sagan in 1957 soon after she got her bachelor's degree. Sagan was then a graduate student in physics at the University of Chicago. Their marriage ended in 1964, just before she completed her PhD. They had two sons, Dorion Sagan, who later became a popular science writer and her collaborator, and Jeremy Sagan, software developer and founder of Sagan Technology.

In 1967 she married Thomas N. Margulis, a crystallographer. They had a son named Zachary Margulis-Ohnuma, a New York City criminal defense lawyer, and a daughter Jennifer Margulis, teacher and author. They divorced in 1980.

She commented, "I quit my job as a wife twice," and, "it's not humanly possible to be a good wife, a good mother, and a first-class scientist. No one can do it — something has to go."

In the 2000s she had a relationship with fellow biologist Ricardo Guerrero.

Margulis argued that the September 11 attacks were a "false-flag operation, which has been used to justify the wars in Afghanistan and Iraq as well as unprecedented assaults on [...] civil liberties." She wrote that there was "overwhelming evidence that the three buildings [of the World Trade Center] collapsed by controlled demolition."

She was a religious agnostic, and a staunch evolutionist, but rejected the modern evolutionary synthesis, and said: "I remember waking up one day with an epiphanous revelation: I am not a neo-Darwinist! I recalled an earlier experience, when I realized that I wasn't a humanistic Jew. Although I greatly admire Darwin's contributions and agree with most of his theoretical analysis and I am a Darwinist, I am not a neo-Darwinist." She argued that "Natural selection eliminates and maybe maintains, but it doesn't create", and maintained that symbiosis was the major driver of evolutionary change.

Margulis died on November 22, 2011, at home in Amherst, Massachusetts, five days after suffering a hemorrhagic stroke. As her wish, she was cremated and her ashes were scattered in her favorite research areas, near her home.

== Works ==
=== Books ===
- Margulis, Lynn (1970). Origin of Eukaryotic Cells, Yale University Press, ISBN 0-300-01353-1
- Margulis, Lynn (1982). Early Life, Science Books International, ISBN 0-86720-005-7
- Margulis, Lynn, and Dorion Sagan (1986). Origins of Sex: Three Billion Years of Genetic Recombination, Yale University Press, ISBN 0-300-03340-0
- Margulis, Lynn, and Dorion Sagan (1987). Microcosmos: Four Billion Years of Evolution from Our Microbial Ancestors, HarperCollins, ISBN 0-04-570015-X
- Margulis, Lynn, and Dorion Sagan (1991). Mystery Dance: On the Evolution of Human Sexuality, Summit Books, ISBN 0-671-63341-4
- Margulis, Lynn, ed. (1991). Symbiosis as a Source of Evolutionary Innovation: Speciation and Morphogenesis, The MIT Press, ISBN 0-262-13269-9
- Margulis, Lynn (1991). "Symbiosis in Evolution: Origins of Cell Motility". In Osawa, Syozo; Honzo, Tasuku (eds.). Evolution of Life. Japan: Springer. pp. 305–324. doi:10.1007/978-4-431-68302-5_19. ISBN 978-4-431-68304-9.
- Margulis, Lynn (1992). Symbiosis in Cell Evolution: Microbial Communities in the Archean and Proterozoic Eons, W.H. Freeman, ISBN 0-7167-7028-8
- Sagan, Dorion, and Margulis, Lynn (1993). The Garden of Microbial Delights: A Practical Guide to the Subvisible World, Kendall/Hunt, ISBN 0-8403-8529-3
- Margulis, Lynn, Dorion Sagan and Niles Eldredge (1995) What Is Life?, Simon and Schuster, ISBN 978-0684810874
- Margulis, Lynn, and Dorion Sagan (1997). Slanted Truths: Essays on Gaia, Symbiosis, and Evolution, Copernicus Books, ISBN 0-387-94927-5
- Margulis, Lynn, and Dorion Sagan (1997). What Is Sex?, Simon and Schuster, ISBN 0-684-82691-7
- Margulis, Lynn, and Karlene V. Schwartz (1997). Five Kingdoms: An Illustrated Guide to the Phyla of Life on Earth, W.H. Freeman & Company, ISBN 0-613-92338-3
- Margulis, Lynn (1998). Symbiotic Planet: A New Look at Evolution, Basic Books, ISBN 0-465-07271-2
- Margulis, Lynn, et al. (2002). The Ice Chronicles: The Quest to Understand Global Climate Change, University of New Hampshire, ISBN 1-58465-062-1
- Margulis, Lynn, and Dorion Sagan (2002). Acquiring Genomes: A Theory of the Origins of Species, Perseus Books Group, ISBN 0-465-04391-7
- Margulis, Lynn (2007). Luminous Fish: Tales of Science and Love, Sciencewriters Books, ISBN 978-1-933392-33-2
- Margulis, Lynn, and Eduardo Punset, eds. (2007). Mind, Life and Universe: Conversations with Great Scientists of Our Time, Sciencewriters Books, ISBN 978-1-933392-61-5
- Margulis, Lynn, and Dorion Sagan (2007). Dazzle Gradually: Reflections on the Nature of Nature, Sciencewriters Books, ISBN 978-1-933392-31-8

=== Journals ===
- Margulis (Sagan), Lynn (1967). "On the Origin of Mitosing Cells". Journal of Theoretical Biology. 14 (3): 225–274. Bibcode:1967JThBi..14..225S. doi:10.1016/0022-5193(67)90079-3. PMID 11541392.
- Margulis, Lynn (1976). "Genetic and evolutionary consequences of symbiosis". Experimental Parasitology. 39 (2): 277–349. doi:10.1016/0014-4894(76)90127-2. PMID 816668.
- Margulis, Lynn (1980). "Undulipodia, flagella and cilia". Biosystems. 12 (1–2): 105–108. Bibcode:1980BiSys..12..105M. doi:10.1016/0303-2647(80)90041-6. PMID 7378551.
- Margulis, Lynn; Bermudes, D. (1985). "Symbiosis as a mechanism of evolution: status of cell symbiosis theory". Symbiosis. 1: 101–124. PMID 11543608.
- Sagan, D.; Margulis, Lynn (1987). "Gaia and the evolution of machines". Whole Earth Review. 55: 15–21. PMID 11542102.
- Bermudes, D.; Margulis, Lynn; Tzertzinis, G (1987). "Prokaryotic origin of undulipodia. Application of the panda principle to the centriole enigma". Annals of the New York Academy of Sciences. 503 (1): 187–197. Bibcode:1987NYASA.503..187B. doi:10.1111/j.1749-6632.1987.tb40608.x. PMID 3304075. S2CID 39709909.
- Lazcano, A.; Guerrero, R.; Margulis, L; Oró, J (1988). "The evolutionary transition from RNA to DNA in early cells". Journal of Molecular Evolution. 27 (4): 283–290. Bibcode:1988JMolE..27..283L. doi:10.1007/bf02101189. PMID 2464698. S2CID 21008416.
- Margulis, Lynn (1990). "Words as battle cries—symbiogenesis and the new field of endocytobiology". BioScience. 40 (9): 673–677. doi:10.2307/1311435. JSTOR 1311435. PMID 11541293.
- Margulis, Lynn (1996). "Archaeal-eubacterial mergers in the origin of Eukarya: phylogenetic classification of life". Proceedings of the National Academy of Sciences of the United States of America. 93 (3): 1071–1076. Bibcode:1996PNAS...93.1071M. doi:10.1073/pnas.93.3.1071. PMC 40032. PMID 8577716.
- Chapman, M. J.; Margulis, Lynn (1998). "Morphogenesis by symbiogenesis". International Microbiology. 1 (4): 319–26. PMID 10943381.
- Margulis, Lynn; Dolan, M. F.; Guerrero, R. (2000). "The chimeric eukaryote: Origin of the nucleus from the karyomastigont in amitochondriate protists". Proceedings of the National Academy of Sciences. 97 (13): 6954–6959. Bibcode:2000PNAS...97.6954M. doi:10.1073/pnas.97.13.6954. PMC 34369. PMID 10860956.
- Wier, A.; Dolan, M.; Grimaldi, D.; Guerrero, R.; Wagensberg, J.; Margulis, L. (2002). "Spirochete and protist symbionts of a termite (Mastotermes electrodominicus) in Miocene amber". Proceedings of the National Academy of Sciences. 99 (3): 1410–1413. Bibcode:2002PNAS...99.1410W. doi:10.1073/pnas.022643899. PMC 122204. PMID 11818534.
- Dolan, Michael F.; Melnitsky, Hannah; Margulis, Lynn; Kolnicki, Robin (2002). "Motility proteins and the origin of the nucleus". The Anatomical Record. 268 (3): 290–301. doi:10.1002/ar.10161. PMID 12382325. S2CID 7405778.
- Margulis, Lynn (2005). "Hans Ris (1914–2004). Genophore, chromosomes and the bacterial origin of chloroplasts". International Microbiology. 8 (2): 145–8. PMID 16052465.
- Margulis, Lynn; Chapman, M.; Guerrero, R.; Hall, J. (2006). "The last eukaryotic common ancestor (LECA): Acquisition of cytoskeletal motility from aerotolerant spirochetes in the Proterozoic Eon". Proceedings of the National Academy of Sciences. 103 (35): 13080–13085. Bibcode:2006PNAS..10313080M. doi:10.1073/pnas.0604985103. PMC 1559756. PMID 16938841.
- Dolan, MF; Margulis, L (2007). "Advances in biology reveal truth about prokaryotes". Nature. 445 (7123): 21. Bibcode:2007Natur.445...21D. doi:10.1038/445021b. PMID 17203039. S2CID 4426413.
- Margulis, Lynn; Chapman, Michael; Dolan, Michael F. (2007). "Semes for analysis of evolution: de Duve's peroxisomes and Meyer's hydrogenases in the sulphurous Proterozoic eon". Nature Reviews Genetics. 8 (10): 1. doi:10.1038/nrg2071-c1. PMID 17923858. S2CID 33808568.
- Brorson, O.; Brorson, S.-H.; Scythes, J.; MacAllister, J.; Wier, A.; Margulis, L. (2009). "Destruction of spirochete Borrelia burgdorferi round-body propagules (RBs) by the antibiotic Tigecycline". Proceedings of the National Academy of Sciences. 106 (44): 18656–18661. Bibcode:2009PNAS..10618656B. doi:10.1073/pnas.0908236106. PMC 2774030. PMID 19843691.
- Wier, AM; Sacchi, L; Dolan, MF; Bandi, C; Macallister, J; Margulis, L (2010). "Spirochete attachment ultrastructure: Implications for the origin and evolution of cilia". The Biological Bulletin. 218 (1): 25–35. doi:10.1086/BBLv218n1p25. PMID 20203251. S2CID 21634272.
- Guerrero, R; Margulis, L; Berlanga, M; Bandi, C; Macallister, J; Margulis, L (2013). "Symbiogenesis: the holobiont as a unit of evolution". International Microbiology. 16 (3): 133–143. doi:10.2436/20.1501.01.188. PMID 24568029.
