= Karl Friedrich Schimper =

German botanist, naturalist and poet (1803–1867)

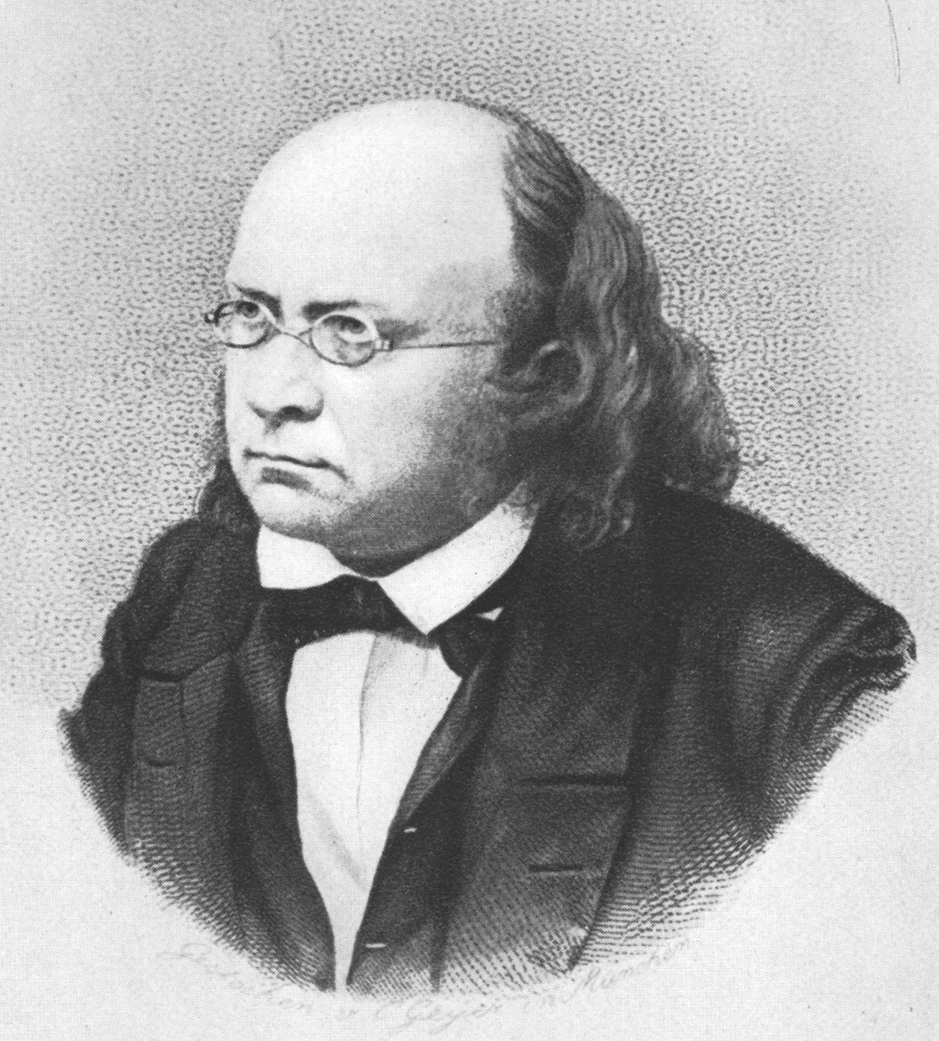
- Born: February 15, 1803; Mannheim, Germany
- Died: 21 December 1867 (aged 64); Schwetzingen, Germany
- Occupations: Botanist; naturalist; poet

Karl Friedrich Schimper (15 February 1803 – 21 December 1867) was a German botanist, naturalist and poet.

== Life ==
=== Early life and education ===
Schimper was born in Mannheim, on February 15, 1803, to Friedrich Ludwig Heinrich Schimper and Margaretha Kathar. Jakob. Wilh. V. Furtenbach. He was a theology student at Heidelberg University and taught at the Ludwig-Maximilians-Universität München.

=== Career ===
Schimper pioneered research in the field of plant morphology, particularly phyllotaxis. He is perhaps best known as the originator of the theory of prehistoric hot and cold eras, and was one of the initiators of the modern theories of ice ages and climatic cycles. He was a brother of botanist Georg Wilhelm Schimper and cousin of botanist Wilhelm Philippe Schimper.

Bill Bryson states in his book A Short History of Nearly Everything that Karl Schimper originated the idea of glaciation and proposed the radical idea that ice sheets had once covered much of Europe, Asia, and North America. However, Schimper was known to be reluctant to write and never published his ideas. He discussed them with Louis Agassiz, who went on to appropriate the idea as his own and, much to Schimper's dismay, undeservedly received much of the credit for its origination.

=== Death ===
Schimper died on December 21, 1867, in Schwetzingen.

== Works ==
- Beschreibung des Symphytum Zeyheri und seiner zwei deutschen verwandten der S. bulbosum Schimper und S. tuberosum Jacq : mit 6 Steintaf. . Winter, Heidelberg 1835 Digital edition by the University and State Library Düsseldorf
