= Georg Wilhelm Schimper =

German botanist (1804–1878)

Georg Heinrich Wilhelm Schimper, in Amharic sources known as Sambar (Note: Amharized version of his last name Schimper) (2 August 1804 – October 1878), was a German botanist and naturalist who spent more than forty years in Ethiopia collecting specimens of plants, mainly in Semien, the Tekeze area and around Adwa. Schimper discovered more new African plant species than possibly any other botanist, and numerous plant species bear the epithet Schimperi/Schimperiana.

== Biography ==
Schimper was born at Lauf an der Pegnitz in Bavaria. He was the son of Margaretha Baroness von Furthenbach and the engineer and teacher Friedrich Ludwig Heinrich Schimper. He was a brother to naturalist Karl Friedrich Schimper (1803–1867).

From 1828 to 1830 Schimper studied natural history in Munich and entered into contact with Eduard Rüppell, and for a short period of time worked with geologist Louis Agassiz as a draftsman and illustrator. In 1831 he undertook a botanical collection trip to Algiers, about which, he published Reise nach Algier in den jahren 1831 und 1832. A few years later he conducted botanical research in Egypt and the Sinai, eventually settling in Ethiopia in 1836.

During his time spent in Ethiopia, he had residences in Tigray and Semien provinces. For a period of time he was governor of Enticho, a district in Tigray, under the rule of Dejazmach Wube Haile Maryam, who had him marry Mirritsit, a woman from a prominent family in Adwa, who bore him several children. Although he was imprisoned at Magdala by Emperor Tewodros II, otherwise he suffered no serious losses during that unsettled time. While in Ethiopia, he maintained correspondence with botanists in Europe, and made valuable contributions to natural history collections in Paris and Berlin. He was also a collector for Unio Itineraria (Der Esslinger Botanische Reiseverein) in Württemberg. and distributed several exsiccata-like specimen series, examples being Unio itineraria 1832 and Schimperi iter Abyssinicum. Sectio prima: plantae Adoёnses. After 1842 Rudolph Friedrich Hohenacker distributed material collected by Schimper under various titles, an example being Plantarum Arabiae Petraeae imprimis montis Sinai species ... collectas a Guillmo Schimper nominibus a Prof. Ch. F. Hochstetter recognitis secunda vice edidit R. F. Hohenacker. 1843.

During the years 1864 to 1868 he wrote an extensive report on his observations made in the course of his botanical trips through Tigray in northern Ethiopia. The manuscripts came to the British Museum in 1870 and are now kept in the British Library. They are available online in the public domain.

Schimper died at Adwa in Tigray, Ethiopia .

== Taxa and Botanical Legacy ==
His name is commemorated by the botanical genera Schimpera (family Brassicaceae), Schimperella (now a synonym of Oreoschimperella Rauschert) and Schimperina (now a synonym of Agelanthus Tiegh.).

The species epithet schimperiana is attached to a number of plants; a few examples being Habenaria schimperiana, Pyrrosia schimperiana (now a synonym of Hovenkampia schimperiana,), Festuca schimperiana and Kalanchoe schimperiana.

Specimens collected by Schimper are cared for at multiple institutions, including the National Museum of Natural History, France, Plantentuin Meise, Botanische Staatssammlung München and the National Herbarium of Victoria (MEL), Royal Botanic Gardens Victoria.

== Notes ==
- "This article incorporates translated text from an equivalent article at the German Wikipedia".

== Relevant literature ==
- McEwan, Dorothea. "Georg Wilhelm Schimper (1804-1878). Maps and cross-sectional profiles of Tigray, the Semen Mountains and the Märäb and Täkkäze regions of Ethiopa". Journal of the International Map Collectors’ Society ( IMCoS), London, June 2020 edition, 7-17. ISSN 0956-5728.
