= Stromule =

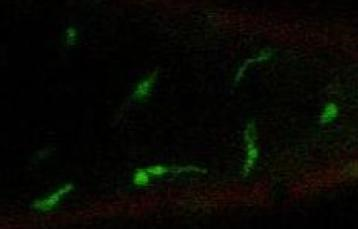
Plastids in an onion epidermal cell transformed with GFP and a plastidic targeting peptide, stromules are visible

A stromule is a microscopic tubular process extending from plastids in plant cells. Stromules (stroma-filled tubules) are highly dynamic structures extending from the surface of all plastid types, including proplastids, chloroplasts, etioplasts, leucoplasts, amyloplasts, and chromoplasts. Protrusions from and interconnections between plastids were observed in 1888 (Gottlieb Haberlandt) and 1908 (Gustav Senn) and have been described sporadically in the literature since then. Stromules were recently rediscovered in 1997 and have since been reported to exist in a number of angiosperm species including Arabidopsis thaliana, wheat, rice and tomato, but their role is not yet fully understood.

This highly dynamic nature is caused by the close relationship between plastid stromules and actin microfilaments, which are anchored to the stromule extensions, either in a longitudinal fashion to pull from the stromule and guide the plastid in a given direction or in a hinge fashion allowing the plastid to rest anchored in a given place. The actin microfilaments also define the stromule shape through their interactions. This dynamic random walk-like movement is probably caused by Myosin XI proteins as a recent work found.

Other organelles are also associated to stromules, as mitochondria, which have been observed associated and sliding over stromule tubes. Plastids and mitochondria need to be spatially close as some metabolic pathways like photorespiration require the association of both organelles to recycle glycolate and detoxify the ammonium produced during photorespiration.

== Structure ==
Stromules are usually 0.35–0.85 μm in diameter and of variable length, from short beak-like projections to linear or branched structures up to 220 μm long. They are enclosed by the inner and outer plastid envelope membranes and enable the transfer of molecules as large as RuBisCO (~560 kDa) between interconnected plastids. Stromules occur in all plant cell types, but stromule morphology and the proportion of plastids with stromules vary from tissue to tissue and at different stages of plant development. In general, smaller plastids produce shorter stromules, although the largest plastids, mesophyll chloroplasts produce relatively short stromules, indicating that other factors control stromule formation. In general, stromules are more abundant in cells containing non-green plastids, and in cells containing smaller plastids.

== Function ==
The primary function of stromules is still unresolved, although the presence of stromules markedly increases the plastid surface area, potentially increasing transport to and from the cytosol. Other functions of stromules, such as transfer of macromolecules between plastids and starch granule formation in cereal endosperm, may be restricted to particular tissues and cell types.

== See also ==
- Membrane nanotube

== Sources ==
- A Novel View of Chloroplast Structure a good introduction on stromules, with nice fluorescence pictures of chloroplasts and stromules.
- Natesan SK, Sullivan JA, Gray JC (March 2005). "Stromules: a characteristic cell-specific feature of plastid morphology". J. Exp. Bot. 56 (413): 787–97. doi:10.1093/jxb/eri088. PMID 15699062.: A good review on stromules (unfortunately access is restricted to subscribers)
