= Proteinoplast =

Organelles in plant cells

Different plastids

Proteinoplasts (sometimes called proteoplasts, aleuroplasts, and aleuronaplasts) are specialized organelles found only in plant cells. Proteinoplasts belong to a broad category of organelles known as plastids. Plastids are specialized double-membrane organelles found in plant cells. Plastids perform a variety of functions such as metabolism of energy, and biological reactions. There are multiple types of plastids recognized including Leucoplasts, Chromoplasts, and Chloroplasts. Plastids are broken up into different categories based on characteristics such as size, function and physical traits. Chromoplasts help to synthesize and store large amounts of carotenoids. Chloroplasts are photosynthesizing structures that help to make light energy for the plant. Leucoplasts are a colorless type of plastid which means that no photosynthesis occurs here. The colorless pigmentation of the leucoplast is due to not containing the structural components of thylakoids unlike what is found in chloroplasts and chromoplasts that gives them their pigmentation. From leucoplasts stems the subtype, proteinoplasts, which contain proteins for storage. They contain crystalline bodies of protein and can be the sites of enzyme activity involving those proteins. Proteinoplasts are found in many seeds, such as brazil nuts, peanuts and pulses. Although all plastids contain high concentrations of protein, proteinoplasts were identified in the 1960s and 1970s as having large protein inclusions that are visible with both light microscopes and electron microscopes. In 1967, American biologist Dr. E.H. Newcomb published an article discussing the structure of a plastid that was present in bean plants. Markedly, Newcomb's paper was one of the first to characterize proteinoplasts by their structure; the plastids observed contained large, crystalline protein bodies and ribosomes that were bound by a membrane. Other subtypes of Leucoplasts include amyloplast, and elaioplasts. Amyloplasts help to store and synthesize starch molecules found in plants, while elaioplasts synthesize and store lipids in plant cells.

== See also ==
- Chloroplast and etioplast
- Chromoplast
- Leucoplast
  - Amyloplast
  - Elaioplast
