= Tannosome =

Plant organelle that stores and modifies tannins

Tannosomes are organelles found in plant cells of vascular plants.

== Formation and functions ==
Tannosomes are formed when the chloroplast membrane forms pockets filled with tannin. Slowly, the pockets break off as tiny vacuoles that carry tannins to the large vacuole filled with acidic fluid. Tannins are then released into the vacuole and stored inside as tannin accretions.

They are responsible for synthesizing and producing condensed tannins and polyphenols. Tannosomes condense tannins in chlorophyllous organs, providing defenses against herbivores and pathogens, and protection against UV radiation.

== Discovery ==
Tannosomes were discovered in September 2013 by French and Hungarian researchers.

The discovery of tannosomes showed how to get enough tannins to change the flavour of wine, tea, chocolate, and other food or snacks.

== See also ==
- Chloroplast
- Leucoplast
- Plastid
