= Etioplast =

Intermediate type of plastid

Different types of plastid

Etioplasts are an intermediate type of plastid that develop from proplastids that have not been exposed to light, and convert into chloroplasts upon exposure to light. They are usually found in stem and leaf tissue of flowering plants (Angiosperms) grown either in complete darkness, or in extremely low-light conditions.

== Etymology ==
The word "etiolated" (from French word étioler — "straw") was first coined by Erasmus Darwin in 1791 to describe the white and straw-like appearance of dark-grown plants. However, the term "etioplast" did not exist until 1967 when it was invented by John T. O. Kirk and Richard A. E. Tilney-Bassett to distinguish etioplasts from proplastids, their precursors.

== Structure ==
Etioplasts are characterized by the absence of chlorophyll and the presence of a complicated structure called a prolamellar body (PLB). Usually, a single one is present in each etioplast. PLB is composed of symmetrically arranged, tetrahedrally-branched tubules and may contain ribosomes and plastoglobules inside. The latter are rich with carotenoids, especially lutein and violaxanthin, which may help in transition to chloroplasts. Due to the higher presence of carotenoids than protochlorophyllide, etiolated leaves appear pale yellow instead of just white.

== Transition to chloroplast ==
Every PLB contains protochlorophyllide which is rapidly converted into chlorophyllide by the enzyme protochlorophyllide reductase upon exposure to light. Following this, chlorophyllide is converted to chlorophyll through enzymatic processes. This is stimulated by plant growth hormones: cytokinins and gibberellins. The structure of PLB itself is almost immediately disrupted, and thylakoid and grana development is started in reaction to light: photosystem I activates within 15 minutes, photosystem II within 2 hours, and after approximately 3 hours an etioplast is completely converted into a functional chloroplast.

The transitional stage between an etioplast and a chloroplast which still contains small PLBs interconnected with developing thylakoids, but already has chlorophyll is sometimes called an "etio-chloroplast". Etioplasts were once thought to be laboratory artefacts not found in nature, but that has since been disproven: in cabbage heads, developing inner leaves contain etioplasts due to being shaded by outer leaves; seedlings that naturally germinate underground may also contain etioplasts.

== See also ==
- Plastid
  - Chloroplast
  - Chromoplast
  - Leucoplast
    - Amyloplast
    - Elaioplast
    - Proteinoplast
  - Gerontoplast
