= Leucoplast =

Organelles found in plant cells

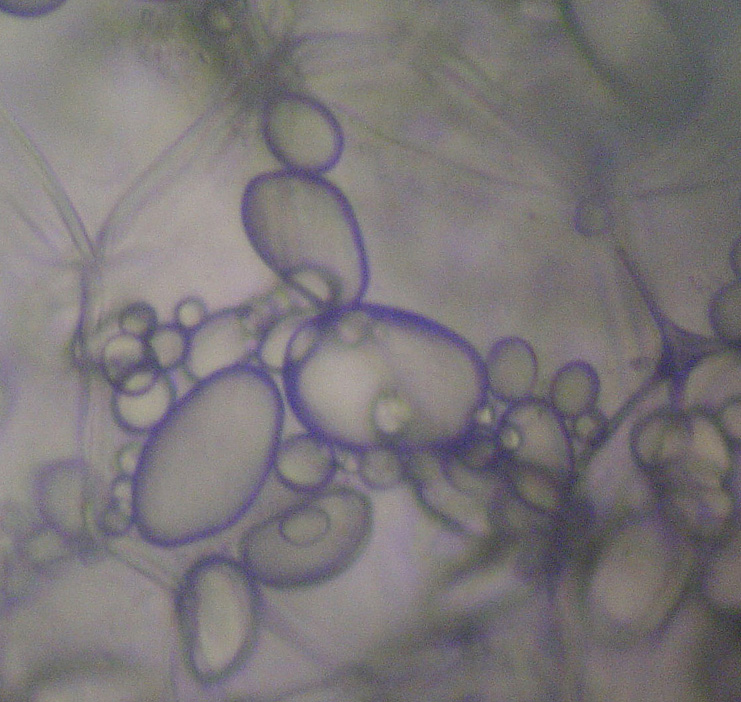
Leucoplasts, specifically, amyloplasts

Leucoplasts ("formed, molded") are a category of plastid and as such are organelles found in plant cells. They are non-pigmented, in contrast to other plastids such as the chloroplast.

== Background ==
Lacking photosynthetic pigments, leucoplasts are located in non-photosynthetic tissues of plants, such as roots, bulbs and seeds. They may be specialized for bulk storage of starch, lipid or protein and are then known as amyloplasts, elaioplasts, or proteinoplasts (also called aleuroplasts) respectively. However, in many cell types, leucoplasts do not have a major storage function and are present to provide a wide range of essential biosynthetic functions, including the synthesis of fatty acids such as palmitic acid, many amino acids, and tetrapyrrole compounds such as heme. In general, leucoplasts are much smaller than chloroplasts and have a variable morphology, often described as amoeboid. Extensive networks of stromules interconnecting leucoplasts have been observed in epidermal cells of roots, hypocotyls, and petals, and in callus and suspension culture cells of tobacco. In some cell types at certain stages of development, leucoplasts are clustered around the nucleus with stromules extending to the cell periphery, as observed for proplastids in the root meristem.

=== Etioplasts ===
Pre-granal etioplasts, which are chloroplasts that have not matured but can be chloroplasts deprived of light, lack the active pigment. They can thereby can be considered leucoplasts. After several minutes exposure to light, etioplasts transform into functioning chloroplasts and cease being leucoplasts. Amyloplasts are of large size and store starch.

Proteinoplasts store proteins and are found in seeds (pulses), while elaioplasts store fats and oils and are found in seeds. They are also called oleosomes.

== See also ==

- Plastid
  - Chloroplast and etioplast
  - Chromoplast
  - Tannosome
  - Leucoplast
    - Amyloplast
    - Elaioplast
    - Proteinoplast
