= Plant cell =

Type of eukaryotic cell present in green plants

Structure of a plant cell

Plant cells are the cells present in green plants, photosynthetic eukaryotes of the kingdom Plantae. Their distinctive features include primary cell walls containing cellulose, hemicelluloses and pectin, the presence of plastids with the capability to perform photosynthesis and store starch, a large vacuole that regulates turgor pressure, the absence of flagella or centrioles, except in the gametes, and a unique method of cell division involving the formation of a cell plate or phragmoplast that separates the new daughter cells.

== Structure ==
- Plant cells have cell walls composed of cellulose, hemicelluloses, and pectin and constructed outside the cell membrane. Their composition contrasts with the cell walls of fungi, which are made of chitin, of bacteria, which are made of peptidoglycan and of archaea, which are made of pseudopeptidoglycan. In many cases lignin or suberin are secreted by the protoplast as secondary wall layers inside the primary cell wall. Cutin is secreted outside the primary cell wall and into the outer layers of the secondary cell wall of the epidermal cells of leaves, stems and other above-ground organs to form the plant cuticle. Cell walls perform many essential functions. They provide shape to form the tissue and organs of the plant, and play an important role in intercellular communication and plant-microbe interactions. The cell wall is flexible during growth and has small pores called plasmodesmata that allow the exchange of nutrients and hormones between cells.
- Many types of plant cells contain a large central vacuole, a water-filled volume enclosed by a membrane known as the tonoplast that maintains the cell's turgor, controls movement of molecules between the cytosol and sap, stores useful material such as phosphorus and nitrogen and digests waste proteins and organelles.
- Specialized cell-to-cell communication pathways known as plasmodesmata, occur in the form of pores in the primary cell wall through which the cell membrane and endoplasmic reticulum of adjacent cells are continuous.
- Plant cells contain plastids, the most notable being chloroplasts, which contain the green-colored pigment chlorophyll that converts the energy of sunlight into chemical energy that the plant uses to make its own food from water and carbon dioxide in the process known as photosynthesis. Other types of plastids are the amyloplasts, specialized for starch storage, elaioplasts specialized for fat storage, and chromoplasts specialized for synthesis and storage of pigments. As in mitochondria, which have a genome encoding 37 genes, plastids have their own genomes of about 100–120 unique genes and are interpreted as having arisen as prokaryotic endosymbionts living in the cells of an early eukaryotic ancestor of the land plants and algae.
- Cell division in land plants and a few groups of algae, notably the charophytes and the chlorophyte order Trentepohliales, takes place by construction of a phragmoplast as a template for building a cell plate late in cytokinesis.
- The motile, free-swimming sperm of bryophytes and pteridophytes, cycads and Ginkgo are the only cells of land plants to have flagella similar to those in animal cells. The conifers and flowering plants do not have motile sperm and lack both flagella and centrioles.

== Types of plant cells and tissues ==
Plant cells differentiate from undifferentiated meristematic cells (analogous to the stem cells of animals) to form the major classes of cells and tissues of roots, stems, leaves, flowers, and reproductive structures, each of which may be composed of several cell types.

=== Parenchyma ===
Parenchyma cells are living cells that have functions ranging from storage and support to photosynthesis (mesophyll cells) and phloem loading (transfer cells). Apart from the xylem and phloem in their vascular bundles, leaves are composed mainly of parenchyma cells. Some parenchyma cells, as in the epidermis, are specialized for light penetration and focusing or regulation of gas exchange, but others are among the least specialized cells in plant tissue, and may remain totipotent, capable of dividing to produce new populations of undifferentiated cells, throughout their lives. Parenchyma cells have thin, permeable primary walls enabling the transport of small molecules between them, and their cytoplasm is responsible for a wide range of biochemical functions such as nectar secretion, or the manufacture of secondary products that discourage herbivory. Parenchyma cells that contain many chloroplasts and are concerned primarily with photosynthesis are called chlorenchyma cells. Chlorenchyma cells are parenchyma cells involved in photosynthesis. Others, such as the majority of the parenchyma cells in potato tubers and the seed cotyledons of legumes, have a storage function.

=== Collenchyma ===
Collenchyma cells are alive at maturity and have thickened cellulose cell walls. These cells mature from meristem derivatives that initially resemble parenchyma, but differences quickly become apparent. Plastids do not develop, and the secretory apparatus (ER and Golgi) proliferates to secrete additional primary wall. The wall is most commonly thickest at the corners, where three or more cells come in contact, and thinnest where only two cells come in contact, though other arrangements of the wall thickening are possible. Pectin and hemicellulose are the dominant constituents of collenchyma cell walls of dicotyledon angiosperms, which may contain as little as 20% of cellulose in Petasites. Collenchyma cells are typically quite elongated, and may divide transversely to give a septate appearance. The role of this cell type is to support the plant in axes still growing in length, and to confer flexibility and tensile strength on tissues. The primary wall lacks lignin that would make it tough and rigid, so this cell type provides what could be called plastic support – support that can hold a young stem or petiole into the air, but in cells that can be stretched as the cells around them elongate. Stretchable support (without elastic snap-back) is a good way to describe what collenchyma does. Parts of the strings in celery are collenchyma.

Cross section of a leaf showing various plant cell types

=== Sclerenchyma ===
Sclerenchyma is a tissue composed of two types of cells, sclereids and fibres that have thickened, lignified secondary walls laid down inside of the primary cell wall. The secondary walls harden the cells and make them impermeable to water. Consequently, sclereids and fibres are typically dead at functional maturity, and the cytoplasm is missing, leaving an empty central cavity. Sclereids or stone cells, (from the Greek skleros, hard) are hard, tough cells that give leaves or fruits a gritty texture. They may discourage herbivory by damaging digestive passages in small insect larval stages. Sclereids form the hard pit wall of peaches and many other fruits, providing physical protection to the developing kernel. Fibres are elongated cells with lignified secondary walls that provide load-bearing support and tensile strength to the leaves and stems of herbaceous plants. Sclerenchyma fibres are not involved in conduction, either of water and nutrients (as in the xylem) or of carbon compounds (as in the phloem), but it is likely that they evolved as modifications of xylem and phloem initials in early land plants.

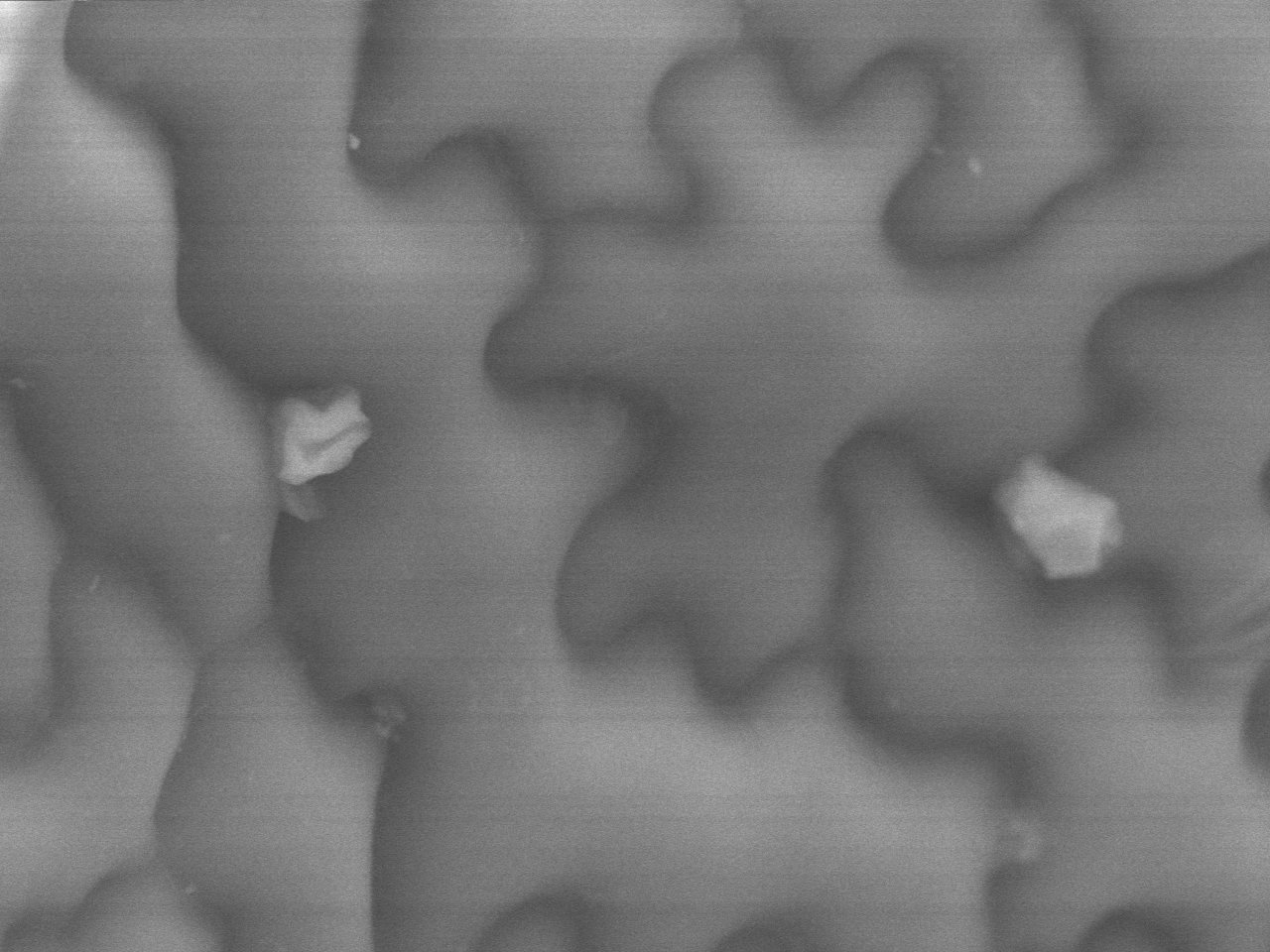
cells of Arabidopsis thaliana epidermis

=== Xylem ===
Xylem is a complex vascular tissue composed of water-conducting tracheids or vessel elements, together with fibres and parenchyma cells. Tracheids are elongated cells with lignified secondary thickening of the cell walls, specialised for conduction of water, and first appeared in plants during their transition to land in the Silurian period more than 425 million years ago (see Cooksonia). The possession of xylem tracheids defines the vascular plants or Tracheophytes. Tracheids are pointed, elongated xylem cells, the simplest of which have continuous primary cell walls and lignified secondary wall thickenings in the form of rings, hoops, or reticulate networks. More complex tracheids with valve-like perforations called bordered pits characterise the gymnosperms. The ferns and other pteridophytes and the gymnosperms have only xylem tracheids, while the flowering plants also have xylem vessels. Vessel elements are hollow xylem cells without end walls that are aligned end-to-end so as to form long continuous tubes. The bryophytes lack true xylem tissue, but their sporophytes have a water-conducting tissue known as the hydrome that is composed of elongated cells of simpler construction.

=== Phloem ===
Phloem is a specialised tissue for food transport in higher plants, mainly transporting sucrose along pressure gradients generated by osmosis, a process called translocation. Phloem is a complex tissue, consisting of two main cell types, the sieve tubes and the intimately associated companion cells, together with parenchyma cells, phloem fibres and sclereids. Sieve tubes are joined end-to-end with perforated end-plates between known as sieve plates, which allow transport of photosynthate between the sieve elements. The sieve tube elements lack nuclei and ribosomes, and their metabolism and functions are regulated by the adjacent nucleate companion cells. The companion cells, connected to the sieve tubes via plasmodesmata, are responsible for loading the phloem with sugars. The bryophytes lack phloem, but moss sporophytes have a simpler tissue with analogous function known as the leptome.

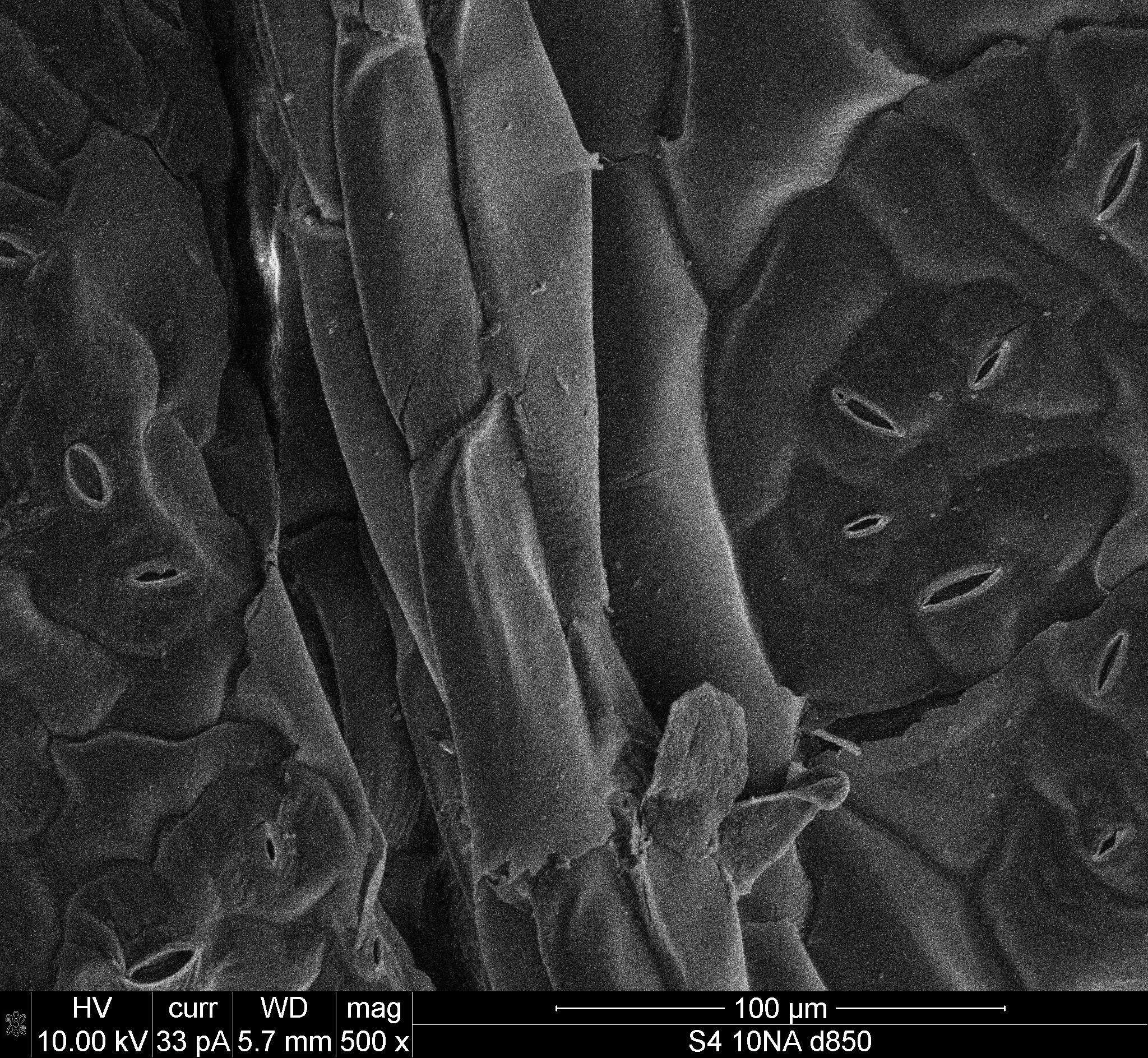
This is an electron micrograph of the epidermal cells of a Brassica chinensis leaf. The stomates are also visible.

=== Epidermis ===
The plant epidermis is specialised tissue, composed of parenchyma cells, that covers the external surfaces of leaves, stems and roots. Several cell types may be present in the epidermis. Notable among these are the stomatal guard cells that control the rate of gas exchange between the plant and the atmosphere, glandular and clothing hairs or trichomes, and the root hairs of primary roots. In the shoot epidermis of most plants, only the guard cells—a part of the stoma—have chloroplasts. Chloroplasts contain the green pigment chlorophyll which is needed for photosynthesis. The epidermal cells of aerial organs arise from the superficial layer of cells known as the tunica (L1 and L2 layers) that covers the plant shoot apex, whereas the cortex and vascular tissues arise from innermost layer of the shoot apex known as the corpus (L3 layer). The epidermis of roots originates from the layer of cells immediately beneath the root cap. The epidermis of all aerial organs, but not roots, is covered with a cuticle made of polyester cutin or polymer cutan (or both), with a superficial layer of epicuticular waxes. The epidermal cells of the primary shoot are thought to be the only plant cells with the biochemical capacity to synthesize cutin.

== See also ==
- Chromatin
- Cytoskeleton
- Leucoplast
- Nuclear envelope
- Nucleolus
- Paul Nurse
- Stromule
- Wall-associated kinase
