= Elaioplast =

Part of a plant

The differentiation of Elaioplasts

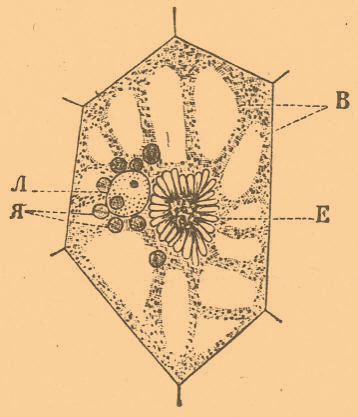
Illustration from Collegiate Dictionary, FA Brockhaus and IA Efron, circa 1905. Cell of very young leaf of Vanilla planifolia; E - elaioplasts; Л - the nucleus; Я - leucoplasts; B - vacuoles

Elaioplasts are one of the three possible forms of leucoplasts, sometimes broadly referred to as such. The main function of elaioplasts is synthesis and storage of fatty acids, terpenes, and other lipids, and they can be found in the embryonic leaves of certain plants, as well as the anthers of many flowering plants.

== Description ==
Like most leucoplasts, elaioplasts are non-pigmented organelles capable of alternating between the different forms of plastids. The elaioplast specifically is primarily responsible for the storage and metabolism of lipids, among these roles, recent studies have shown that these organelles participate in the formation of terpenes and fatty acids. Typically, they appear as small, rounded organelles filled by oil droplets. Lipids found inside elaioplasts mirror those synthesized by prokaryotes, chiefly triacylglycerol and sterol esters, which cluster into the droplets visible by microscope. As for their other components, elaioplasts also contain plastoglobuli associated proteins such as fibrillins, a protein family believed to be retained from the cyanobacterial ancestors of plastids. Alongside the tapetosomes (clusters of oil and proteins produced by the endoplasmic reticulum), elaioplasts are frequently found in the tapetum of angiosperm anthers, where their products, oil from the plastid and protein from the tapetosome, are used to form the pollen coat of developing grains. Following the maturation of pollen grains, these organelles are degraded and released into the anther loculus. Found also in oilseeds, elaioplasts in this group provide lipids to be converted into carbohydrates which will serve as fuel in the embryo's germination. Citrus specimens have been shown to have especially high amounts of elaioplasts in their fruit peels, where they are essential to the production of terpenes.

== Development ==
Within the plant, elaioplasts, as well as all other plastids, arise from proplastids in the dividing portion of the stem (meristem). These proplastids have not yet differentiated and, as such, can develop into any variety of known plastids, determined by the tissues they are present in. In vegetative cells, proplastids usually follow a unidirectional pathway of development with no reversals between one form and the next. Reproductive cells, however, may have plastids that inter-convert frequently. In the anthers of flowering plants, elaioplasts represent the final stage of plastid development within the tapetum, either emerging directly from proplastids or the conversion of other plastids, depending on the species and pollination strategy.

== Origin and inheritance ==
Plastids are hypothesized to have originated with an endosymbiotic event between an ancient eukaryote and cyanobacterial ancestor more than 1 billion years ago, where the bacteria was engulfed by the other and retained where it served as the metabolic center for photosynthesis. Evidence of this can be observed today in the independent genomes characteristic of plastids, found to be closely related to modern cyanobacteria. Since their ancient symbiotic event, the plastid genome has been reduced significantly, with the organelles themselves coding for around 100 of the 2500 associated proteins, everything else being transferred to the nuclear genome.

Like most plastids, elaioplasts reproduce through binary fission independent from the division of the parent cell, a feature indicative of their bacterial ancestry. This fission occurs just before cytokinesis, with the products then being transported to the daughter cells as a component of the cytoplasm.

As a result of the ability to inter-convert between other types of the plastid family, elaioplasts share the same plastome(plastid genome) with all other plastids and are predominately inherited maternally in angiosperms. As its name implies, maternal inheritance excludes the plastome of the father through one of two ways: during pollen development or in pollen tube formation. During pollen development, paternal plastids are halted by microfilaments in the cytoskeleton just prior to microspore division or degeneration just after. Paternal plastome contribution can also be prevented during pollen tube formation, where the plastids are separated from sperm cells as they fuse with the egg.

== See also ==
- Plastid
  - Chloroplast and etioplast
  - Chromoplast
  - Leucoplast
    - Amyloplast
    - Proteinoplast
