= Amyloplast =

Type of plastid, double-enveloped organelles in plant cells

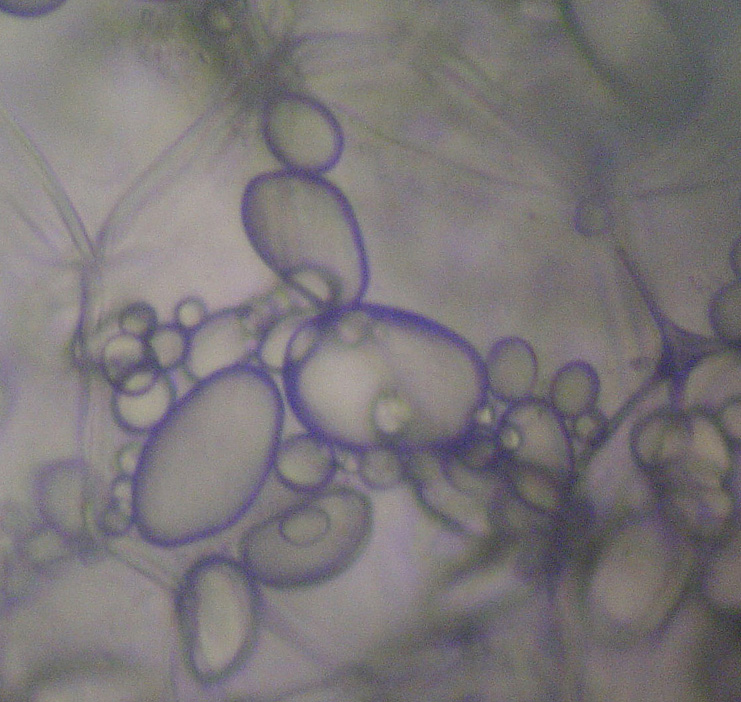
Amyloplasts in a potato cell

Amyloplasts are a type of plastid, double-enveloped organelles in plant cells that are involved in various biological pathways. Amyloplasts are specifically a type of leucoplast, a subcategory for colorless, non-pigment-containing plastids. Amyloplasts are found in roots and storage tissues, and they store and synthesize starch for the plant through the polymerization of glucose. Starch synthesis relies on the transportation of carbon from the cytosol, the mechanism by which is currently under debate.

Starch synthesis and storage also takes place in chloroplasts, a type of pigmented plastid involved in photosynthesis. Amyloplasts and chloroplasts are closely related, and amyloplasts can turn into chloroplasts; this is for instance observed when potato tubers are exposed to light and turn green.

== Role in gravity sensing ==
A diagram showing the different types of plastid

Amyloplasts are thought to play a vital role in gravitropism. Statoliths, a specialized starch-accumulating amyloplast, are denser than cytoplasm, and are able to settle to the bottom of the gravity-sensing cell, called a statocyte. This settling is a vital mechanism in plant's perception of gravity, triggering the asymmetrical distribution of auxin that causes the curvature and growth of stems against the gravity vector, as well as growth of roots along the gravity vector. A plant lacking in phosphoglucomutase, for example, is a starchless mutant plant, thus preventing the settling of the statoliths. This mutant shows a significantly weaker gravitropic response as compared to a non-mutant plant. A normal gravitropic response can be rescued with hypergravity. In roots, gravity is sensed in the root cap, a section of tissue at the very tip of the root. Upon removal of the root cap, the root loses its ability to sense gravity. However, if the root cap is regrown, the root's gravitropic response will recover. In stems, gravity is sensed in the endodermal cells of the shoots.
