= Roland Douce =

French plant botanist (1939–2018)

- Born: 18 May 1939; Saint-Maur-des-Fossés, Val de Marne
- Died: 4 November 2013 (aged 74); La Tronche, Isère
- Education: University of Paris
- Known for: Characterization of cardiolipin
- Awards: Silver medal of the CNRS; Member of the National Academy of Sciences; Légion d’Honneur, France
- Scientific career
- Fields: Plant biochemistry
- Workplaces: University of Paris;, Johnson Research Foundation, Philadelphia; University of California, San Diego; University of Grenoble
- Thesis: Structure, localization and metabolism of diphosphatidylglycerol, or cardiolipin, in plants (1961)

Roland Douce (18 May 1939, in Saint-Maur-des-Fossés, Val de Marne – 4 November 2018, in La Tronche, Isère) was a plant biologist and professor who, along with his students, created a world-renowned plant biology centre in Grenoble, France, focusing on the biology of chloroplasts and mitochondria and their roles in plant metabolism under normal or stressed physiological conditions.

== University degrees ==
He attained secondary education at the Marcelin Berthelot high school and the Arsonval college in Saint-Maur, and a baccalaureate in experimental sciences, in 1958. He had his graduate studies at the University of Paris, gaining a natural sciences degree in 1961. His PhD thesis at the University of Paris, in 1970 was titled "Structure, localization and metabolism of diphosphatidylglycerol, or cardiolipin, in plants" (1).

== Positions occupied ==
- Assistant, University of Paris, 1961,
- Master's assistant, University of Paris, 1965.
- Post Doctoral Fellow, 1970 to 1972, at the Johnson Research Foundation in Philadelphia (USA) in the group of Professor Walter D. Bonner Jr.
- Research Assistant, 1972 to 1973 at the Scripps Institution of Oceanography, University of California San Diego (USA) in the group of Professor Andrew A. Benson.
- Professor University of Grenoble, 1973–2004, Professor Emeritus after 2004.

== Administrative responsibilities ==
- Creator and head of the Laboratory of Cell and Plant Physiology, University of Grenoble, associated with CNRS, CEA and INRA until 1991.
- Scientific adviser at the CEA, 1979.
- Scientific adviser at Rhône-Poulenc-Agrochimie, 1982.
- Creator and head of the CNRS-Rhône-Poulenc-Agrochimie joint research unit, 1985–1997.
- Head of the Plant Physiology Department at INRA, 1985–1990.
- Director of research at the Ecole Normale Supérieure de Lyon, 1995–1998.
- Director of the Jean-Pierre Ebel Institute of Structural Biology in Grenoble, 2002–2005.

In addition to these responsibilities, he participated in numerous scientific committees, including the national committee of the CNRS

== Teaching activities ==
Roland Douce taught at all university levels. He was a senior member of the Institut Universitaire de France, 1992–2002.

== Publications ==
Author of nearly 250 scientific articles in international peer-reviewed journals and numerous journal articles and book chapters. Main journals: Biochemical Journal (35), Journal of Biological Chemistry (27), European Journal of Biochemistry (20), Proceedings of the National Academy of Sciences USA (12), Plant Physiology (50), Biochemistry (8), Biochimica Biophysica Acta (13), FEBS Letters (14), Archives of Biochemistry and Biophysics (13).

== Areas of expertise ==
Cell and whole plant physiology, specialising in chloroplasts and mitochondria, cell metabolism, especially energy metabolism, amino acid and vitamin biosynthesis. Biochemistry, molecular biology and structural biology. Botany and ornithology.

== Main discoveries ==
The first contribution of Roland Douce was the characterization of cardiolipin, the major lipid of the mitochondrial membrane of plants and animals, as phosphatidyl ethanolamine.

He then considerably improved the methods of purification of chloroplasts and mitochondria, and obtained the first envelope preparations. He was the first to show that the chloroplast shell is the site of biosynthesis of galactolipids and in particular MGDG, monogalactosyldiacylglycerol. With his team, he characterized the lipid and protein components of the envelope of the plastids. He succeeded in separating the inner and outer shells. This work paved the way for a detailed analysis of the chloroplast, its envelopes and functions. Several of the envelope protein genes were cloned, including the MGDG synthase gene.

Similar work was carried out on the mitochondria with the development of a purification method. It was thus be possible to carry out functional analysis, in particular of the proteins involved in photorespiration and the subunits of the glycine-decarboxylase complex. Chloroplasts and mitochondria are involved in the biosynthesis of several amino acids and vitamins. Roland Douce, in collaboration with industry, elucidated the biosynthesis pathways of several amino acids, and thus defined several potential targets for herbicide molecules. Similarly, he elucidated the biosynthesis pathways of biotin and tetrahydrofolic acid (vitamin B12).

The last part of Roland Douce's work deals with plant metabolism, under normal physiological conditions, or under conditions of stress (nutrient deficiency, light or heat stress). In this work, he greatly contributed to promoting the use of nuclear magnetic resonance in plant physiology.

Roland Douce was passionate about the mountains and he made a major contribution to renovating and developing the botanical garden of the Col du Lautaret, and to setting up a research laboratory there, associated with the University of Grenoble.

He was the author or coordinator of several books or reports on plant mitochondria, the plant world, transgenic plants, and hypotheses on the origin of life. He also coordinated two volumes of the Advances in Botanical Research series on vitamin biosynthesis.

Awards

- 1982: Silver medal from the National Centre for Scientific Research (CNRS)
- 1990: Correspondent of the Academie des Sciences, Paris
- 1992-2002: Senior member of the Institut Universitaire de France (IUF)
- 1996: Member of the Academie des Sciences, Paris, Integrative Biology Section
- 1995: Foreign Correspondent Award of the American Society of Plant Biologists (ASPB)
- 1997: Member of the National Academy of Sciences (USA)
- 2001: Elected Senior Scientist at Oxford University, United Kingdom.
- 2003: Officier of the Ordre national du Mérite
- 2009: Officier of the Légion d’Honneur, France
- 2009: Fellow of the American Society of Plant Biologists (ASPB)
- 2013: Lifetime Achievement Award for Photosynthesis of the Rebeiz Foundation, USA
- 2015: Commandeur of the Ordre national du Mérite, France

== Personal life ==
He was married with one daughter, Emmanuelle.
