= Inner membrane =

Inner membrane may refer to:

- Inner nuclear membrane
- Chloroplast inner membrane
- Inner mitochondrial membrane
- Plastid inner membrane
