= Galactolipid O-acyltransferase =

galactolipid O-acyltransferase

Identifiers
- EC no.: 2.3.1.134
- CAS no.: 103537-09-3

Databases
- IntEnz: IntEnz view
- BRENDA: BRENDA entry
- ExPASy: NiceZyme view
- KEGG: KEGG entry
- MetaCyc: metabolic pathway
- PRIAM: profile
- PDB structures: RCSB PDB PDBe PDBsum
- Gene Ontology: AmiGO / QuickGO
Search
- PMC: articles
- PubMed: articles
- NCBI: proteins

In enzymology, a galactolipid O-acyltransferase (EC 2.3.1.134) is an enzyme that catalyzes the chemical reaction

2 mono-beta-D-galactosyldiacylglycerol $\rightleftharpoons$ acylmono-beta-D-galactosyldiacylglycerol + mono-beta-D-galactosylacylglycerol

Hence, this enzyme has one substrate, mono-beta-D-galactosyldiacylglycerol, and two products, acylmono-beta-D-galactosyldiacylglycerol and mono-beta-D-galactosylacylglycerol.

This enzyme belongs to the family of transferases, specifically those acyltransferases transferring groups other than aminoacyl groups. The systematic name of this enzyme class is mono-beta-D-galactosyldiacylglycerol:mono-beta-D-galactosyldiacylgly cerol acyltransferase. This enzyme is also called galactolipid:galactolipid acyltransferase. This enzyme participates in glycerolipid metabolism.
