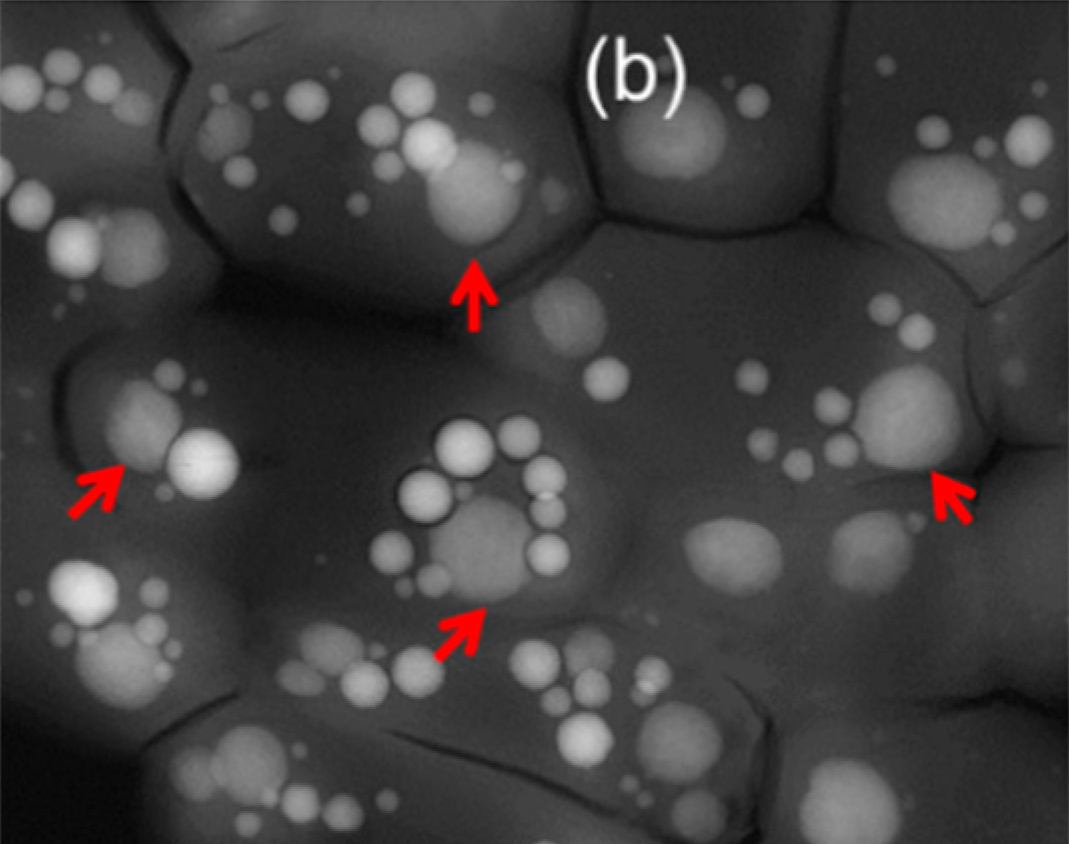
- Image of G. lithophora cells showing carbonate and polyphosphate inclusions taken using annular dark-field imaging (HAADF-STEM)

Scientific classification
- Domain: Bacteria
- Kingdom: Bacillati
- Phylum: Cyanobacteriota
- Class: Chroococcophyceae
- Order: Gloeomargaritales
- Family: Gloeomargaritaceae
- Genus: Gloeomargarita
- Species: G. lithophora

Binomial name
- Gloeomargarita lithophora Moreira et al. 2017

= Gloeomargarita lithophora =

Species of bacterium

Gloeomargarita lithophora, a cyanobacterium, is the first described member of the closest known present day relative lineage of all chloroplasts (except for the independently evolved in the amoeboid Paulinella chromatophora). The ancient relative of Gloeomargarita was engulfed by a eukaryotic host in an endosymbiotic event around 1900-1400 million years ago. The origin of plastids by endosymbiosis signifies the beginning of photosynthesis in eukaryotes, and as such their evolutionary relationship to Gloeomargarita lithophora, as the sister group, is of high importance to the evolutionary history of endosymbiotic organelles and photosynthesis.

== Description ==
Gloeomargarita lithophora was first identified in 2007 from microbialite samples taken from alkaline Lake Alchichica (Mexico). These samples were maintained in a lab aquarium and G. lithophora was isolated from biofilm that occurred within the aquarium. G. lithophora are gram-negative, unicellular rods capable of oxygenic photosynthesis and gliding motility. Their thylakoids are located peripherally and contains phycocyanin for light-harvesting complexes, and they use chlorophyll a as their photosynthetic pigment. Cells are 1.1 μm wide and 3.9 μm long on average. Growth occurred in both liquid and solid BG-11 growth media, as well as in alkaline water. Optimal growth temperature is 25 °C and optimal growth pH is 8–8.5.

== Bioremediation ==
Some evidence suggests that Gloeomargarita lithophora could serve as a biological buffer to treat water contaminated with strontium, barium, or radioactive pollutants such as radium. This could be a useful application of bioremediation.
