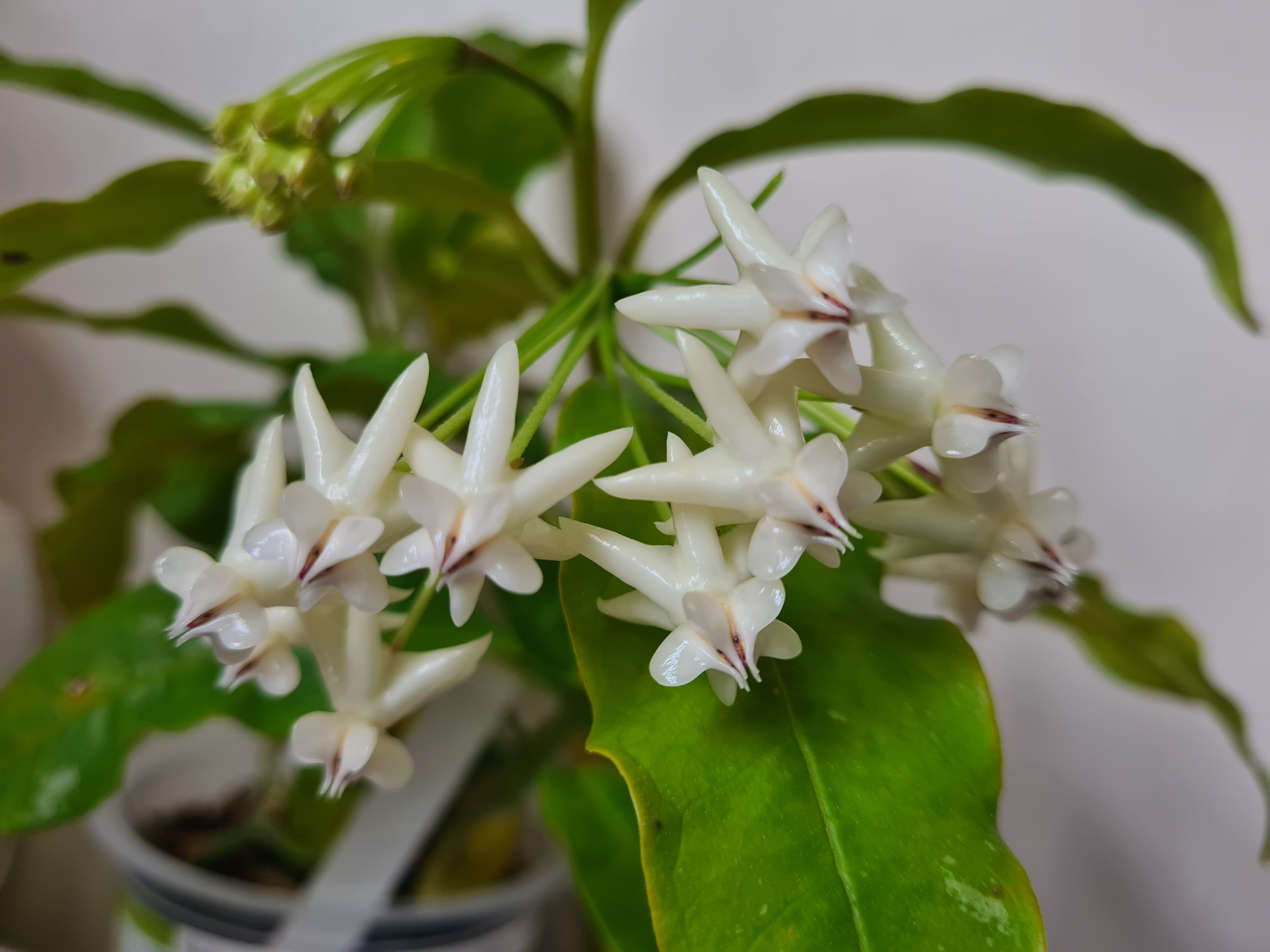
- As a houseplant

Scientific classification
- Kingdom: Plantae
- Clade: Tracheophytes
- Clade: Angiosperms
- Clade: Eudicots
- Clade: Asterids
- Order: Gentianales
- Family: Apocynaceae
- Genus: Hoya
- Species: H. lockii

Binomial name
- Hoya lockii V.T.Pham & Aver.

= Hoya lockii =

Species of plant

Hoya lockii is a species of flowering plant in the family Apocynaceae, native to Vietnam. An epiphyte, it is typically found in wet tropical areas. Its plastome sequence shows that it is closely related to Hoya exilis of New Guinea.
