= Hoya exilis =

Scientific classification
- Kingdom: Plantae
- Clade: Tracheophytes
- Clade: Angiosperms
- Clade: Eudicots
- Clade: Asterids
- Order: Gentianales
- Family: Apocynaceae
- Genus: Hoya
- Species: H. exilis

Binomial name
- Hoya exilis Schltr.

Species of plant

Hoya exilis is a species of flowering plant in the family Apocynaceae, native to New Guinea. It is typically found in wet tropical areas. Its plastome sequence shows that it is closely related to Hoya lockii of Vietnam.
