= Gerontoplast =

Plant cell organelle

A gerontoplast is a type of organelle known as a plastid, which develops from a chloroplast during the senescing of plant foliage. Gerontoplast development is generally seen to be the process of grana being unstacked, loss of thylakoid membranes, and large accumulation of plastoglobuli.

== Transformation of chloroplasts to gerontoplasts ==
The term gerontoplast was first introduced in 1977 to define the unique features of the plastid formed during leaf senescence. The process of senescence brings about regulated dismantling of cellular organelles involved in photosynthesis. Chloroplasts responsible for gas exchange in stomata are the last organelles to degrade during senescence, and give plants the green color. The formation of gerontoplasts from chloroplasts during senescence involves extensive structural modifications of the thylakoid membrane with the concomitant formation of a large number of plastoglobuli with lipophilic materials. The envelope of the plastid, however, remains intact.
