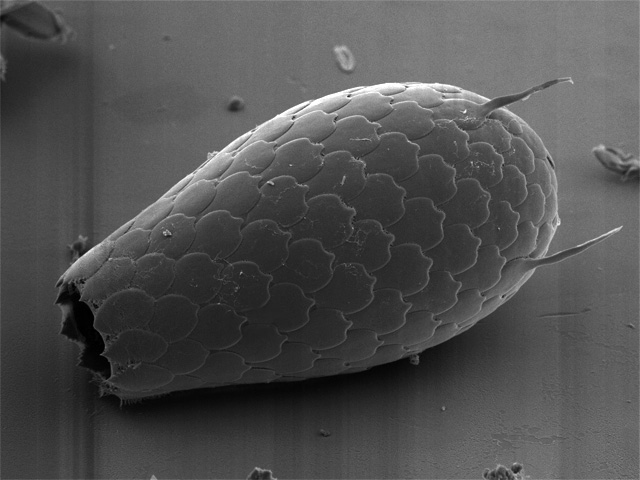
- Euglypha sp.

Scientific classification
- Domain: Eukaryota
- Clade: Sar
- Clade: Rhizaria
- Phylum: Cercozoa
- Class: Imbricatea
- Order: Euglyphida; Copeland, 1956

Families
- Assulinidae; Cyphoderiidae; Euglyphidae; Paulinellidae; Sphenoderiidae; Trinematidae

= Euglyphida =

Order of single-celled organisms

The euglyphids are a prominent group of filose amoebae that produce shells or tests that in most described species is reinforced by siliceous scales, plates, and sometimes spines, but this reinforcement is absent in other species.

These elements are created within the cell and then assembled on its surface in a more or less regular arrangement, giving the test a textured appearance. There is a single opening for the long slender pseudopods, which capture food and pull the cell across the substrate.

Euglyphids are common in soils, marshes, and other organic-rich environments, feeding on tiny organisms such as bacteria. The test is generally 30–100 μm in length, although the cell only occupies part of this space. During reproduction a second shell is formed opposite the opening, so both daughter cells remain protected. Different genera and species are distinguished primarily by the form of the test. Euglypha and Trinema are the most common.

The euglyphids are traditionally grouped with other amoebae. However, genetic studies instead place them with various amoeboid and flagellate groups, forming an assemblage called the Cercozoa. Their closest relatives are the thaumatomonads, flagellates that form similar siliceous tests.

Photosynthetic species are found in the genera Paulinella and Placocista. The photosynthetic abilities in Paulinella comes from an event when a cyanobacterium settled permanently within the cell. In Placocista, where a few species have colonies of symbiotic Chlorella living inside them, the relationship is less intimate. The photosynthetic Paulinella are phototrophic, and the photosynthetic Placocista are mixotrophic.

== Morphology ==
Representation of a euglyphid: 1. Siliceous test plate; 2. Golgi apparatus; modifies proteins and sends them out of the cell; 3. Endoplasmic reticulum, the transport network for molecules going to specific parts of the cell; 4. Nucleus; 5. Nucleolus; 6. Spine; 7. Mitochondrion, creates ATP (energy) for the cell; 8. Matrix vesicle; 9. Matrix; 10. Reserve plate; 11. Pigment granule; 12. Bacterial endosymbiont; 13. Contractile vacuole, regulates the quantity of water inside a cell; 14. Lysosome, holds enzymes; 15. Phagocytic vacuoles with prey; 16. Digestive vacuole; 17. Large central vacuole; 18. Epipodium; 19. Apertural collar; 20. Retracting filopodium; 21. Extended filopodium

== Phylogeny ==
Phylogeny based on Chatelain et al. 2013

- Euglyphida
  - Paulinellidae de Saedeleer 1934 emend. Adl et al. 2012
  - - Cyphoderiidae de Saedeleer 1934
    - - Tracheleuglypha Deflandre 1928
      - Euglyphina
        - Assulinidae Lara et al. 2007
        - - Euglyphidae Wallich 1864 emend Lara et al. 2007
          - - Sphenoderiidae Chatelain et al. 2013
            - Trinematidae Hoogenraad & De Groot 1940 emend Adl et al. 2012

== Taxonomy ==
Order Euglyphida Copeland 1956 emend. Cavalier-Smith 1997

- Genus Tracheleuglypha Deflandre 1928
- Genus Ampullataria van Oye 1956
- Genus Euglyphidion Bonnet 1960
- Genus Heteroglypha Thomas & Gauthier-Lièvre 1959
- Genus Matsakision Bonnet 1967
- Genus Pareuglypha Penard 1902
- Family Paulinellidae de Saedeleer 1934 emend. Adl et al. 2012
  - Genus Micropyxidiella Tarnawski & Lara 2015
  - Genus Ovulinata Anderson, Rogerson & Hannah 1997 [Ovulina Anderson, Rogerson & Hannah 1996 non Ehrenberg 1845]
  - Genus Paulinella Lauterborn 1895
- Family Cyphoderiidae de Saedeleer 1934
  - Genus Campascus Leidy 1877
  - Genus Corythionella Golemansky 1970
  - Genus Cyphoderia Schlumberger 1845
  - Genus Messemvriella Golemansky 1973
  - Genus Pseudocorythion Valkanov 1970
  - Genus Schaudinnula Awerintzew 1907
- Suborder Euglyphina Bovee 1985 emend. Kosakyan et al. 2016
  - Family Assulinidae Lara et al. 2007
    - Genus Assulina Ehrenberg 1872
    - Genus Placocista Leidy 1879
    - Genus Valkanovia Tappan 1966 [Euglyphella Valkanov 1962 non Warthin 1934]
  - Family Euglyphidae Wallich 1864 emend Lara et al. 2007
    - Genus Euglypha Dujardin 1841
    - Genus Scutiglypha Foissner & Schiller 2001
  - Family Sphenoderiidae Chatelain et al. 2013
    - Genus Deharvengia Bonnet 1979
    - Genus Sphenoderia Schlumberger 1845
    - Genus Trachelocorythion Bonnet 1979
  - Family Trinematidae Hoogenraad & De Groot 1940 emend Adl et al. 2012
    - Genus Corythion Taránek 1882
    - Genus Neopileolus Ozdikmen 2009 [Pileolus Coûteaux & Chardez 1981]
    - Genus Playfairina Thomas 1961
    - Genus Puytoracia Bonnet, 1970 non Raabe 1972
    - Genus Trinema Dujardin 1841
