= Apicoplast =

Non-photosynthetic plastid in Apicomplexa

An apicoplast is a derived non-photosynthetic plastid found in most Apicomplexa, including Toxoplasma gondii, and Plasmodium falciparum and other Plasmodium spp. (parasites causing malaria), but not in others such as Cryptosporidium. It originated from red algae through secondary endosymbiosis; this happened before the evolution of the apicomplexans, in the Alveolates. The apicoplast is surrounded by four membranes within the outermost part of the endomembrane system. The apicoplast hosts important metabolic pathways like fatty acid synthesis, isoprenoid precursor synthesis and parts of the heme biosynthetic pathway.

== Significance ==
Apicoplasts are a relict, nonphotosynthetic plastid found in most protozoan parasites belonging to the phylum Apicomplexa. Among the most infamous apicomplexan parasites is Plasmodium falciparum, a causative agent of severe malaria. Because apicoplasts are vital to parasite survival, they provide an enticing target for antimalarial drugs. Specifically, apicoplasts' plant-like properties provide a target for herbicidal drugs. And, with the emergence of malarial strains resistant to current treatments it is paramount that novel therapies, like herbicides, are explored and understood. Furthermore, herbicides may be able to specifically target the parasite's plant-like apicoplast without any noticeable effect on the mammalian host's cells.

== Evolutionary origin ==
Structure suggests that the apicoplast is a product of secondary endosymbiosis. Considerable similarity to the dinoflagellate secondary plastid has been noted and it has since been shown that the two groups share the same plastid acquisition event. An ancient cyanobacterium was first engulfed by a eukaryotic cell but was not digested, forming a symbiotic relationship with the host eukaryotic cell; both the eukaryote and the bacterium mutually benefited from their novel shared existence. This is called primary endosymbiosis, which resulted in a photosynthetic eukaryotic alga. A descendant of this eukaryotic alga was then itself engulfed by a heterotrophic eukaryote with which it formed its own symbiotic relationship and was preserved as a plastid.

The apicoplast evolved in its new role to preserve only those functions and genes necessary to beneficially contribute to the host-organelle relationship. The ancestral genome of more than 150 kb was reduced through deletions and rearrangements to its present 35 kb size. During the reorganization of the plastid the apicoplast lost its ability to photosynthesize. These losses of function are hypothesized to have occurred at an early evolutionary stage in order to have allowed sufficient time for the complete degradation of acknowledged photosynthetic relicts and the disappearance of a nucleomorph.

== Architecture and distribution ==
Most Apicomplexa contain a single ovoid shaped apicoplast that is found at the anterior of the invading parasitic cell. The apicoplast is situated close to the cell's nucleus and often closely associated with a mitochondrion. The small plastid, only 0.15–1.5 μm in diameter, is surrounded by four membranes. The two inner membranes are derived from the algal plastid membranes; the next membrane out is called the periplastid membrane and is derived from the algal plasma membrane; Finally the outermost membrane belongs to the host endomembrane system. Within the apicoplast's stroma is a 35 kb long circular DNA strand that codes for approximately 30 proteins, tRNAs and some RNAs. Particles suspected to be bacterial ribosomes are present. The plastid, at least in the Plasmodium species, also contains "tubular whorls" of membrane that bear a striking resemblance to the thylakoids of their chloroplast relatives. The import of proteins into the apicoplast through the four membranes occurs through translocation complexes that originate from the algal plastid (for example:) or from a duplication of the endoplasmic-reticulum-associated protein degradation (for example:).

== Function ==
The apicoplast is a vital organelle to the parasite's survival. Tetracycline, an antibiotic also used to combat malaria infections, is thought to function by targeting the apicoplast. It hosts four main metabolic pathways:

=== Fatty acid synthesis ===
The destruction of the apicoplast does not immediately kill the parasite but instead prevents it from invading new host cells. This observation suggests that the apicoplast may be involved in lipid metabolism. If unable to synthesize sufficient fatty acids, the parasite is unable to form the parasitophorous vacuole (PV) that is imperative to a successful invasion of host cells. This conclusion is supported by the discovery of type II fatty acid synthase (FAS) machinery in the apicoplast.

=== Isoprenoid synthesis ===
The apicoplast is also thought to have a role in isoprenoid synthesis, which are prosthetic groups on many enzymes and also act as precursors to ubiquinones (involved in electron transport) and dolichols (involved in glycoprotein formation). The apicoplast contains the 2-C-Methyl-D-erythritol 4-phosphate (MEP)/1-deoxy-D-xylulose-5-phosphate (DOXP) pathway for isoprenoid precursor synthesis and is the sole site for such synthesis in the Plasmodium cell.

=== Heme synthesis ===
The apicoplast has also been implicated with heme synthesis and amino acid synthesis. It is also suggested to have a role in cell development. These functions, however, are merely postulations and are not yet conclusively supported by experimentation.

=== Iron-sulphur cluster synthesis ===
Various iron-sulphur cluster biosynthetic enzymes including SufB or Orf470 have been identified in the apicoplast genome.
