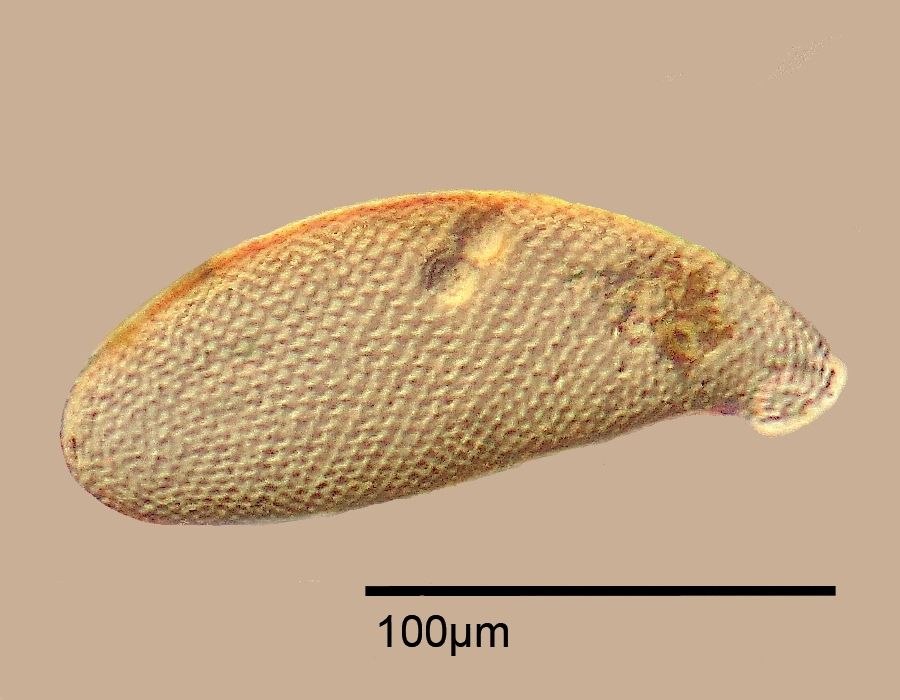
- Cyphoderia ampulla

Scientific classification
- Domain: Eukaryota
- Clade: Sar
- Clade: Rhizaria
- Phylum: Cercozoa
- Class: Imbricatea
- Order: Euglyphida
- Family: Cyphoderiidae
- Genus: Cyphoderia; Schlumberger, 1845

Type species
- Cyphoderia margaritacea Schlumberger 1845

Species
- C. amphoralis (Wailes & Penard 1911); C. ampulla (Ehrenberg 1840) Leidy 1878; C. calceola Penard 1899; C. compressa Golemansky 1979; C. laevis Penard 1902; C. litoralis Golemansky 1973; C. major (Penard 1891); C. margaritacea Schlumberger 1845; C. perlucida Beyens, Chardez & De Bock 1986; C. trocha Penard 1899; C. truncata Schulze 1875; C. ventricosa Chardez 1991; C. venusta Chardez 1992

= Cyphoderia =

Genus of single-celled organisms

Cyphoderia is a genus of marine cercozoa. It used to include Cyphoderia margaritacea, which is now considered a synonym for C. ampulla.
