= Monogalactosyldiacylglycerol synthase =

Class of enzymes

1,2-diacylglycerol 3-beta-galactosyltransferase

Identifiers
- EC no.: 2.4.1.46
- CAS no.: 37277-55-7

Databases
- IntEnz: IntEnz view
- BRENDA: BRENDA entry
- ExPASy: NiceZyme view
- KEGG: KEGG entry
- MetaCyc: metabolic pathway
- PRIAM: profile
- PDB structures: RCSB PDB PDBe PDBsum
- Gene Ontology: AmiGO / QuickGO
Search
- PMC: articles
- PubMed: articles
- NCBI: proteins

In enzymology, a monogalactosyldiacylglycerol synthase (EC 2.4.1.46) is an enzyme that catalyzes the chemical reaction

UDP-galactose + 1,2-diacyl-sn-glycerol $\rightleftharpoons$ UDP + 3-beta-D-galactosyl-1,2-diacyl-sn-glycerol

Thus, the two substrates of this enzyme are UDP-galactose and 1,2-diacyl-sn-glycerol, whereas its two products are UDP and 3-beta-D-galactosyl-1,2-diacyl-sn-glycerol.

This enzyme belongs to the family of glycosyltransferases, specifically the hexosyltransferases. The systematic name of this enzyme class is UDP-galactose:1,2-diacyl-sn-glycerol 3-beta-D-galactosyltransferase. Other names in common use include uridine diphosphogalactose-1,2-diacylglycerol galactosyltransferase, UDP-galactose:diacylglycerol galactosyltransferase, MGDG synthase, UDP galactose-1,2-diacylglycerol galactosyltransferase, UDP-galactose-diacylglyceride galactosyltransferase, UDP-galactose:1,2-diacylglycerol 3-beta-D-galactosyltransferase, 1beta-MGDG, and 1,2-diacylglycerol 3-beta-galactosyltransferase. This enzyme participates in glycerolipid metabolism.
