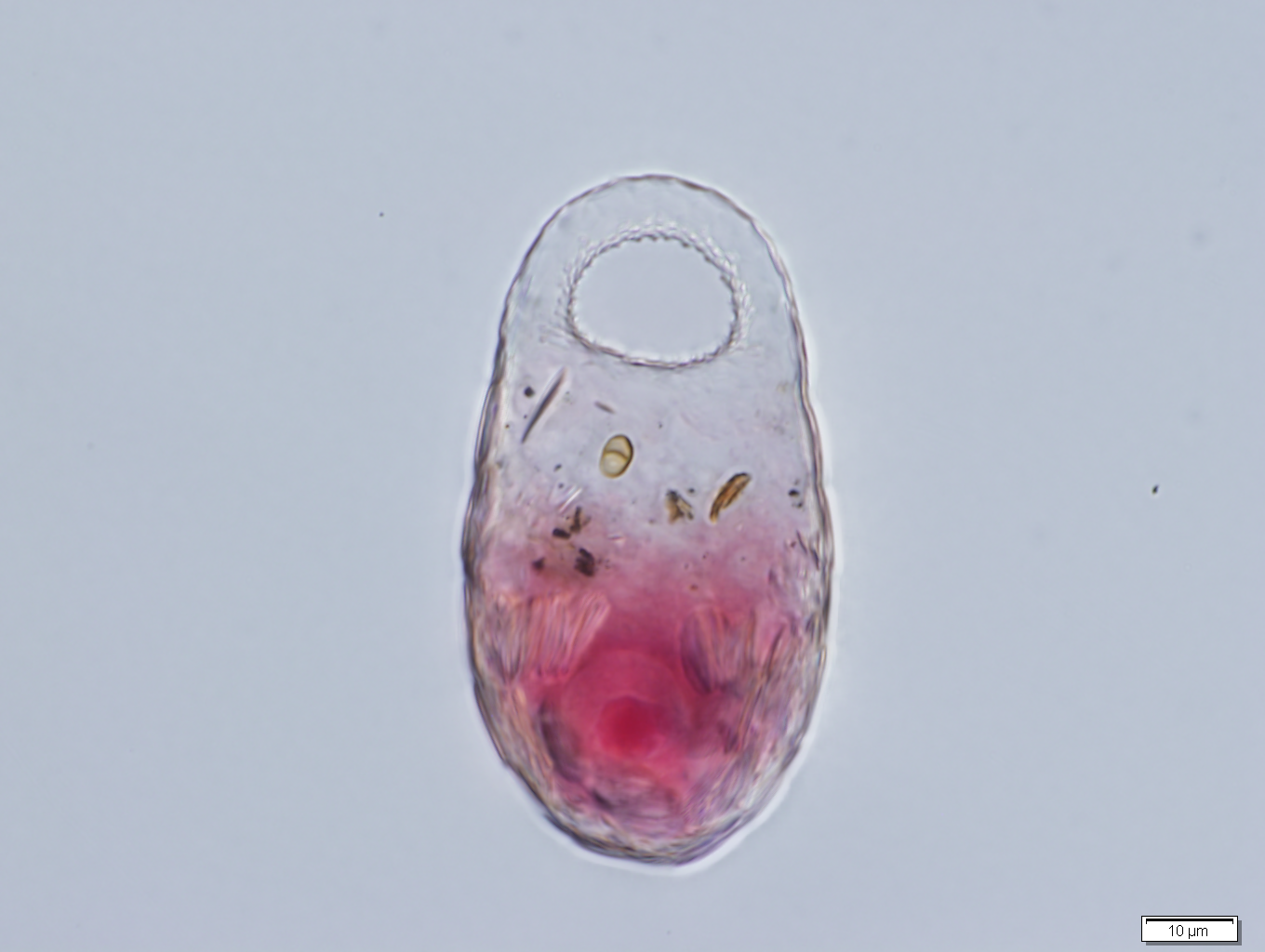
- Trinema enchelys

Scientific classification
- Domain: Eukaryota
- Clade: Sar
- Clade: Rhizaria
- Phylum: Cercozoa
- Class: Imbricatea
- Order: Euglyphida
- Family: Trinematidae
- Genus: Trinema; Dujardin, 1841

= Trinema =

Genus of single-celled organisms

Trinema is a genus of testate amoeba in the phylum Cercozoa. It includes the species Trinema lineare. Species of Trinema are common in freshwater and terrestrial habitats.

== Description ==
Trinema is a testate amoeba: a type of amoeba that produces a protective outer shell, called a test. Tests are made of two different types of scales: large circular plates and smaller plates overlapping between them. The aperture (the hole through which the pseudopodia emerge) is circular, near the end of the test, and surrounded by toothed apertural scales. Trinema is a filose amoeba, meaning it moves via filopodia.

Species are distinguished based on the size and shape of the test and aperture. Species show considerable variation in morphological characteristics, which makes them more difficult to identify.
