= Robert Lauterborn =

German botanist, limnologist and protozoologist

Robert Lauterborn (23 October 1869 - 11 September 1952) was a German botanist, limnologist and protozoologist.

Lauterborn was born in Ludwigshafen where his father was a publisher. His mother died when he was two and he was taken care of by his aunt Pauline while his father married his mother's sister. Robert went to the local school and then studied at Mannheim, leaving school in 1889 with an Abitur. He then studied zoology and botany in Heidelberg and graduated Dr. phil. nat. in 1897. He later became a professor in Karlsruhe.

Lauterborn worked on river ecology and the biology of wastewater. His Ph.D. work was on dinoflagellates (esp. Ceratium hirundinella). He later conducted large scale studies on the limnology of the Rhine waters. He also transcribed and published the work of the Strasbourg fisherman-naturalist Leonhard Baldner who had also conducted studies on the Rhine in the 1600s. He described the genus Paulinella (named after his step-mother). Lauterborn influenced the work of his student August Thienemann.

The genus Lauterborniella (in the algae family) was named in his honour by Schmidle in 1900.

The research vessel R/V Robert Lauterborn on Lake Constance is named after him.

The standard author abbreviation Lauterborn is used to indicate this person as the author when citing a botanical name.
