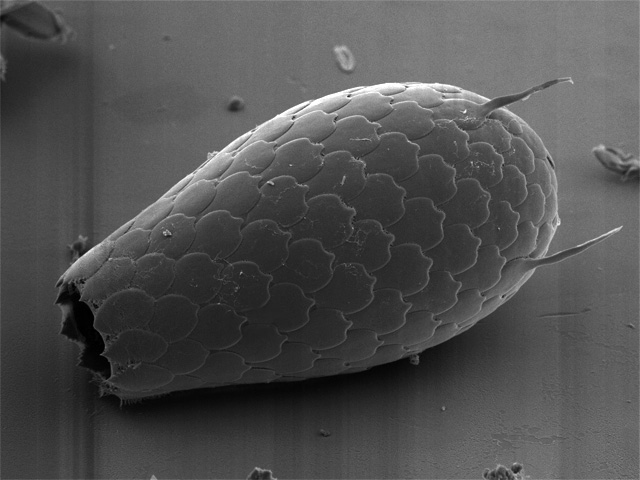
- Euglypha sp.

Scientific classification
- Domain: Eukaryota
- Clade: Sar
- Clade: Rhizaria
- Phylum: Cercozoa
- Class: Imbricatea
- Order: Euglyphida
- Family: Euglyphidae
- Genus: Euglypha; Dujardin, 1840

= Euglypha =

Genus of filose amoebas

Euglypha is a genus of cercozoans. It includes the species Euglypha rotunda.
