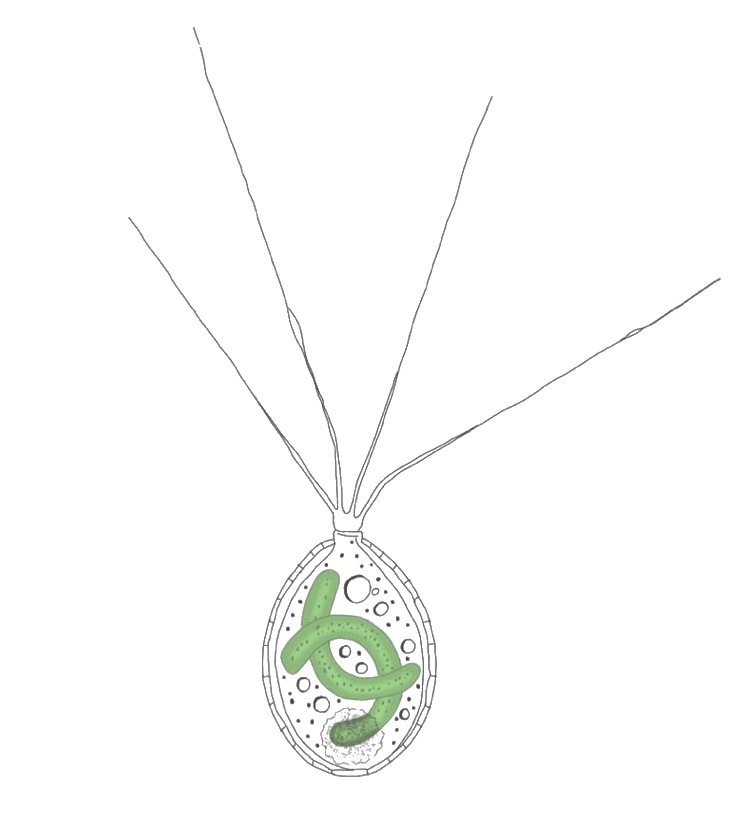
- Paulinella chromatophora

Scientific classification
- Domain: Eukaryota
- Clade: Sar
- Clade: Rhizaria
- Phylum: Cercozoa
- Class: Imbricatea
- Order: Euglyphida
- Family: Paulinellidae de Saedeleer 1934

Genera
- Micropyxidiella; Ovulinata; Paulinella

= Paulinellidae =

Genus of single-celled organisms

Paulinellidae is a family of testate amoebae in the order Euglyphida. They are found mostly in marine habitats, but also occur in freshwater or in soil.

Members of the family are single-celled organisms with filose pseudopods, surrounded in a shell (called a test) made of siliceous or organic scales. The test is pyriform in shape, and scales (when present) are long with the length perpendicular to the aperture.
