= Gloeomargarita =

Scientific classification
- Domain: Bacteria
- Kingdom: Bacillati
- Phylum: Cyanobacteriota
- Class: Chroococcophyceae
- Order: Gloeomargaritales; Moreira et al. 2017
- Family: Gloeomargaritaceae; Moreira et al. 2017
- Genus: Gloeomargarita; Moreira et al. 2017

Genus of cyanobacteria

Gloeomargarita is a genus of cyanobacteria.

Species:

- Gloeomargarita ahousahtiae Bacchetta et al. 2024
- Gloeomargarita lithophora Moreira et al. 2017
