= Stroma (fluid) =

In plants, the colorless fluid surrounding the grana within the chloroplast

Cell biology
- Chloroplast
- Components of a typical chloroplast 1 Granum; 2 Chloroplast envelope 2.1 Outer membrane 2.2 Intermembrane space 2.3 Inner membrane 3 Thylakoid 3.1 Thylakoid space (lumen) 3.2 Thylakoid membrane 4 Stromal thylakoid 5 Stroma ◄ You are here 6 Nucleoid (DNA ring); 7 Ribosome; 8 Plastoglobulus; 9 Starch granule

Stroma, in botany, refers to the colorless fluid surrounding the thylakoids (membrane-bound, sub-organelle compartments) within the chloroplast.

After being initiated in the thylakoid membrane, the process of photosynthesis is completed in the stroma.

Photosynthesis occurs in two stages. In the first stage, light-dependent reactions capture the energy of light and use it to make the energy-storage molecules ATP and NADPH. During the second stage, the light-independent reactions use these products to fix carbon by capturing and reducing carbon dioxide.

The series of biochemical redox reactions which take place in the stroma are collectively called the Calvin cycle or light-independent reactions. There are three phases: carbon fixation, reduction reactions, and ribulose 1,5-bisphosphate (RuBP) regeneration.

The stroma is also the location of chloroplast DNA and chloroplast ribosomes, and thus also the location of molecular processes including chloroplast DNA replication, and transcription/translation of some chloroplast proteins.

== See also ==
- Granum
