= Triose phosphate translocator =

The triose phosphate translocator is an integral membrane protein found in the inner membrane of chloroplasts. It exports triose phosphate (Dihydroxyacetone phosphate) in exchange for inorganic phosphate and is therefore classified as an antiporter. The imported phosphate is then used for ATP regeneration via the light-dependent-reaction; the ATP may then for example be used for further reactions in the Calvin-cycle. The translocator protein is responsible for exporting all the carbohydrate produced in photosynthesis by plants and therefore most of the carbon in food that one eats has been transported by the triose phosphate translocator. Its three-dimensional structure was reported in 2017, revealing how it recognizes two different substrates to catalyze the strict 1:1 exchange.
