= TIC/TOC complex =

A diagram of a chloroplast. The TIC and TOC complexes are located on different sides of the chloroplast membrane.

The TIC and TOC complexes are translocons located in the chloroplast of a eukaryotic cell, that is, protein complexes that facilitate the transfer of proteins in and out through the chloroplast's membrane. It mainly transports proteins made in the cytoplasm into the chloroplast. The TIC complex (translocon on the inner chloroplast membrane) is located in the inner envelope of the chloroplast. The TOC complex (translocon on the outer chloroplast membrane) is located in the outer envelope of the chloroplast.

== TOM/TIM complex vs. TOC/TIC complex ==
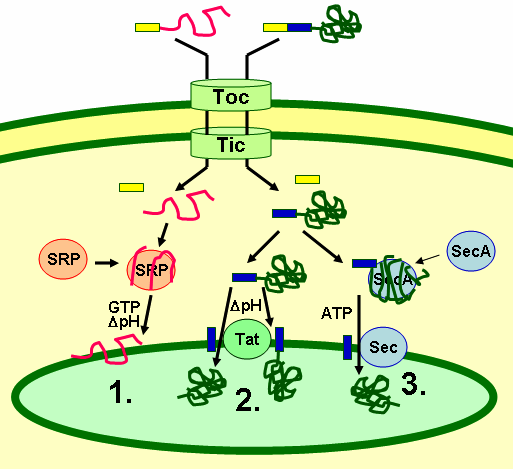
Representation of Thylakoid targeting. A stromal transit peptide sequence (yellow rectangle) is exposed on the translated protein in the cytosol, which signals the ribosome and translocons to begin translocation into the stroma. Once in the stroma, signal peptidases cleave the first peptide sequence only to reveal a Thylakoid transit peptide sequence (blue rectangle). This transports the protein across the thylakoid membrane.

This protein complex is functionally similar to the TOM/TIM Complex located on the outer and inner membranes of the mitochondria, in the sense that it too transports proteins across multiple membranes and into the lumen of an organelle. Both complexes (TOC/TIC) are GTPases, that is, they must both hydrolyze GTP in order to power the translocation. The chloroplast also harnesses the power of an electrochemical gradient using protons. The gradient is only used to power transport across the thylakoid membrane, however, while the gradient in the mitochondria is used to power transport across its inner membrane.

Furthermore, due to the thylakoid membrane located inside of the chloroplast, a second transit peptide sequence must be located on the imported protein. In the cytosol, a transit peptide that signals for transit of the protein to the chloroplast is exposed. This initiates transport and translocation through the TIC/TOC complexes into the stroma of the chloroplast. It is there that a signal peptidase cleaves the stromal transit peptide, only to reveal a second transit peptide sequence underneath; this time directing to the thylakoid membrane. There are at least three ways for the protein to go through the thylakoid membrane: through a ATP-hydrolyzing Type II secretion system, through a SecY translocon, or through the Tat/VSP pathway.

AIG1-type guanine nucleotide-binding (G) domain

Identifiers
- Symbol: G_AIG1
- Pfam: PF04548
- InterPro: IPR006703
- TCDB: 3.A.9
- Membranome: 176
Available protein structures:
- Pfam: structures / ECOD
- PDB: RCSB PDB; PDBe; PDBj
- PDBsum: structure summary

== See also ==
- Chloroplast DNA
- Chloroplast
