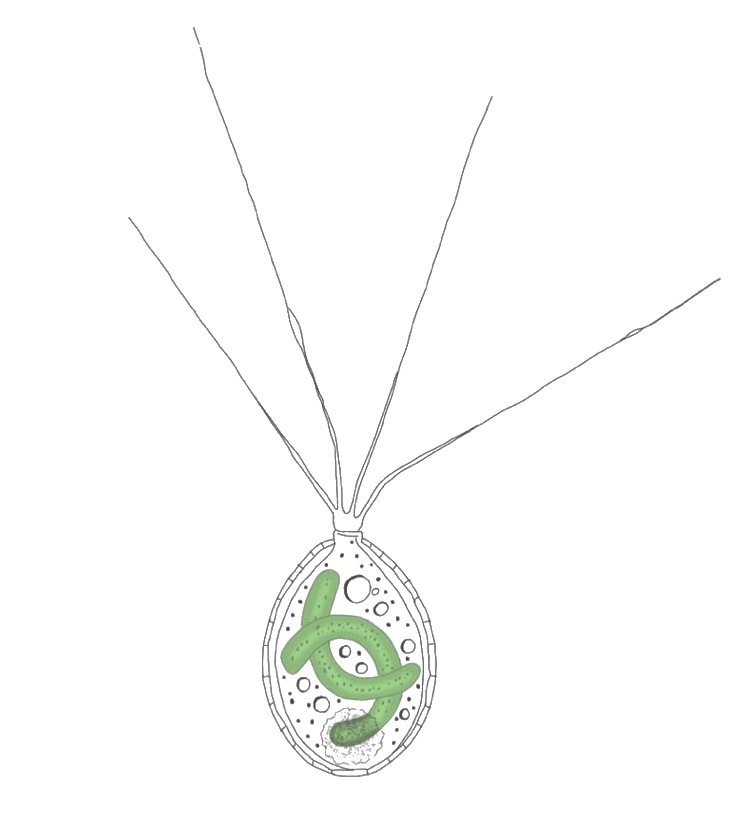

Scientific classification
- Domain: Eukaryota
- Supergroup: Rhizaria
- Phylum: Cercozoa
- Subphylum: Filosa
- Class: Imbricatea
- Order: Euglyphida
- Family: Paulinellidae
- Genus: Paulinella; Lauterborn

Type species
- Paulinella chromatophora Lauterborn 1895

Species
- P. acadia, 2025; P. agassizi, 2009; P. bulloides; P. carsoni, 2009; P. chromatophora, 1895; P. gigantica, 2009; P. gracilis; P. indentata, 1996; P. intermedia, 1993; P. lauterborni, 2009; P. longichromatophora, 2016; P. marae, 2026; P. micropora, 2017; P. multipora, 2009; P. murrayi, 2026; P. osloensis; P. ovalis, 1919; P. quinqueloba; P. riveroi; P. sphaeroides; P. subcarinata; P. subsphaerica; P. suzukii, 2009; P. trinitatensis

Synonyms
- Calycomonas

= Paulinella =

Genus of single-celled organisms

Paulinella is a genus of amoeboid protists with at least twelve species of freshwater and marine euglyphids. Like many other euglyphids, it is covered by rows of siliceous scales, and use filose pseudopods to crawl over the substrate of the benthic zone. Species within the group can be distinguished by features like the overall shell dimensions, the number of vertical scale rows (3–5), the number of scales per row (7–14) and the number of oral scales.

== Discovery ==
P. chromatophora was discovered in sediments of the river Rhine on Christmas Eve 1894 by German biologist Robert Lauterborn, who named it Paulinella after his stepmother Pauline.

== Symbiosis ==
Its best known members are the six photosynthetic species: the two freshwater and brackish forms P. chromatophora and P. micropora, the three brackish forms P. acadia, P. marae, and P. murrayi, and the marine form P. longichromatophora, which have recently (in evolutionary terms) taken on an ingested cyanobacterium as an endosymbiont. As a result, they are no longer able to perform phagocytosis like their non-photosynthetic relatives.

The event that led to permanent endosymbiosis probably occurred with a cyanobiont. The resulting organelle is a photosynthetic organelle that is often referred to as a 'cyanelle' or chromatophore, and it represents the only known primary endosymbiosis event of photosynthetic cyanobacteria (other than the origin of chloroplast), although primary endosymbiosis with a non-photosynthetic cyanobacterial symbiont have occurred in the diatom family Rhopalodiaceae and the alga Braarudosphaera bigelowii.

The endosymbiotic event happened about 90–140 million years ago when an α-cyanobacterium (rather than a β-cyanobacterium which the plastids in Archaeplastida originates from), who diverged about 500 million years ago from the ancestors of its sister clade that consist of the living members of the cyanobacteria genera Prochlorococcus and Synechococcus "marine clade", was permanently established within the amoeba. It is estimated the last common ancestor of extant photosynthetic species lived about 60 million years ago.

This is striking because the chloroplasts of all other known photosynthetic eukaryotes derive ultimately from a single cyanobacterium endosymbiont, which was taken in about 1.6 billion years ago by an ancestral archaeplastidan (and subsequently adopted into other eukaryote groups through secondary endosymbiosis events, and later tertiary and quaternary endosymbiosis, etc.). The only exception is the ciliate Pseudoblepharisma tenue, which in addition to a photosynthetic symbiont that is a captured green algae, also has a photosynthetic prokaryote as a symbiont; a purple bacterium with a reduced genome, instead of a cyanobacterium.

=== Genomics ===
The chromatophore genome has gone through a reduction, and is now just one third the size of the genome of its closest free living relatives, but still 10-fold larger than true plastid (Note: In a strict sense, plastids only refer to organelles deriving from the archaeplastidan integration event.) genomes. Some of the genes have been lost, others have migrated to the amoeba's nucleus through endosymbiotic gene transfer. It is estimated that 0.3-0.8% of Paulinella chromatophora's genes were derived from its endosymbiont, in addition to a small amount of genes from other organisms. Other genes have degenerated due to Muller's ratchet – accumulations of harmful mutations due to genetic isolation, and have probably been replaced with genes from other microbes through horizontal gene transfer. Some of the genes the nucleus received from the chromatophore were multiplied many times over through a "copy-paste" mechanism called retrotransposition, enabling them to function more efficiently and making them more tolerant against toxic compounds associated with photosynthesis. This changed the metabolism of the amoeba so much that it could no longer feed on microbes like its ancestors, and it became completely dependent on its endosymbiont, which in turn has lost so many genes it can no longer survive outside its host cell. The amoebae have evolved KR01 genes that enhance carbon dioxide transport to the chromatophores.

The nuclear genes of P. chromatophora (those regions not affected by endosymbiotic gene transfer) are most closely related to the heterotrophic P. ovalis. P. ovalis is a marine heterotrophic species of Paulinella that has been shown to eat cyanobacteria and bacteria. P. ovalis also have at least two cyanobacterial-like genes, which were probably integrated into their genome through horizontal gene transfer from its cyanobacterial prey. Similar genes could have made the photosynthetic species pre-equipped to accept the chromatophore. The presence of extant heterotrophic lineages makes Paulinella a valuable model for unravelling early stages of primary endosymbiosis event and studying the post symbiotic genome evolution of both the plastid and the host.

=== Physiology ===
Paulinella show both a very slow growth rate and sensitivity to light, divide every 6–7 days, and prefer low light conditions, probably as a protection against oxidative stress and other light related stress as it doesn't have the same degree of photoprotection mechanisms found in organisms with a photosynthetic apparatus of Archaeplastid origin, which has a much longer evolutionary history.
