= Galactolipid =

Class of chemical compounds

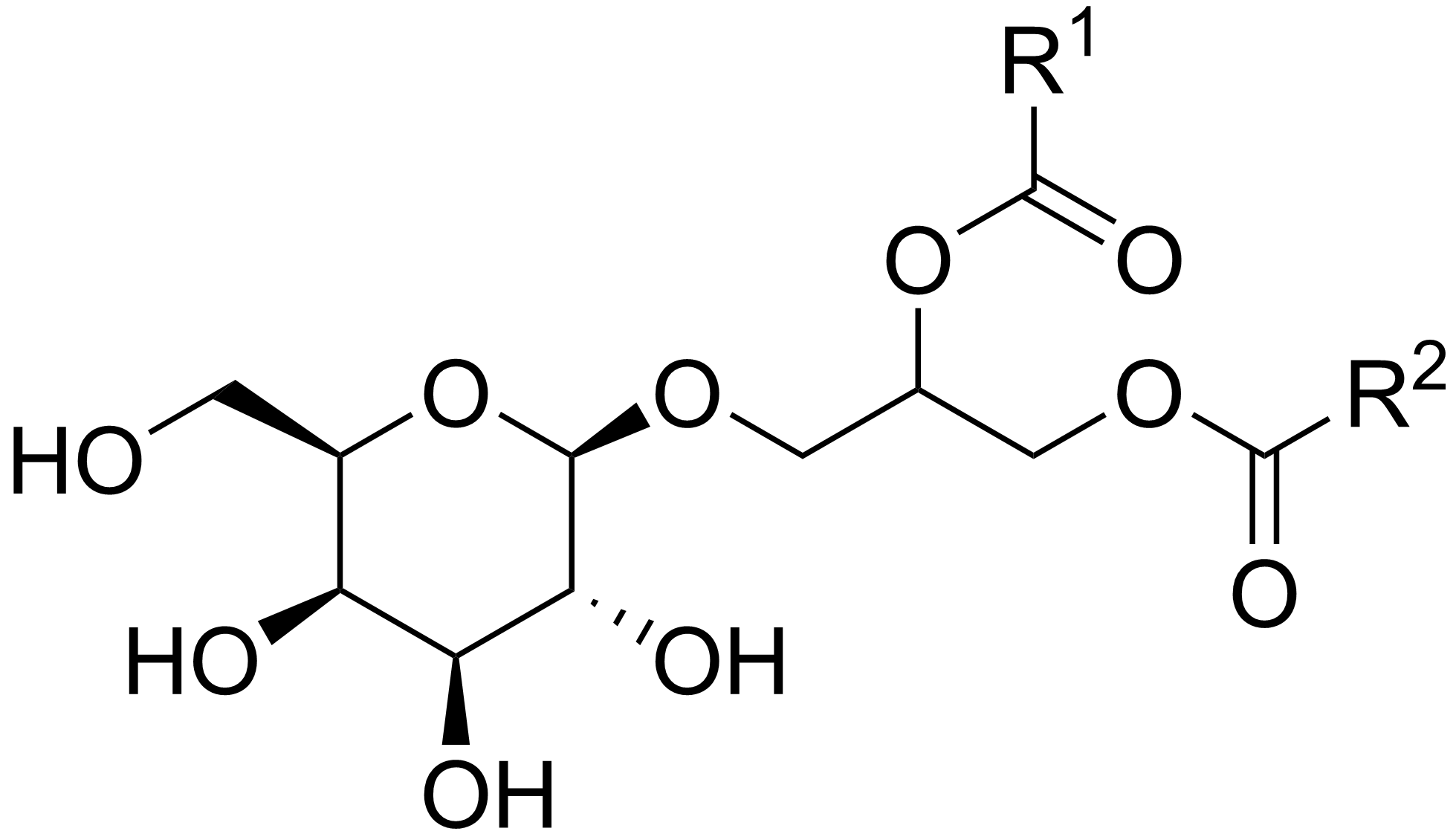
General chemical structure of a monogalactosyl diacylglycerol (MGDG), a prevalent type of galactolipid. R^{1} and R^{2} are fatty chains.

Galactolipids are a type of glycolipid whose sugar group is galactose. They differ from glycosphingolipids in that they do not have nitrogen in their composition.

They are the main part of plant membrane lipids where they substitute phospholipids to conserve phosphate for other essential processes. These chloroplast membranes contain a high quantity of monogalactosyldiacylglycerol (MGDG) and digalactosyldiacylglycerol (DGDG).

They probably also assume a direct role in photosynthesis, as they have been found in the X-ray structures of photosynthetic complexes.

Galactolipids are more bioavailable than free fatty acids, and have been shown to exhibit COX mediated anti-inflammatory activity. Bio-guided fractionation of spinach leaves (Spinacia oleracea) revealed alpha-linolenic acid galactolipids (18:3, n-3) were responsible for inhibitory effects on tumor promoter-induced Epstein-Barr virus (EBV) activation. Recently, it has been demonstrated that this same galactolipid, 1,2-di-O-α-linolenoyl-3-O-α-D-galactopyranosyl-sn-glycerol, may be important for the anti-inflammatory activity of Dog Rose (Rosa canina), a medicinal plant with documented effect on inflammatory diseases such as arthritis.

The galactosphingolipid galactocerebroside (GalC) and its sulfated derivative sulfatide are also in abundance present (together with a small group of proteins) in myelin, the membrane around the axons in the nervous system of vertebrates.

It is galactolipids, rather than phlorotannins, that act as herbivore deterrents in Fucus vesiculosus against the sea urchin Arbacia punctulata.
