= Ptosis =

Ptosis (from Greek πτῶσις 'falling, a fall, dropped') refers to droopiness or abnormal downward displacement of a body part or organ.

== Medicine ==
- Ptosis (eyelid)
- Ptosis (chin)
- Ptosis (breasts)
- Visceroptosis, of the abdominal viscera
  - Gastroptosis, of the stomach
- Nephroptosis, of the kidney

== Other ==
- The Fall of Satan

== See also ==
- Prolapse, a condition in which organs fall down or slip out of place
- Proptosis, or Exophthalmos
