= Carbohydrate metabolism =

Biochemical process in living organisms

Carbohydrate metabolism is the whole of the biochemical processes responsible for the metabolic formation, breakdown, and interconversion of carbohydrates in living organisms, primarily for energy metabolism. Carbohydrate biology unrelated to energy metabolism is encompassed in the process of glycosylation, where complex carbohydrate chains or glycans are covalently linked to a massive range of macromolcules.

Carbohydrates are central to many essential metabolic pathways.After being broken down into other molecules, they may enter metabolic pathways. Hormonal regulation via insulin and glucagon maintains blood glucose homeostasis. Plants synthesize carbohydrates from carbon dioxide and water through photosynthesis, allowing them to store energy absorbed from sunlight internally. When animals and fungi consume plants, they use cellular respiration to break down these stored carbohydrates to make energy available to cells. Both animals and plants temporarily store the released energy in the form of high-energy molecules, such as adenosine triphosphate (ATP), for use in various cellular processes.

While carbohydrates are essential to human biological processes, consuming them is not essential for humans. There are healthy human populations that do not consume carbohydrates. In humans, carbohydrates are available directly from consumption, from carbohydrate storage, or by conversion from fat components including fatty acids that are either stored or consumed directly.

== Metabolic pathways ==
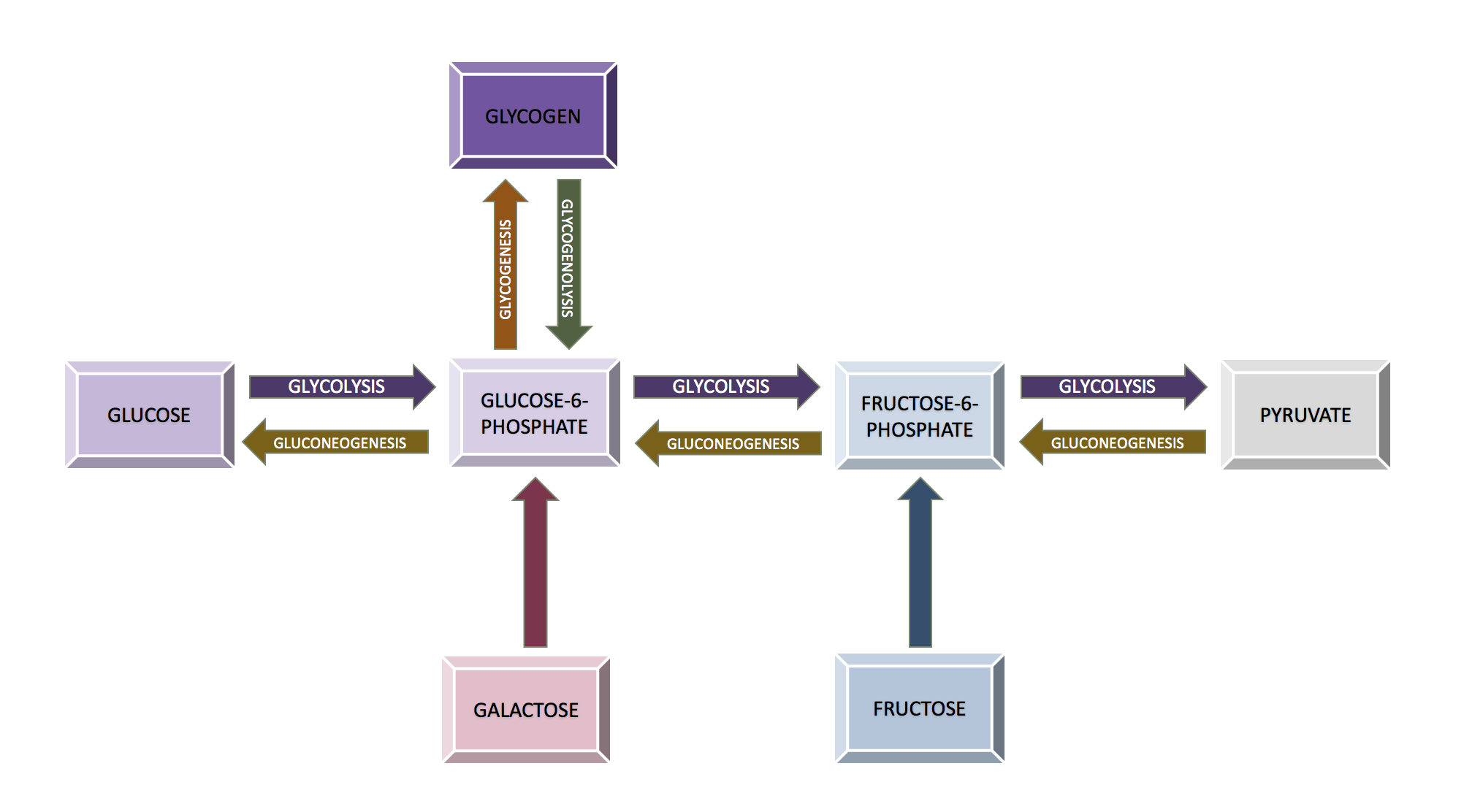
Overview of connections between metabolic processes.

=== Glycolysis ===
Glycolysis is the process of breaking down a glucose molecule into two pyruvate molecules, while storing energy released during this process as adenosine triphosphate (ATP) and nicotinamide adenine dinucleotide (NADH). Nearly all organisms that break down glucose utilize glycolysis. Glucose regulation and product use are the primary categories in which these pathways differ between organisms. In some tissues and organisms, glycolysis is the sole method of energy production. This pathway is common to both anaerobic and aerobic respiration.

Glycolysis consists of ten steps, split into two phases. During the first phase, it requires the breakdown of two ATP molecules. During the second phase, chemical energy from the intermediates is transferred into ATP and NADH. The breakdown of one molecule of glucose results in two molecules of pyruvate, which can be further oxidized to access more energy in later processes.

Glycolysis can be regulated at different steps of the process through feedback regulation. The most regulated step is the third step. This regulation is to ensure that the body is not over-producing pyruvate molecules. The regulation also allows for the storage of glucose molecules into fatty acids. There are various enzymes that are used throughout glycolysis. The enzymes upregulate, downregulate, and feedback regulate the process.

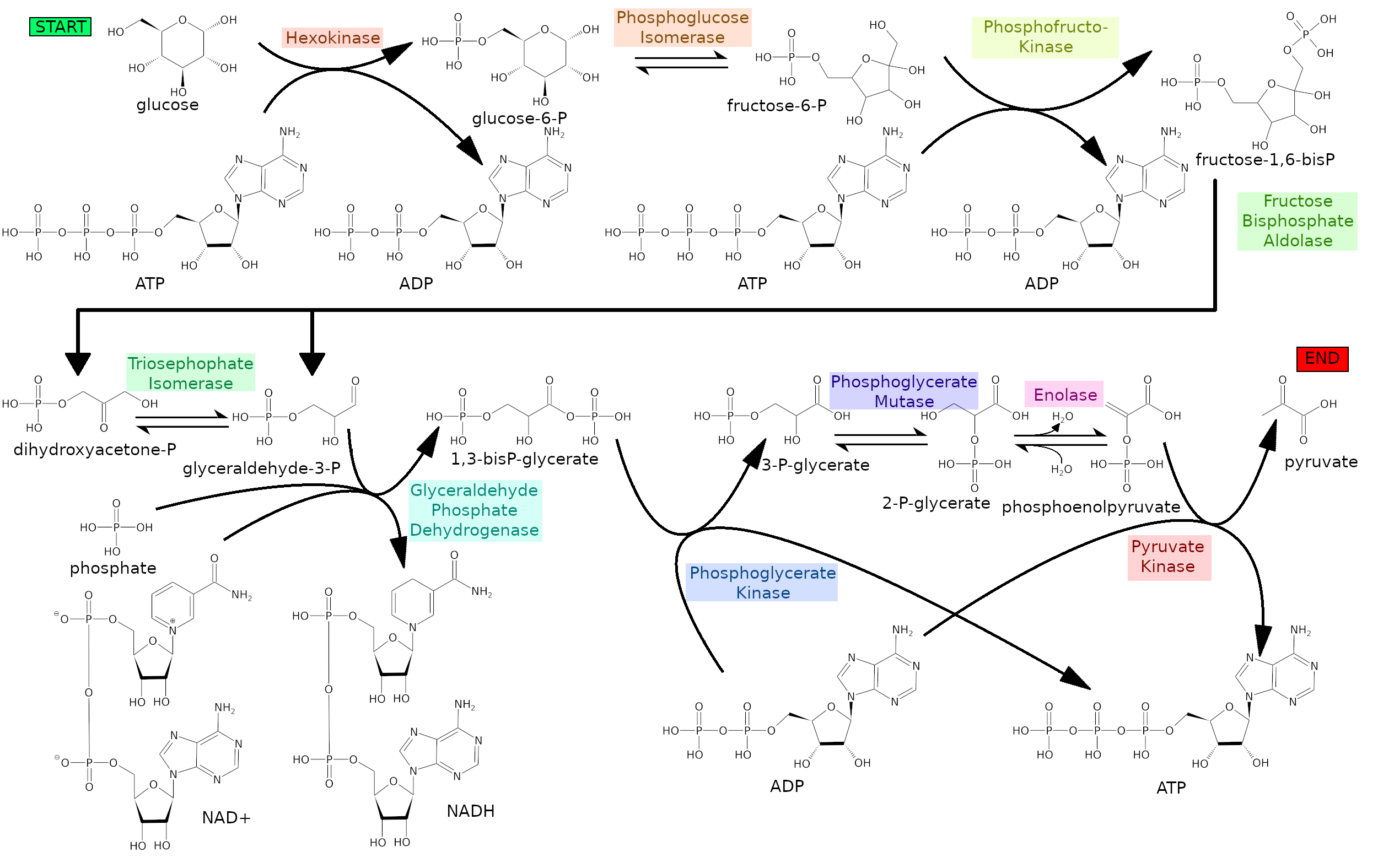
The Glycolysis pathway diagram illustrates the metabolic reactions that allow for the breakdown of glucose into pyruvate, often as preparation for further catabolic reactions.

=== Gluconeogenesis ===
Gluconeogenesis (GNG) is a metabolic pathway that results in the generation of glucose from certain non-carbohydrate carbon substrates. It is a ubiquitous process, present in plants, animals, fungi, bacteria, and other microorganisms. In vertebrates, gluconeogenesis occurs mainly in the liver and, to a lesser extent, in the cortex of the kidneys. It is one of two primary mechanisms – the other being degradation of glycogen (glycogenolysis) – used by humans and many other animals to maintain blood sugar levels, avoiding low levels (hypoglycemia). In ruminants, because dietary carbohydrates tend to be metabolized by rumen organisms, gluconeogenesis occurs regardless of fasting, low-carbohydrate diets, exercise, etc. In many other animals, the process occurs during periods of fasting, starvation, low-carbohydrate diets, or intense exercise.

In humans, substrates for gluconeogenesis may come from any non-carbohydrate sources that can be converted to pyruvate or intermediates of glycolysis (see figure). For the breakdown of proteins, these substrates include glucogenic amino acids (although not ketogenic amino acids); from breakdown of lipids (such as triglycerides), they include glycerol, odd-chain fatty acids (although not even-chain fatty acids, see below); and from other parts of metabolism they include lactate from the Cori cycle. Under conditions of prolonged fasting, acetone derived from ketone bodies can also serve as a substrate, providing a pathway from fatty acids to glucose. Although most gluconeogenesis occurs in the liver, the relative contribution of gluconeogenesis by the kidney is increased in diabetes and prolonged fasting.

The gluconeogenesis pathway is highly endergonic until it is coupled to the hydrolysis of ATP or guanosine triphosphate (GTP), effectively making the process exergonic. For example, the pathway leading from pyruvate to glucose-6-phosphate requires 4 molecules of ATP and 2 molecules of GTP to proceed spontaneously. These ATPs are supplied from fatty acid catabolism via beta oxidation.

=== Glycogenolysis ===
Glycogenolysis refers to the breakdown of glycogen. In the liver, muscles, and the kidney, this process occurs to provide glucose when necessary. A single glucose molecule is cleaved from a branch of glycogen, and is transformed into glucose-1-phosphate during this process. This molecule can then be converted to glucose-6-phosphate, an intermediate in the glycolysis pathway.

Glucose-6-phosphate can then progress through glycolysis. Glycolysis only requires the input of one molecule of ATP when the glucose originates in glycogen. Alternatively, glucose-6-phosphate can be converted back into glucose in the liver and the kidneys, allowing it to raise blood glucose levels if necessary.

Glucagon in the liver stimulates glycogenolysis when the blood glucose is lowered, known as hypoglycemia. The glycogen in the liver can function as a backup source of glucose between meals. Liver glycogen mainly serves the central nervous system. Adrenaline stimulates the breakdown of glycogen in the skeletal muscle during exercise. In the muscles, glycogen ensures a rapidly accessible energy source for movement.

=== Glycogenesis ===
Glycogenesis refers to the process of synthesizing glycogen. In humans, glucose can be converted to glycogen via this process. Glycogen is a highly branched structure, consisting of the core protein Glycogenin, surrounded by branches of glucose units, linked together. The branching of glycogen increases its solubility, and allows for a higher number of glucose molecules to be accessible for breakdown at the same time. Glycogenesis occurs primarily in the liver, skeletal muscles, and kidney. The Glycogenesis pathway consumes energy, like most synthetic pathways, because an ATP and a UTP are consumed for each molecule of glucose introduced.

=== Pentose phosphate pathway ===
The pentose phosphate pathway is an alternative method of oxidizing glucose. It occurs in the liver, adipose tissue, adrenal cortex, testis, mammary glands, phagocytes, and red blood cells. It produces products that are used in other cell processes, while reducing NADP to NADPH. This pathway is regulated through changes in the activity of glucose-6-phosphate dehydrogenase.

=== Fructose metabolism ===
Fructose must undergo certain extra steps in order to enter the glycolysis pathway. Enzymes located in certain tissues can add a phosphate group to fructose. This phosphorylation creates fructose-6-phosphate, an intermediate in the glycolysis pathway that can be broken down directly in those tissues. This pathway occurs in the muscles, adipose tissue, and kidney. In the liver, enzymes produce fructose-1-phosphate, which enters the glycolysis pathway and is later cleaved into glyceraldehyde and dihydroxyacetone phosphate.

=== Galactose metabolism ===
Lactose, or milk sugar, consists of one molecule of glucose and one molecule of galactose. After separation from glucose, galactose travels to the liver for conversion to glucose. Galactokinase uses one molecule of ATP to phosphorylate galactose. The phosphorylated galactose is then converted to glucose-1-phosphate, and then eventually glucose-6-phosphate, which can be broken down in glycolysis.

== Energy production ==
Many steps of carbohydrate metabolism allow the cells to access energy and store it more transiently in ATP. The cofactors NAD^{+} and FAD are sometimes reduced during this process to form NADH and FADH_{2}, which drive the creation of ATP in other processes. A molecule of NADH can produce 1.5–2.5 molecules of ATP, whereas a molecule of FADH_{2} yields 1.5 molecules of ATP.

Energy produced during metabolism of one glucose molecule
Pathway	ATP input	ATP output	Net ATP	NADH output	FADH_{2} output	ATP final yield
Glycolysis (aerobic)	2	4	2	2	0	5-7
Citric-acid cycle	0	2	2	6	2	17-25

Typically, the complete breakdown of one molecule of glucose by aerobic respiration (i.e. involving glycolysis, the citric-acid cycle and oxidative phosphorylation, the last providing the most energy) is usually about 30–32 molecules of ATP. Oxidation of one gram of carbohydrate yields approximately 4 kcal of energy.

== Carbohydrate consumption ==
Humans can consume a variety of carbohydrates, the most common include glucose, fructose, and galactose. Digestion breaks down complex carbohydrates into their chemical building blocks, for easier absorption. Different carbohydrates may enter into the glycolysis pathway at different stages. For example, fructose metabolism can involve phosphorylation of fructose into fructose 6-phosphate or being converted into another glycolytic intermediate, both of which allow entrance into the glycolysis pathway. Whereas galactose is initially broken down in Leloir pathway before entering glycolysis. After absorption in the gut, the monosaccharides are transported, through the portal vein, to the liver, where all non-glucose monosacharids (fructose, galactose) are transformed into glucose as well. Glucose (blood sugar) is distributed to cells in the tissues, where it is broken down via cellular respiration, or stored as glycogen. In cellular (aerobic) respiration, glucose and oxygen are metabolized to release energy, with carbon dioxide and water as endproducts.

== Hormonal regulation ==
Glucoregulation is the maintenance of steady levels of glucose in the body.

Simplified diagram of insulin and glucagon signaling in the fed and fasted states.

Hormones released from the pancreas regulate the overall metabolism of glucose. Insulin and glucagon are the primary hormones involved in maintaining a steady level close to 4.5 mM of glucose in the blood, and the release of each is controlled by the amount of nutrients currently available. When blood glucose levels are high after eating, commonly referred to as the "fed state", which insulin regulates by stimulating many steps, to eventually lower the glucose levels in the blood. The amount of insulin released in the blood and sensitivity of the cells to the insulin both determine the amount of glucose that cells break down. The "fasted state" occurs when blood glucose levels are low, specifically in times of starvation or fasting, glucagon is the regulator here that stimulates the gluconeogenesis and glycogenolysis pathways to raise blood glucose levels. Increased levels of glucagon activate enzymes, like glycogen phosphorylase, that catalyze glycogenolysis, and inhibits enzymes, like glycogen synthase, which catalyzes glycogenesis. This results from the cAMP cascade, which triggers PKA (protein kinase A) to phosphorylate the bifunctional enzyme PFK-2 (Phosphofructokinase-2)/FBPase-2 (fructose-2,6-bisphosphatase), activating the FBPase-2 portion, which lowers the concentration of F2,6BP (Fructose-2,6-Phosphate). The decreasing concentration is responsible for reducing PFK-1 (Phosphofructokinase-1) activity and the disinhibition of FBPase-1 (Fructose-1,6-biphosphatase), resulting in the triggering of gluconeogenesis and the creation of glucose to return the body's blood glucose levels back to normal. This specific process takes place within the liver.

Conversely, glycogenesis is enhanced and glycogenolysis inhibited when there are high levels of insulin in the blood. Insulin is released to stimulate the uptake of glucose from the blood stream, it stimulates GLUT4 transporter surface activity which help to increase the rate of this process in adipose and skeletal tissues, different tissues have different glucose transporters. Phosphoprotein Phosphatase (PP1) is activated, which dephosphorylates PFK-2/FBPase-2, activating PFK-2. This increases the concentration of F2,6BP which activates PFK-1, inhibits FBPase-1, and allows glycolysis to proceed and decreases blood glucose levels.

The level of circulatory glucose (known informally as "blood sugar"), as well as the detection of nutrients in the Duodenum is the most important factor determining the amount of glucagon or insulin produced. The release of glucagon is precipitated by low levels of blood glucose, whereas high levels of blood glucose stimulates cells to produce insulin. Because the level of circulatory glucose is largely determined by the intake of dietary carbohydrates, diet controls major aspects of metabolism via insulin. In humans, insulin is made by beta cells in the pancreas, fat is stored in adipose tissue cells, and glycogen is both stored and released as needed by liver cells. Regardless of insulin levels, no glucose is released to the blood from internal glycogen stores from muscle cells.

== Carbohydrates as storage ==
Carbohydrates are typically stored as long polymers of glucose molecules with glycosidic bonds for structural support (e.g. chitin, cellulose) or for energy storage (e.g. glycogen, starch). However, the strong affinity of most carbohydrates for water makes storage of large quantities of carbohydrates inefficient due to the large molecular weight of the solvated water-carbohydrate complex. In most organisms, excess carbohydrates are regularly catabolised to form acetyl-CoA, which is a feed stock for the fatty acid synthesis pathway; fatty acids, triglycerides, and other lipids are commonly used for long-term energy storage. The hydrophobic character of lipids makes them a much more compact form of energy storage than hydrophilic carbohydrates. Gluconeogenesis permits glucose to be synthesized from various sources, including lipids.

In some animals (such as termites) and some microorganisms (such as protists and bacteria), cellulose can be disassembled during digestion and absorbed as glucose.

== Human diseases ==
- Diabetes mellitus
- Lactose intolerance
- Fructose malabsorption
- Galactosemia
- Glycogen storage disease

== See also ==
- Inborn errors of carbohydrate metabolism
- Hitting the wall (glycogen depletion)
- Second wind (increased ATP from fatty acids after glycogen depletion)
