= Chin =

Facial feature

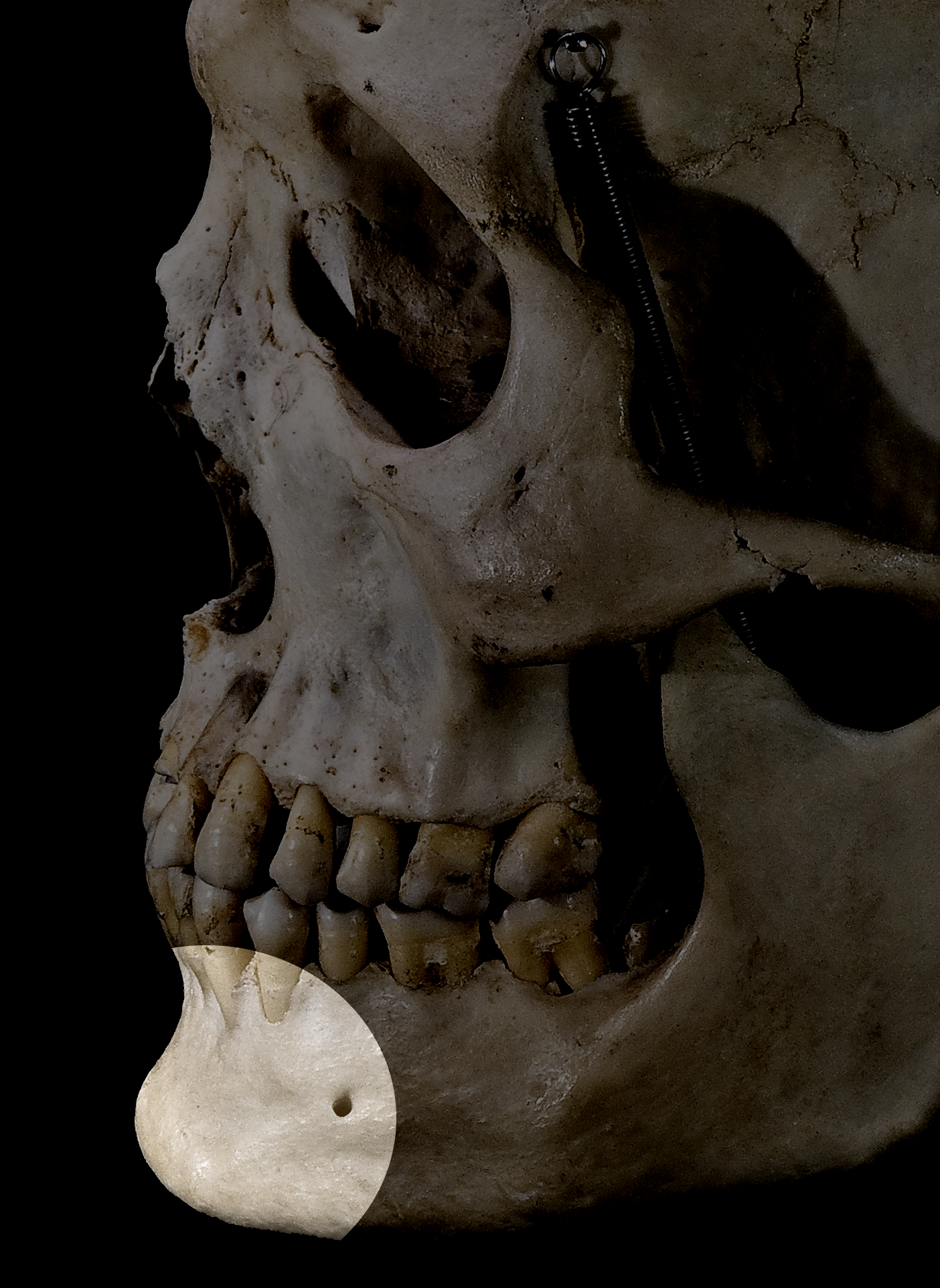
Photo highlighting the chin of a human skull

The chin is the forward pointed part of the anterior mandible (mental region) below the lower lip. A fully developed human skull has a chin of between 0.7 cm (0.28 in) and 1.1 cm (0.43 in).

== Evolution ==
The presence of a well-developed chin is considered to be one of the morphological characteristics of Homo sapiens that differentiates them from other human ancestors such as the closely related Neanderthals. Early human ancestors have varied symphysial morphology, but none of them have a well-developed chin. The origin of the chin is traditionally associated with the anterior–posterior breadth shortening of the dental arch or tooth row; however, its general mechanical or functional advantage during feeding, developmental origin, and link with human speech, physiology, and social influence are highly debated.

=== Functional perspectives ===
Louis Robinson (1913) suggests that the demand to resist masticatory stresses triggered bone thickening in the mental region of the mandible and ultimately formed a prominent chin. Moreover, David J. Daegling (1993) explains the chin as a functional adaptation to resist masticatory stress that causes vertical bending stresses in the coronal plane. Others have argued that the prominent chin is adapted to resisting wishboning forces, dorso-ventral shear forces, and generally a mechanical advantage to resist lateral transverse bending and vertical bending in the coronal plane. On the contrary, others have suggested that the presence of the chin is not related to mastication. The presence of thick bone in the relatively small mandible may indicate better force resistance capacity. However, the question stands of whether the chin is an adaptive or nonadaptive structure.

=== Developmental perspectives ===
In the 2010s, works on the morphological changes of the mandible during development have shown that the human chin, or at least the inverted-T shaped mental region, develops during the prenatal period, but the chin does not become prominent until the early postnatal period. This later modification happens by bone remodeling processes (bone resorption and bone deposition). Coquerelle et al. show that the anteriorly positioned cervical column of the spine and forward displacement of the hyoid bone limit the anterior–posterior breadth in the oral cavity for the tongue, laryngeal, and suprahyoid musculatures. Accordingly, this leads the upper parts of the mandible (alveolar process) to retract posteriorly, following the posterior movement of the upper tooth row, while the lower part of the symphysis remained protruded to create more space, thereby creating the inverted-T shaped mental relief during early ages and the prominent chin later. The alveolar region (upper or superior part of the symphysis) is sculpted by bone resorption, but the chin (lower or inferior part) is depository in its nature. These coordinated bone growth and modeling processes mold the vertical symphysis present at birth into the prominent shape of the chin.

Holton et al.'s 2015 research on the development of the chin suggests that the evolution of this unique characteristic was formed not by mechanical forces such as chewing but by evolutionary adaptations involving reduction in size and change in shape of the face. They claim that this adaptation occurred as the face became smaller compared to that of other ancient humans. The chin might also exist as an evolutionary spandrel, a remnant of other evolutionary selection pressures.

=== Other perspectives ===
Robert Franciscus takes a more anthropological viewpoint: he believes that the chin was formed as a consequence of the change in lifestyle humans underwent approximately 80,000 years ago. As humans' hunter-gatherer societies grew into larger social networks, territorial disputes decreased because the new social structure promoted building alliances in order to exchange goods and belief systems. Franciscus believes that this change in the human environment reduced hormone levels, especially in men, resulting in the natural evolution of the chin.

Overall, human beings are unique in the sense that they are the only species among primates who have chins. In the paper The Enduring Puzzle of the Human Chin, evolutionary anthropologists James Pampush and David Daegling discuss various theories that have been raised to solve the puzzle of the chin. They conclude that "each of the proposals we have discussed falter either empirically or theoretically; some fail, to a degree, on both accounts… This should serve as motivation, not discouragement, for researchers to continue investigating this modern human peculiarity… perhaps understanding the chin will reveal some unexpected insight into what it means to be human."

== Cleft chin ==
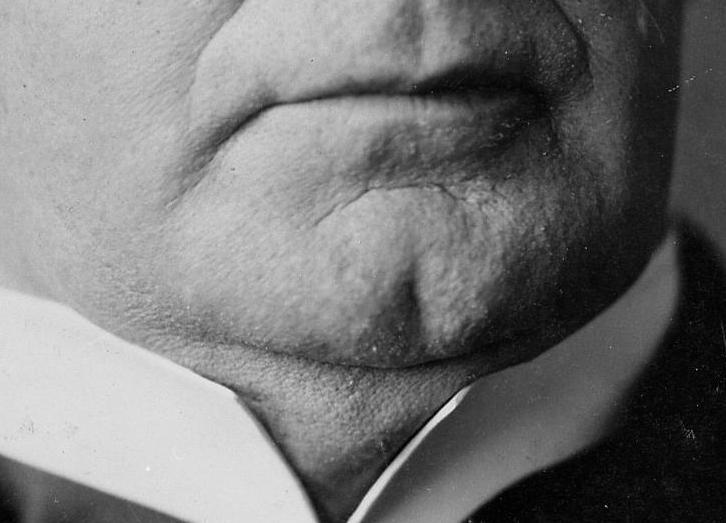
Example of a cleft chin (William McKinley)

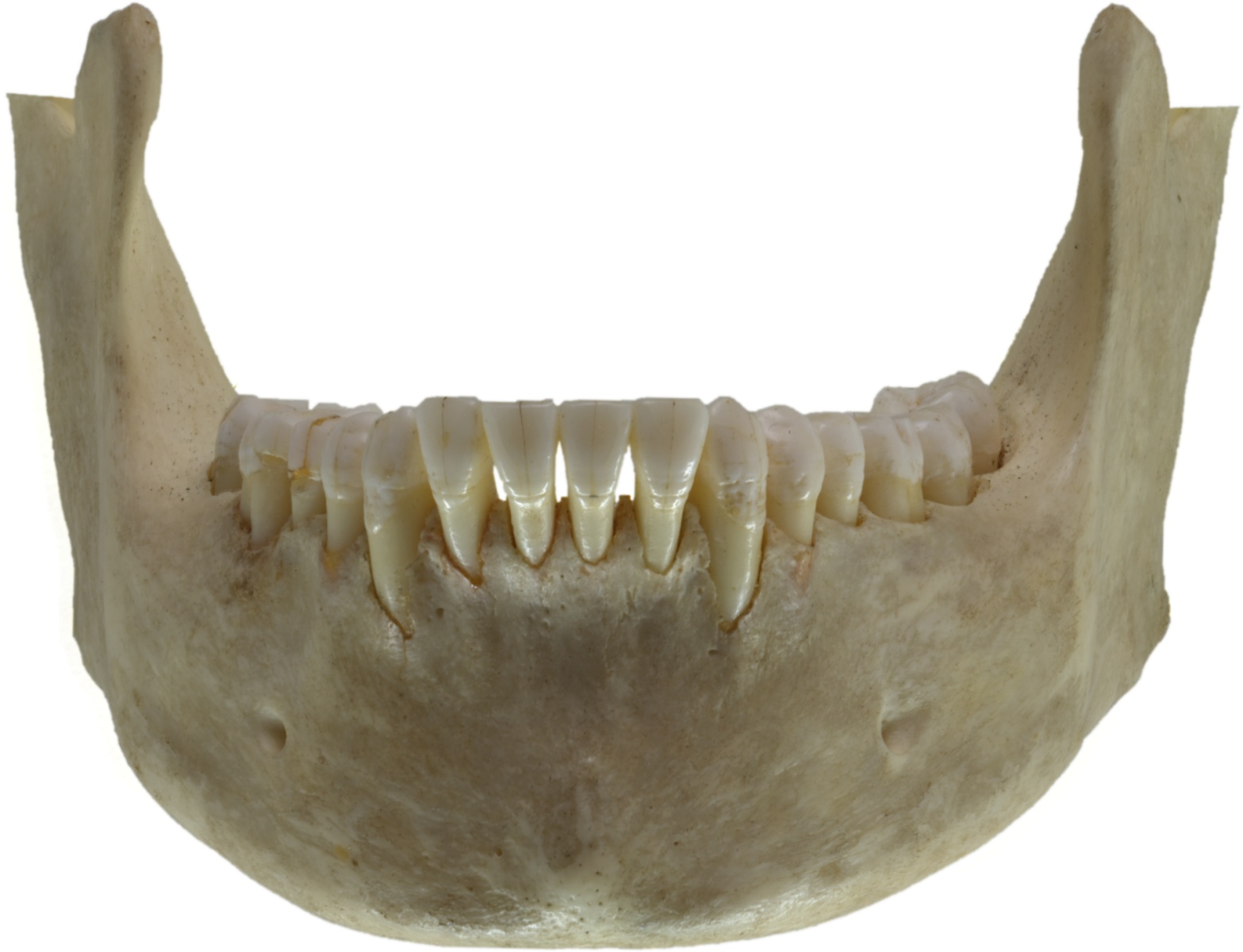
Human jaw front view

The terms cleft chin, chin cleft, dimple chin, or chin dimple refer to a dimple on the chin. It is a Y-shaped fissure on the chin with an underlying bony peculiarity. Specifically, the chin fissure follows the fissure in the lower jaw bone that resulted from the incomplete fusion of the left and right halves of the jaw bone, or muscle, during the embryonal and fetal development. It can also develop during the later mandibular symphysis, due to growth of the mental protuberance during puberty, or as a result of acromegaly. In some cases, one mental tubercle may grow more than another, which can cause facial asymmetry.

A cleft chin is an inherited trait in humans and can be influenced by many factors. The cleft chin is also a classic example of variable penetrance with environmental factors or a modifier gene possibly affecting the phenotypical expression of the actual genotype. Cleft chins can be presented in a child when neither parent presents a cleft chin. Cleft chins are common among people originating from Europe, the Middle East and South Asia.

There is a possible genetic cause for cleft chins, a genetic marker called rs11684042, which is located in chromosome 2.

In Persian literature, the chin dimple is considered a factor of beauty and is metaphorically referred to as "the chin pit" or "the chin well", a well in which the poor lover is fallen and trapped.

== Double chin ==
A double chin is a loss of definition of the jawbone or soft tissue under the chin. There are two possible causes for a double chin, which have to be differentiated.

In some overweight people, commonly the layer of subcutaneous fat around the neck sags down and creates a wrinkle, creating the appearance of a second chin. Sometimes, this fat pad is surgically removed and the corresponding muscles under the jaw shortened (hyoid lift). This is often a purely cosmetic procedure.

Another cause can be a bony deficiency, commonly seen in people of normal weight. When the jaw bones (mandible and by extension the maxilla) do not project forward enough, the chin in turn will not project forward enough to give the impression of a defined jawline and chin. Despite low amounts of fat in the area, it can appear as if the chin is melting into the neck. The extent of this deficiency can vary drastically and usually has to be treated surgically. In some patients, the aesthetic deficit can be overcome with genioplasty alone; in others, the lack of forward growth might warrant orthognathic surgery to move one or two jaws forward. If the patient suffers from sleep apnea, early maxillomandibular advancement is usually the only causal treatment and necessary to preserve normal life expectancy.

== See also ==
- Habsburg chin
- Masseter
- Otofacial syndrome
- Ptosis (chin)

== Further links ==
- von Cramon-Taubadel, Noreen; Scott, Jill E.; Robinson, Chris A.; Schroeder, Lauren (29 January 2026). "Is the Human Chin a Spandrel? Insights from an Evolutionary Analysis of Ape Craniomandibular Form". PLOS One. 21 (1) e0340278. Bibcode:2026PLoSO..2140278V. doi:10.1371/journal.pone.0340278. PMC 12854472. PMID 41610129.
