= Catabolysis =

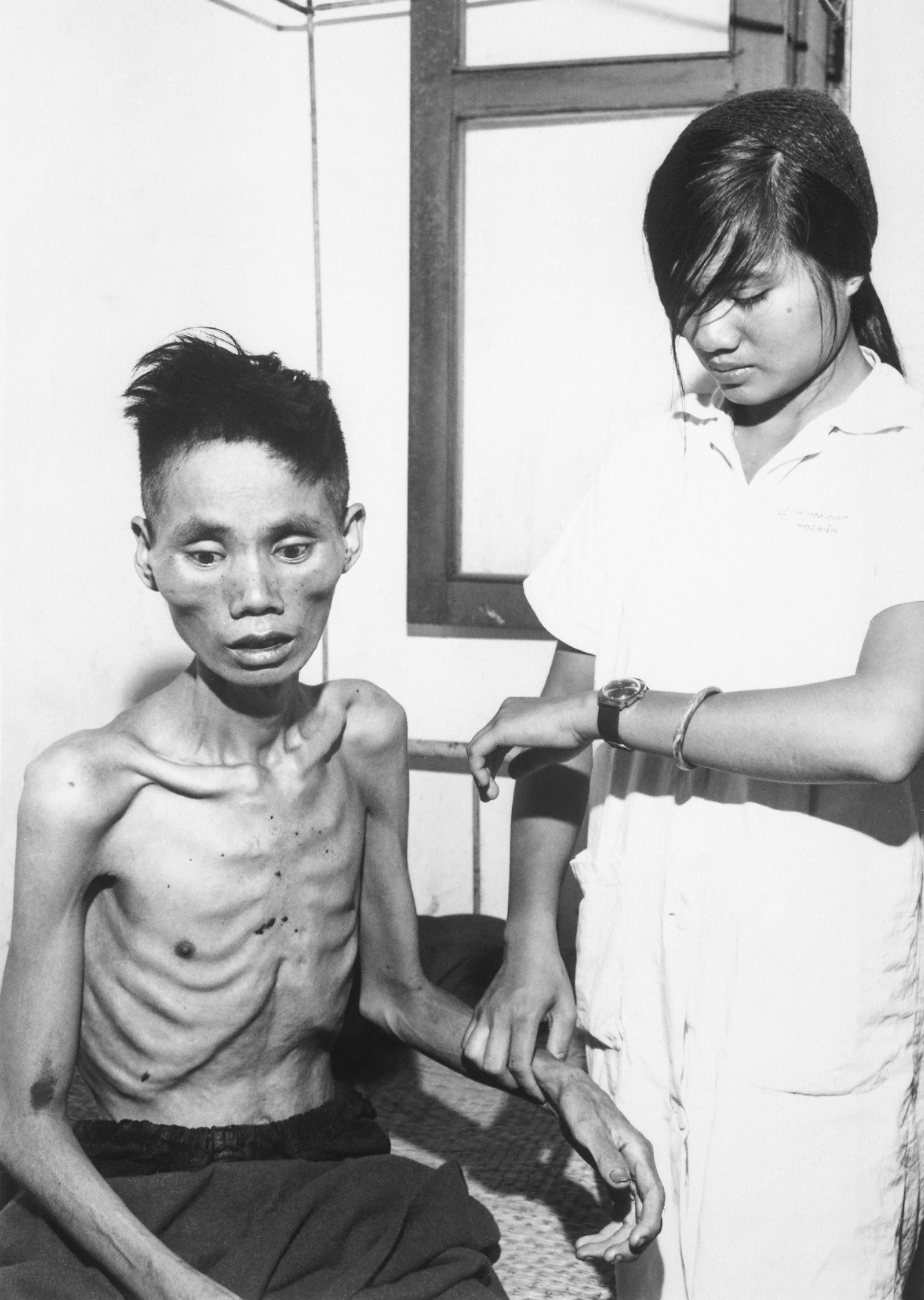
- A Vietnamese man, showing signs of starvation.
- Specialty: Endocrinology
- Causes: Malnutrition

Catabolysis is a biological process in which the body breaks down fat and muscle tissue in order to stay alive. Catabolysis occurs only when there is no longer any source of protein, carbohydrate, or vitamin nourishment feeding all body systems; it is the most severe type of malnutrition.

== Mechanism ==
Due to the normal metabolic rate of humans catabolysis becomes life-threatening only after 1–2 months from the cessation of nutrition going into the body. After this time, the damage to muscles and organs can be permanent and can also eventually cause death, if left untreated. Catabolysis is the last metabolic resort for the body to keep itself — particularly the nervous system—functional.

Protein stores, especially in muscle tissue, provide the amino acids needed for the process. Amino acids are released into the blood and converted in the liver to alpha keto acids. Alpha keto acids can then be converted to glucose to maintain proper blood sugar levels.

The situation can become dire when one begins to lose muscle mass; this is a sign that the fat has been expended and the body is now metabolizing the muscle tissue. This results in muscle atrophy, a loss of strength and, ultimately, a depletion of muscular tissue completely. Muscle weakness is not necessarily a symptom of catabolysis: the muscles will normally feel fatigued when they are not receiving enough energy or oxygen. Ultimately, catabolysis can progress to the point of no return when the body's machinery for protein synthesis, itself made of protein, has been degraded to the point that it cannot handle any protein. At this point, attempts to correct the disorder by giving food or protein are futile.

The body has a natural store of fat (also called adipose tissue) that stores reserve energy. One can still stay alive while the body breaks down the fatty tissue (hence people wasting away from starvation).

The person may, during catabolysis, have large amounts of lipids, proteins, and amino acids in the bloodstream, due to the muscle fibers and adipose tissues being broken down and sent to the nervous system and brain. One may also exhibit a fever, since the body is working hard to transfer the nutrients in the muscles and fat to the blood.

== Treatment ==
While catabolysis can be deadly over time, if the person is given medical treatment early enough, the effects of catabolysis can be reversed. However, the person may require intravenous nutrition, a blood transfusion, and/or oxygen replenishment. After that, it may be a few weeks to a few months before the person's muscle mass and fat deposits can build themselves up again; there is a possibility that they may never build back up, depending on the severity of the condition.

== See also ==
- Anorexia nervosa
- Conatus | Wiktionary
- Metabolism
- Starvation
- Superior mesenteric artery syndrome
- Wasting
