= FOXO6 =

Protein-coding gene in humans

Identifiers
- Aliases: FOXO6, forkhead box O6
- External IDs: OMIM: 611457; MGI: 2676586; GeneCards: FOXO6

Gene location (Human)
Chr.	Chromosome 1 (human)
Band	1p34.2	Start	41,361,922 bp
Band	1p34.2	End	41,383,590 bp

Gene location (Mouse)
Chr.	Chromosome 4 (mouse)
Band	4|4 D2.1	Start	120,124,276 bp
Band	4|4 D2.1	End	120,144,546 bp
RNA expression pattern
Bgee	Human / Mouse (ortholog); Top expressed in: ganglionic eminence; pituitary gland; anterior pituitary; testicle; muscle of thigh; right ovary; left ovary; left lobe of thyroid gland; body of uterus; placenta / Top expressed in: ganglionic eminence; Claustrum; ventricular zone; subdivision of hippocampus; quadriceps femoris muscle; nucleus accumbens; hippocampus proper; skeletal muscle tissue; cingulate gyrus; Region I of hippocampus proper; More reference expression data
BioGPS	n/a
Gene ontology
Molecular function	DNA binding; DNA-binding transcription factor activity; sequence-specific DNA binding
Cellular component	nucleus
Biological process	transcription, DNA-templated; regulation of transcription, DNA-templated
Sources:Amigo / QuickGO
Orthologs
Databases	NCBI: entry; OMA: entry
Species	Human	Mouse
Entrez	100132074	329934
Ensembl	ENSG00000204060; ENSG00000281518	ENSMUSG00000052135
UniProt	A0A1X9RU27	Q70KY4
RefSeq (mRNA)	NM_001291281	NM_194060
RefSeq (protein)	NP_001278210	NP_918949
Location (UCSC)	Chr 1: 41.36 – 41.38 Mb	Chr 4: 120.12 – 120.14 Mb
PubMed search
- Wikidata
View/Edit Human	View/Edit Mouse

Forkhead box O6 is a protein that in humans is encoded by the FOXO6 gene.

FoxO6 is expressed in the liver, skeletal muscle, and the hippocampus of the brain. In the liver, FoxO6 normally promotes gluconeogenesis in the fasted state, but insulin blocks Fox06 after feeding. In a condition of insulin resistance, insulin fails to block FoxO6, resulting in continued gluconeogenesis even after feeding.
