= Gluconeogenesis =

Biosynthesis of glucose molecules

Gluconeogenesis (GNG) is a metabolic pathway that results in the biosynthesis of glucose from certain non-carbohydrate carbon substrates. It is a ubiquitous process, present in plants, animals, fungi, bacteria, and other microorganisms. In vertebrates, gluconeogenesis occurs mainly in the liver and, to a lesser extent, in the cortex of the kidneys. It is one of two primary mechanisms – the other being degradation of glycogen (glycogenolysis) – used by humans and many other animals to maintain blood sugar levels, avoiding low levels (hypoglycemia). In ruminants, because dietary carbohydrates tend to be metabolized by rumen organisms, gluconeogenesis occurs regardless of fasting, low-carbohydrate diets, exercise, etc. In many other animals, the process occurs during periods of fasting, starvation, low-carbohydrate diets, or intense exercise.

In humans, substrates for gluconeogenesis may come from any non-carbohydrate sources that can be converted to pyruvate or intermediates of glycolysis (see figure). From the breakdown of proteins, these substrates include glucogenic amino acids (although not ketogenic amino acids); from breakdown of lipids (such as triglycerides), they include glycerol, odd-chain fatty acids (although not even-chain fatty acids, see below); and from other parts of metabolism that includes lactate from the Cori cycle. Under conditions of prolonged fasting, acetone derived from ketone bodies could potentially also serve as a substrate based on computer models. This could provide a pathway from fatty acids to glucose, but whether this actually happens in the human body is controversial. Although most gluconeogenesis occurs in the liver, the relative contribution of gluconeogenesis by the kidney is increased in diabetes and prolonged fasting.

The gluconeogenesis pathway is highly endergonic until it is coupled to the hydrolysis of ATP or GTP, effectively making the process exergonic. For example, the pathway leading from pyruvate to glucose-6-phosphate requires 4 molecules of ATP and 2 molecules of GTP to proceed spontaneously. These ATPs are supplied from fatty acid catabolism via beta oxidation.

== Precursors ==
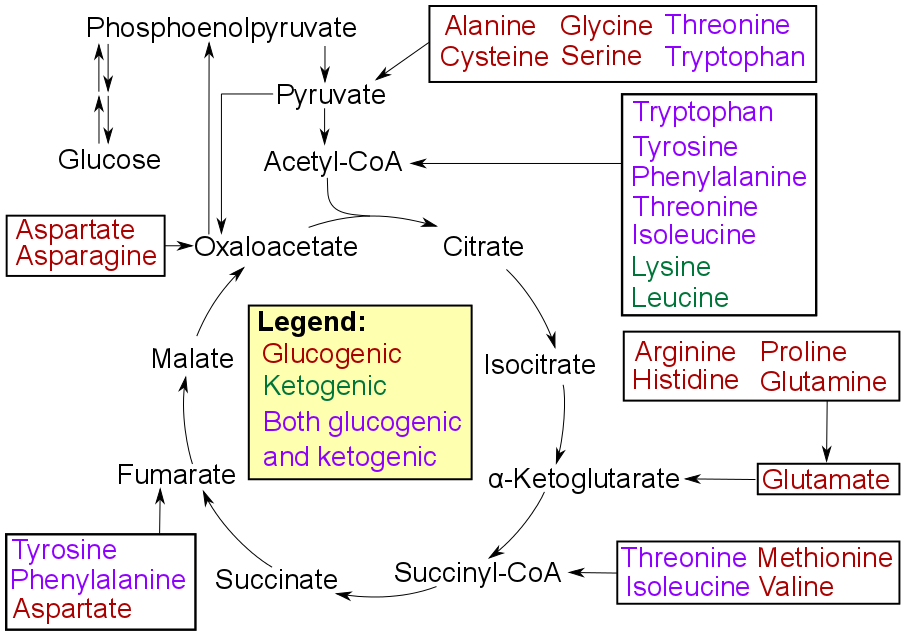
Catabolism of proteinogenic amino acids. Amino acids are classified according to the abilities of their products to enter gluconeogenesis: Glucogenic amino acids have this ability; Ketogenic amino acids do not. These products may still be used for ketogenesis or lipid synthesis.; Some amino acids are catabolized into both glucogenic and ketogenic products.

In humans the main gluconeogenic precursors are lactate, glycerol (which is a part of the triglyceride molecule), alanine and glutamine. Altogether, they account for over 90% of the overall gluconeogenesis. Other glucogenic amino acids and all citric acid cycle intermediates (through conversion to oxaloacetate) can also function as substrates for gluconeogenesis. Generally, human consumption of gluconeogenic substrates in food does not result in increased gluconeogenesis.

In ruminants, propionate is the principal gluconeogenic substrate. In nonruminants, including human beings, propionate arises from the β-oxidation of odd-chain and branched-chain fatty acids, and is a (relatively minor) substrate for gluconeogenesis.

Lactate is transported back to the liver where it is converted into pyruvate by the Cori cycle using the enzyme lactate dehydrogenase. Pyruvate, the first designated substrate of the gluconeogenic pathway, can then be used to generate glucose. Transamination or deamination of amino acids facilitates entering of their carbon skeleton into the cycle directly (as pyruvate or oxaloacetate), or indirectly via the citric acid cycle. The contribution of Cori cycle lactate to overall glucose production increases with fasting duration. Specifically, after 12, 20, and 40 hours of fasting by human volunteers, the contribution of Cori cycle lactate to gluconeogenesis was 41%, 71%, and 92%, respectively.

Whether even-chain fatty acids can be converted into glucose in animals has been a longstanding question in biochemistry. Odd-chain fatty acids can be oxidized to yield acetyl-CoA and propionyl-CoA, the latter serving as a precursor to succinyl-CoA, which can be converted to oxaloacetate and enter into gluconeogenesis. In contrast, even-chain fatty acids are oxidized to yield only acetyl-CoA, whose entry into gluconeogenesis requires the presence of a glyoxylate cycle (also known as glyoxylate shunt) to produce four-carbon dicarboxylic acid precursors. The glyoxylate shunt comprises two enzymes, malate synthase and isocitrate lyase, and is present in fungi, plants, and bacteria. Despite some reports of glyoxylate shunt enzymatic activities detected in animal tissues, genes encoding both enzymatic functions have only been found in nematodes, in which they exist as a single bi-functional enzyme. Genes coding for malate synthase alone (but not isocitrate lyase) have been identified in other animals including arthropods, echinoderms, and even some vertebrates. Mammals found to possess the malate synthase gene include monotremes (platypus) and marsupials (opossum), but not placental mammals.

The existence of the glyoxylate cycle in humans has not been established, and it is widely held that fatty acids cannot be converted to glucose in humans directly. Carbon-14 has been shown to end up in glucose when it is supplied in fatty acids, but this can be expected from the incorporation of labelled atoms derived from acetyl-CoA into citric acid cycle intermediates which are interchangeable with those derived from other physiological sources, such as glucogenic amino acids. In the absence of other glucogenic sources, the 2-carbon acetyl-CoA derived from the oxidation of fatty acids cannot produce a net yield of glucose via the citric acid cycle, since an equivalent two carbon atoms are released as carbon dioxide during the cycle. During ketosis, however, acetyl-CoA from fatty acids yields ketone bodies, including acetone, and up to ~60% of acetone may be oxidized in the liver to the pyruvate precursors acetol and methylglyoxal. Thus ketone bodies derived from fatty acids could account for up to 11% of gluconeogenesis during starvation. Catabolism of fatty acids also produces energy in the form of ATP that is necessary for the gluconeogenesis pathway.

== Bodily location ==
In mammals, gluconeogenesis has been believed to be restricted to the liver, the kidney, the intestine, and muscle, but recent evidence indicates gluconeogenesis occurring in astrocytes of the brain. These organs use somewhat different gluconeogenic precursors. The liver preferentially uses lactate, glycerol, and glucogenic amino acids (especially alanine) while the kidney preferentially uses lactate, glutamine and glycerol. Lactate from the Cori cycle is quantitatively the largest source of substrate for gluconeogenesis, especially for the kidney. The liver uses both glycogenolysis and gluconeogenesis to produce glucose, whereas the kidney only uses gluconeogenesis. After a meal, the liver shifts to glycogen synthesis, whereas the kidney increases gluconeogenesis. The intestine uses mostly glutamine and glycerol.

Propionate is the principal substrate for gluconeogenesis in the ruminant liver, and the ruminant liver may make increased use of gluconeogenic amino acids (e.g., alanine) when glucose demand is increased. The capacity of liver cells to use lactate for gluconeogenesis declines from the preruminant stage to the ruminant stage in calves and lambs. In sheep kidney tissue, very high rates of gluconeogenesis from propionate have been observed.

In all species, the formation of oxaloacetate from pyruvate and TCA cycle intermediates is restricted to the mitochondrion, and the enzymes that convert phosphoenolpyruvic acid (PEP) to glucose-6-phosphate are found in the cytosol. The location of the enzyme that links these two parts of gluconeogenesis by converting oxaloacetate to PEP – PEP carboxykinase (PEPCK) – is variable by species: it can be found entirely within the mitochondria, entirely within the cytosol, or dispersed evenly between the two, as it is in humans. Transport of PEP across the mitochondrial membrane is accomplished by dedicated transport proteins; however no such proteins exist for oxaloacetate. Therefore, in species that lack intra-mitochondrial PEPCK, oxaloacetate must be converted into malate or aspartate, exported from the mitochondrion, and converted back into oxaloacetate in order to allow gluconeogenesis to continue.

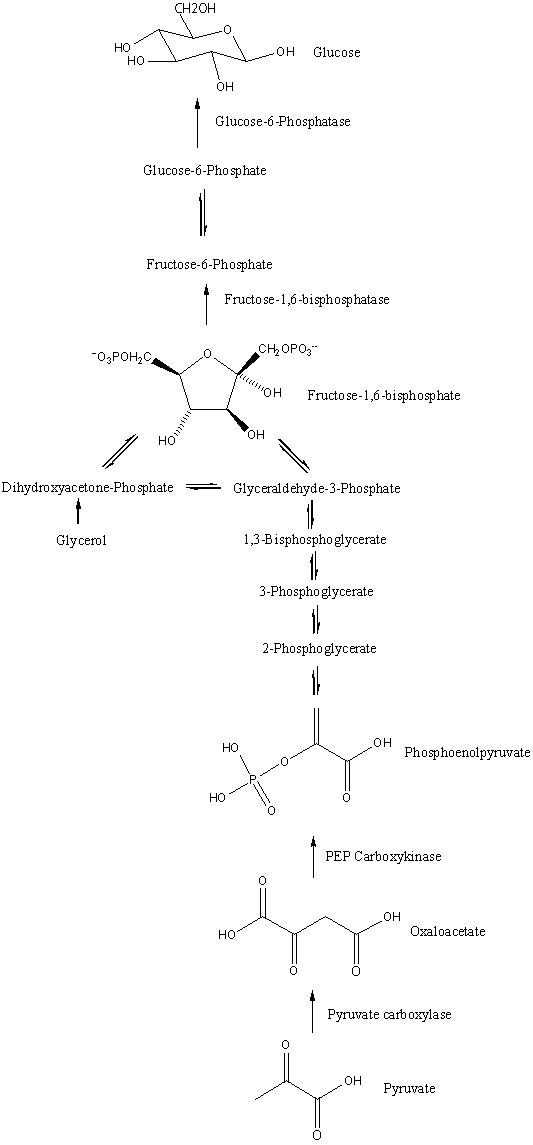
Gluconeogenesis pathway with key molecules and enzymes. Many steps are the opposite of those found in the glycolysis.

== Pathway ==
Gluconeogenesis is a pathway consisting of a series of eleven enzyme-catalyzed reactions. The pathway will begin in either the liver or kidney, in the mitochondria or cytoplasm of those cells, this being dependent on the substrate being used. Many of the reactions are the reverse of steps found in glycolysis.

- Gluconeogenesis begins in the mitochondria with the formation of oxaloacetate by the carboxylation of pyruvate. This reaction also requires one molecule of ATP, and is catalyzed by pyruvate carboxylase. This enzyme is stimulated by high levels of acetyl-CoA (produced in β-oxidation in the liver) and inhibited by high levels of ADP and glucose.
- Oxaloacetate is reduced to malate using NADH, a step required for its transportation out of the mitochondria.
- Malate is oxidized to oxaloacetate using NAD^{+} in the cytosol, where the remaining steps of gluconeogenesis take place.
- Oxaloacetate is decarboxylated and then phosphorylated to form phosphoenolpyruvate using the enzyme PEPCK. A molecule of GTP is hydrolyzed to GDP during this reaction.
- The next steps in the reaction are the same as reversed glycolysis. However, fructose 1,6-bisphosphatase converts fructose 1,6-bisphosphate to fructose 6-phosphate, using one water molecule and releasing one phosphate (in glycolysis, phosphofructokinase 1 converts F6P and ATP to F1,6BP and ADP). This is also the rate-limiting step of gluconeogenesis.
- Glucose-6-phosphate is formed from fructose 6-phosphate by phosphoglucoisomerase (the reverse of step 2 in glycolysis). Glucose-6-phosphate can be used in other metabolic pathways or dephosphorylated to free glucose. Whereas free glucose can easily diffuse in and out of the cell, the phosphorylated form (glucose-6-phosphate) is locked in the cell, a mechanism by which intracellular glucose levels are controlled by cells.
- The final step in gluconeogenesis, the formation of glucose, occurs in the lumen of the endoplasmic reticulum, where glucose-6-phosphate is hydrolyzed by glucose-6-phosphatase to produce glucose and release an inorganic phosphate. Like two steps prior, this step is not a simple reversal of glycolysis, in which hexokinase catalyzes the conversion of glucose and ATP into G6P and ADP. Glucose is shuttled into the cytoplasm by glucose transporters located in the endoplasmic reticulum's membrane.

Metabolism of common monosaccharides, including glycolysis, gluconeogenesis, glycogenesis and glycogenolysis

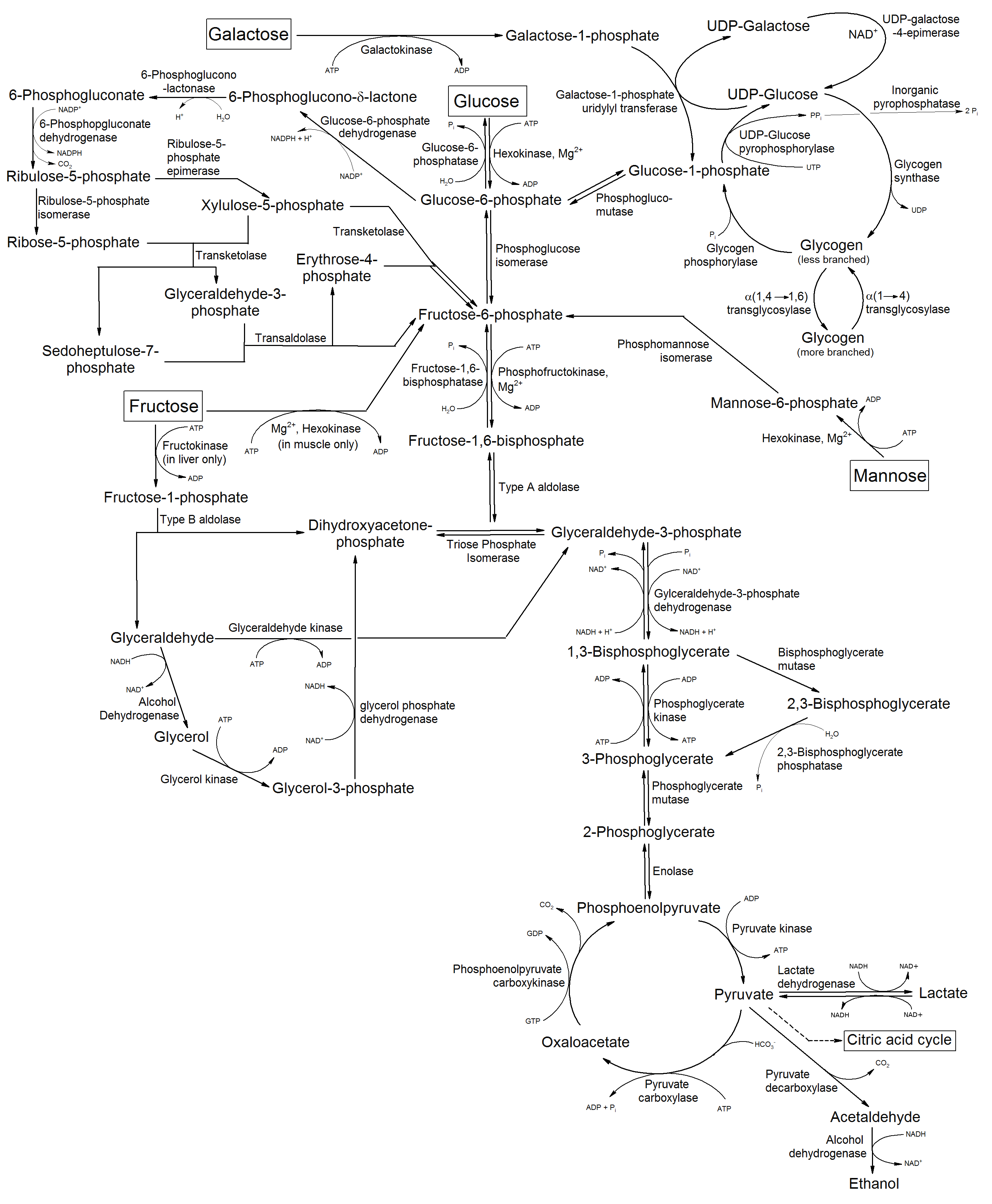

== Regulation ==
While most steps in gluconeogenesis are the reverse of those found in glycolysis, three regulated and strongly endergonic reactions are replaced with more kinetically favorable reactions. Hexokinase/glucokinase, phosphofructokinase, and pyruvate kinase enzymes of glycolysis are replaced with glucose-6-phosphatase, fructose-1,6-bisphosphatase, and PEP carboxykinase/pyruvate carboxylase. These enzymes are typically regulated by similar molecules, but with opposite results. For example, acetyl CoA and citrate activate gluconeogenesis enzymes (pyruvate carboxylase and fructose-1,6-bisphosphatase, respectively), while at the same time inhibiting the glycolytic enzyme pyruvate kinase. This system of reciprocal control allow glycolysis and gluconeogenesis to inhibit each other and prevents a futile cycle of synthesizing glucose to only break it down. Pyruvate kinase can be also bypassed by 86 pathways not related to gluconeogenesis, for the purpose of forming pyruvate and subsequently lactate; some of these pathways use carbon atoms originated from glucose.

The majority of the enzymes responsible for gluconeogenesis are found in the cytosol; the exceptions are mitochondrial pyruvate carboxylase and, in animals, phosphoenolpyruvate carboxykinase. The latter exists as an isozyme located in both the mitochondrion and the cytosol. The rate of gluconeogenesis is ultimately controlled by the action of the enzyme fructose-1,6-bisphosphatase, which is also regulated through signal transduction by cAMP and its phosphorylation.

Global control of gluconeogenesis is mediated by glucagon (released when blood glucose is low); it triggers phosphorylation of enzymes and regulatory proteins by Protein Kinase A (a cyclic AMP regulated kinase) resulting in inhibition of glycolysis and stimulation of gluconeogenesis. Insulin counteracts glucagon by inhibiting gluconeogenesis. Type 2 diabetes is marked by excess glucagon and insulin resistance from the body. Insulin can no longer inhibit the gene expression of enzymes such as PEPCK which leads to increased levels of hyperglycemia in the body. The anti-diabetic drug metformin reduces blood glucose primarily through inhibition of gluconeogenesis, overcoming the failure of insulin to inhibit gluconeogenesis due to insulin resistance.

Studies have shown that the absence of hepatic glucose production has no major effect on the control of fasting plasma glucose concentration. Compensatory induction of gluconeogenesis occurs in the kidneys and intestine, driven by glucagon, glucocorticoids, and acidosis.

== Insulin resistance ==
In the liver, the FOX protein FOXO6 normally promotes gluconeogenesis in the fasted state, but insulin blocks FOXO6 upon feeding. In a condition of insulin resistance, insulin fails to block FOXO6 resulting in continued gluconeogenesis even upon feeding, resulting in high blood glucose (hyperglycemia).

Insulin resistance is a common feature of metabolic syndrome and type 2 diabetes. For this reason, gluconeogenesis is a target of therapy for type 2 diabetes, such as the antidiabetic drug metformin, which inhibits gluconeogenic glucose formation, and stimulates glucose uptake by cells.

== Origins ==
Gluconeogenesis is considered one of the most ancient anabolic pathways and is likely to have been exhibited in the last universal common ancestor. Rafael F. Say and Georg Fuchs stated in 2010 that "all archaeal groups as well as the deeply branching bacterial lineages contain a bifunctional fructose 1,6-bisphosphate (FBP) aldolase/phosphatase with both FBP aldolase and FBP phosphatase activity. This enzyme is missing in most other Bacteria and in Eukaryota, and is heat-stabile even in mesophilic marine Crenarchaeota". It is proposed that fructose 1,6-bisphosphate aldolase/phosphatase was an ancestral gluconeogenic enzyme and had preceded glycolysis. However, a prebiotic glycolysis would follow the same chemical mechanisms as gluconeogenesis, due to microscopic reversibility, and in this view would have occurred at the same time. Fructose 1,6-bisphosphate is shown to be nonenzymatically synthesized within a freezing solution. The synthesis is accelerated in the presence of amino acids such as glycine and lysine. Some of the other reactions of gluconeogenesis can also proceed nonenzymatically. Such chemistry could have occurred in hydrothermal environments, including temperature gradients and cycling of freezing and thawing. Mineral surfaces might have played a role in the phosphorylation of metabolic intermediates from gluconeogenesis and have been shown to produce tetrose, hexose phosphates, and pentose from formaldehyde, glyceraldehyde, and glycolaldehyde.

== See also ==
- Bioenergetics
