= Proteinogenic amino acid =

Amino acid that is incorporated biosynthetically into proteins during translation

Proteinogenic amino acids are a small fraction of all amino acids

Proteinogenic amino acids are amino acids that are incorporated biosynthetically into proteins during translation from RNA. The word "proteinogenic" means "protein creating". Throughout known life, there are 22 genetically encoded (proteinogenic) amino acids, 20 in the standard genetic code and an additional 2 (selenocysteine and pyrrolysine) that can be incorporated by special translation mechanisms.

In contrast, non-proteinogenic amino acids are amino acids that are either not incorporated into proteins (like GABA, L-DOPA, or triiodothyronine), misincorporated in place of a genetically encoded amino acid, or not produced directly and in isolation by standard cellular machinery (like hydroxyproline). The latter often results from post-translational modification of proteins. Some non-proteinogenic amino acids are incorporated into nonribosomal peptides which are synthesized by non-ribosomal peptide synthetases.

Both eukaryotes and prokaryotes can incorporate selenocysteine into their proteins via a nucleotide sequence known as a SECIS element, which directs the cell to translate a nearby UGA codon as selenocysteine (UGA is normally a stop codon). In some methanogenic prokaryotes, the UAG codon (normally a stop codon) can also be translated to pyrrolysine.

In eukaryotes, there are only 21 proteinogenic amino acids, the 20 of the standard genetic code, plus selenocysteine. Humans can synthesize 12 of these from each other or from other molecules of intermediary metabolism. The other nine must be consumed (usually as their protein derivatives), and so they are called essential amino acids. The essential amino acids are histidine, isoleucine, leucine, lysine, methionine, phenylalanine, threonine, tryptophan, and valine (i.e. H, I, L, K, M, F, T, W, V).

The proteinogenic amino acids have been found to be related to the set of amino acids that can be recognized by ribozyme autoaminoacylation systems. Thus, non-proteinogenic amino acids would have been excluded by the contingent evolutionary success of nucleotide-based life forms. Other reasons have been offered to explain why certain specific non-proteinogenic amino acids are not generally incorporated into proteins; for example, ornithine and homoserine cyclize against the peptide backbone and fragment the protein with relatively short half-lives, while others are toxic because they can be mistakenly incorporated into proteins, such as the arginine analog canavanine.

The evolutionary selection of certain proteinogenic amino acids from the primordial soup has been suggested to be because of their better incorporation into a polypeptide chain as opposed to non-proteinogenic amino acids.

== Structures ==
The following illustrates the structures and abbreviations of the 21 amino acids that are directly encoded for protein synthesis by the genetic code of eukaryotes. The structures given below are standard chemical structures, not the typical zwitterion forms that exist in aqueous solutions.

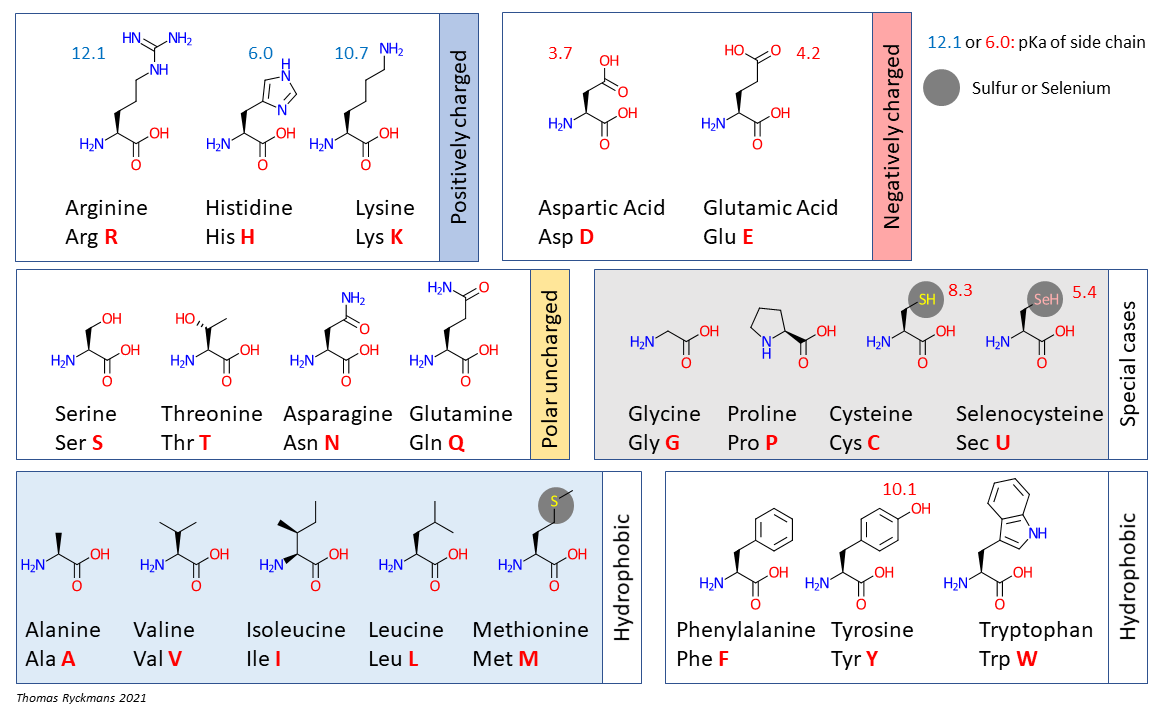
Structure of the 21 proteinogenic amino acids with 3 and 1 letters codes, grouped by side chain functionality

L-Alanine
(Ala / A)

L-Arginine
(Arg / R)

L-Asparagine
(Asn / N)

L-Aspartic acid
(Asp / D)

L-Cysteine
(Cys / C)

L-Glutamic acid
(Glu / E)

L-Glutamine
(Gln / Q)

Glycine
(Gly / G)

L-Histidine
(His / H)

L-Isoleucine
(Ile / I)

L-Leucine
(Leu / L)

L-Lysine
(Lys / K)

L-Methionine
(Met / M)

L-Phenylalanine
(Phe / F)

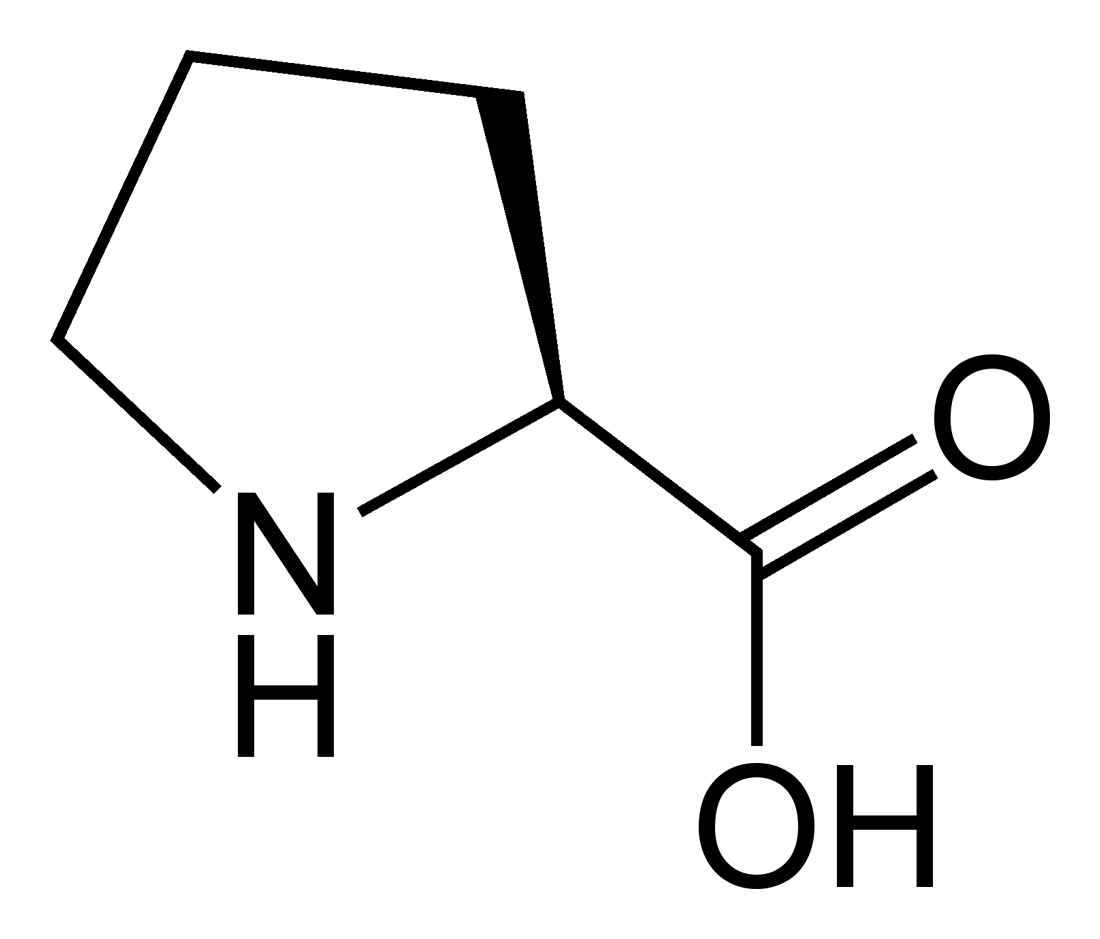
L-Proline
(Pro / P)

L-Serine
(Ser / S)

L-Threonine
(Thr / T)

L-Tryptophan
(Trp / W)

L-Tyrosine
(Tyr / Y)

L-Valine
(Val / V)

IUPAC/IUBMB now also recommends standard abbreviations for the following two amino acids:

L-Selenocysteine
(Sec / U)

L-Pyrrolysine
(Pyl / O)

== Chemical properties ==
Following is a table listing the one-letter symbols, the three-letter symbols, and the chemical properties of the side chains of the standard amino acids. The masses listed are based on weighted averages of the elemental isotopes at their natural abundances. Forming a peptide bond results in elimination of a molecule of water. Therefore, the protein's mass is equal to the mass of amino acids the protein is composed of minus 18.01524 Da per peptide bond.

=== General chemical properties ===
Amino acid	Short	Abbrev.	Avg. mass (Da)	pI	pK_{1} (α-COO^{−})	pK_{2} (α-NH_{3}^{+})
Alanine	A	Ala	89.09404	6.01	2.35	9.87
Cysteine	C	Cys	121.15404	5.05	1.92	10.70
Aspartic acid	D	Asp	133.10384	2.85	1.99	9.90
Glutamic acid	E	Glu	147.13074	3.15	2.10	9.47
Phenylalanine	F	Phe	165.19184	5.49	2.20	9.31
Glycine	G	Gly	75.06714	6.06	2.35	9.78
Histidine	H	His	155.15634	7.60	1.80	9.33
Isoleucine	I	Ile	131.17464	6.05	2.32	9.76
Lysine	K	Lys	146.18934	9.60	2.16	9.06
Leucine	L	Leu	131.17464	6.01	2.33	9.74
Methionine	M	Met	149.20784	5.74	2.13	9.28
Asparagine	N	Asn	132.11904	5.41	2.14	8.72
Pyrrolysine	O	Pyl	255.31	?	?	?
Proline	P	Pro	115.13194	6.30	1.95	10.64
Glutamine	Q	Gln	146.14594	5.65	2.17	9.13
Arginine	R	Arg	174.20274	10.76	1.82	8.99
Serine	S	Ser	105.09344	5.68	2.19	9.21
Threonine	T	Thr	119.12034	5.60	2.09	9.10
Selenocysteine	U	Sec	168.053	5.47	1.91	10
Valine	V	Val	117.14784	6.00	2.39	9.74
Tryptophan	W	Trp	204.22844	5.89	2.46	9.41
Tyrosine	Y	Tyr	181.19124	5.64	2.20	9.21

=== Side-chain properties ===
Amino acid	Short	Abbrev.	Side chain	Hydro- phobic	pKa^{§}	Polar	pH	Small	Tiny	Aromatic or Aliphatic	van der Waals volume (Å^{3})
Alanine	A	Ala	-CH_{3}	Yes	-	No	-	Yes	Yes	Aliphatic	67
Cysteine	C	Cys	-CH_{2}SH	Yes	8.55	Yes	acidic	Yes	Yes	-	86
Aspartic acid	D	Asp	-CH_{2}C(O)OH	No	3.67	Yes	acidic	Yes	No	-	91
Glutamic acid	E	Glu	-CH_{2}CH_{2}C(O)OH	No	4.25	Yes	acidic	No	No	-	109
Phenylalanine	F	Phe	-CH_{2}C_{6}H_{5}	Yes	-	No	-	No	No	Aromatic	135
Glycine	G	Gly	-H	Yes	-	No	-	Yes	Yes	-	48
Histidine	H	His	-CH_{2}-C_{3}H_{3}N_{2}	No	6.54	Yes	weak basic	No	No	Aromatic	118
Isoleucine	I	Ile	-CH(CH_{3})CH_{2}CH_{3}	Yes	-	No	-	No	No	Aliphatic	124
Lysine	K	Lys	-(CH_{2})_{4}NH_{2}	No	10.40	Yes	basic	No	No	-	135
Leucine	L	Leu	-CH_{2}CH(CH_{3})_{2}	Yes	-	No	-	No	No	Aliphatic	124
Methionine	M	Met	-CH_{2}CH_{2}SCH_{3}	Yes	-	No	-	No	No	Aliphatic	124
Asparagine	N	Asn	-CH_{2}C(O)NH_{2}	No	-	Yes	-	Yes	No	-	96
Pyrrolysine	O	Pyl	-(CH_{2})_{4}NHCOC_{4}H_{5}NCH_{3}	No	N.D.	Yes	weak basic	No	No	-	?
Proline	P	Pro	-CH_{2}CH_{2}CH_{2}-	Yes	-	No	-	Yes	No	-	90
Glutamine	Q	Gln	-CH_{2}CH_{2}C(O)NH_{2}	No	-	Yes	-	No	No	-	114
Arginine	R	Arg	-(CH_{2})_{3}NH-C(NH)NH_{2}	No	12.3	Yes	strongly basic	No	No	-	148
Serine	S	Ser	-CH_{2}OH	No	-	Yes	-	Yes	Yes	-	73
Threonine	T	Thr	-CH(OH)CH_{3}	No	-	Yes	-	Yes	No	-	93
Selenocysteine	U	Sec	-CH_{2}SeH	No	5.43	No	acidic	Yes	Yes	-	?
Valine	V	Val	-CH(CH_{3})_{2}	Yes	-	No	-	Yes	No	Aliphatic	105
Tryptophan	W	Trp	-CH_{2}C_{8}H_{6}N	Yes	-	No	-	No	No	Aromatic	163
Tyrosine	Y	Tyr	-CH_{2}-C_{6}H_{4}OH	No	9.84	Yes	weak acidic	No	No	Aromatic	141

§: Only ionizable residues have a meaningful pKa. Values for Asp, Cys, Glu, His, Lys & Tyr were determined using the amino acid residue placed centrally in an alanine pentapeptide. The value for Arg is from Pace et al. (2009). The value for Sec is from Byun & Kang (2011).

Note: the pKa value of an amino-acid residue in a small peptide is typically slightly different when it is inside a protein. Protein pKa calculations are sometimes used to calculate the change in the pKa value of an amino-acid residue in this situation.

=== Gene expression and biochemistry ===
Amino acid	Short	Abbrev.	Codon(s)	Occurrence				Essential‡ in humans
Amino acid	Short	Abbrev.	Codon(s)	in Archaean proteins (%)&	in Bacteria proteins (%)&	in Eukaryote proteins (%)&	in human proteins (%)&	Essential‡ in humans
Alanine	A	Ala	GCU, GCC, GCA, GCG	8.2	10.06	7.63	7.01	No
Cysteine	C	Cys	UGU, UGC	0.98	0.94	1.76	2.3	Conditionally
Aspartic acid	D	Asp	GAU, GAC	6.21	5.59	5.4	4.73	No
Glutamic acid	E	Glu	GAA, GAG	7.69	6.15	6.42	7.09	Conditionally
Phenylalanine	F	Phe	UUU, UUC	3.86	3.89	3.87	3.65	Yes
Glycine	G	Gly	GGU, GGC, GGA, GGG	7.58	7.76	6.33	6.58	Conditionally
Histidine	H	His	CAU, CAC	1.77	2.06	2.44	2.63	Yes
Isoleucine	I	Ile	AUU, AUC, AUA	7.03	5.89	5.1	4.33	Yes
Lysine	K	Lys	AAA, AAG	5.27	4.68	5.64	5.72	Yes
Leucine	L	Leu	UUA, UUG, CUU, CUC, CUA, CUG	9.31	10.09	9.29	9.97	Yes
Methionine	M	Met	AUG	2.35	2.38	2.25	2.13	Yes
Asparagine	N	Asn	AAU, AAC	3.68	3.58	4.28	3.58	No
Pyrrolysine	O	Pyl	UAG*	0	0	0	0	No
Proline	P	Pro	CCU, CCC, CCA, CCG	4.26	4.61	5.41	6.31	No
Glutamine	Q	Gln	CAA, CAG	2.38	3.58	4.21	4.77	No
Arginine	R	Arg	CGU, CGC, CGA, CGG, AGA, AGG	5.51	5.88	5.71	5.64	Conditionally
Serine	S	Ser	UCU, UCC, UCA, UCG, AGU, AGC	6.17	5.85	8.34	8.33	No
Threonine	T	Thr	ACU, ACC, ACA, ACG	5.44	5.52	5.56	5.36	Yes
Selenocysteine	U	Sec	UGA**	0	0	0	>0	No
Valine	V	Val	GUU, GUC, GUA, GUG	7.8	7.27	6.2	5.96	Yes
Tryptophan	W	Trp	UGG	1.03	1.27	1.24	1.22	Yes
Tyrosine	Y	Tyr	UAU, UAC	3.35	2.94	2.87	2.66	Conditionally
Stop codon†	-	Term	UAA, UAG, UGA††	?	?	?	—N/a	—N/a

* UAG is normally the amber stop codon, but in organisms containing the biological machinery encoded by the pylTSBCD cluster of genes the amino acid pyrrolysine will be incorporated.
** UGA is normally the opal (or umber) stop codon, but encodes selenocysteine if a SECIS element is present.
† The stop codon is not an amino acid, but is included for completeness.
†† UAG and UGA do not always act as stop codons (see above).
‡ An essential amino acid cannot be synthesized in humans and must, therefore, be supplied in the diet. Conditionally essential amino acids are not normally required in the diet, but must be supplied exogenously to specific populations that do not synthesize it in adequate amounts.
& Occurrence of amino acids is based on 135 Archaea, 3775 Bacteria, 614 Eukaryota proteomes and human proteome (21 006 proteins) respectively.

=== Mass spectrometry ===
In mass spectrometry of peptides and proteins, knowledge of the masses of the residues is useful. The mass of the peptide or protein is the sum of the residue masses plus the mass of water (Monoisotopic mass = 18.01056 Da; average mass = 18.0153 Da). The residue masses are calculated from the tabulated chemical formulas and atomic weights. In mass spectrometry, ions may also include one or more protons (Monoisotopic mass = 1.00728 Da; average mass* = 1.0074 Da). *Protons cannot have an average mass, this confusingly infers to Deuterons as a valid isotope, but they should be a different species (see Hydron (chemistry))

Amino acid	Short	Abbrev.	Formula	Mon. mass§ (Da)	Avg. mass (Da)
Alanine	A	Ala	C_{3}H_{5}NO	71.03711	71.0779
Cysteine	C	Cys	C_{3}H_{5}NOS	103.00919	103.1429
Aspartic acid	D	Asp	C_{4}H_{5}NO_{3}	115.02694	115.0874
Glutamic acid	E	Glu	C_{5}H_{7}NO_{3}	129.04259	129.1140
Phenylalanine	F	Phe	C_{9}H_{9}NO	147.06841	147.1739
Glycine	G	Gly	C_{2}H_{3}NO	57.02146	57.0513
Histidine	H	His	C_{6}H_{7}N_{3}O	137.05891	137.1393
Isoleucine	I	Ile	C_{6}H_{11}NO	113.08406	113.1576
Lysine	K	Lys	C_{6}H_{12}N_{2}O	128.09496	128.1723
Leucine	L	Leu	C_{6}H_{11}NO	113.08406	113.1576
Methionine	M	Met	C_{5}H_{9}NOS	131.04049	131.1961
Asparagine	N	Asn	C_{4}H_{6}N_{2}O_{2}	114.04293	114.1026
Pyrrolysine	O	Pyl	C_{12}H_{19}N_{3}O_{2}	237.14773	237.2982
Proline	P	Pro	C_{5}H_{7}NO	97.05276	97.1152
Glutamine	Q	Gln	C_{5}H_{8}N_{2}O_{2}	128.05858	128.1292
Arginine	R	Arg	C_{6}H_{12}N_{4}O	156.10111	156.1857
Serine	S	Ser	C_{3}H_{5}NO_{2}	87.03203	87.0773
Threonine	T	Thr	C_{4}H_{7}NO_{2}	101.04768	101.1039
Selenocysteine	U	Sec	C_{3}H_{5}NOSe	150.95364	150.0489
Valine	V	Val	C_{5}H_{9}NO	99.06841	99.1311
Tryptophan	W	Trp	C_{11}H_{10}N_{2}O	186.07931	186.2099
Tyrosine	Y	Tyr	C_{9}H_{9}NO_{2}	163.06333	163.1733

§ Monoisotopic mass

=== Stoichiometry and metabolic cost in cell ===
The table below lists the abundance of amino acids in E.coli cells and the metabolic cost (ATP) for synthesis of the amino acids. Negative numbers indicate the metabolic processes are energy favorable and do not cost net ATP of the cell. The abundance of amino acids includes amino acids in free form and in polymerization form (proteins).

Amino acid	Short	Abbrev.	Abundance (# of molecules (×10^{8}) per E. coli cell)	ATP cost in synthesis	
Amino acid	Short	Abbrev.	Abundance (# of molecules (×10^{8}) per E. coli cell)	Aerobic conditions	Anaerobic conditions
Alanine	A	Ala	2.9	−1	1
Cysteine	C	Cys	0.52	11	15
Aspartic acid	D	Asp	1.4	0	2
Glutamic acid	E	Glu	1.5	−7	−1
Phenylalanine	F	Phe	1.1	−6	2
Glycine	G	Gly	3.5	−2	2
Histidine	H	His	0.54	1	7
Isoleucine	I	Ile	1.7	7	11
Lysine	K	Lys	2.0	5	9
Leucine	L	Leu	2.6	−9	1
Methionine	M	Met	0.88	21	23
Asparagine	N	Asn	1.4	3	5
Pyrrolysine	O	Pyl	-	-	-
Proline	P	Pro	1.3	−2	4
Glutamine	Q	Gln	1.5	−6	0
Arginine	R	Arg	1.7	5	13
Serine	S	Ser	1.2	−2	2
Threonine	T	Thr	1.5	6	8
Selenocysteine	U	Sec	-	-	-
Valine	V	Val	2.4	−2	2
Tryptophan	W	Trp	0.33	−7	7
Tyrosine	Y	Tyr	0.79	−8	2

=== Remarks ===
Amino acid	Abbrev.		Remarks
Alanine	A	Ala	Very abundant and very versatile, it is more stiff than glycine, but small enough to pose only small steric limits for the protein conformation. It behaves fairly neutrally, and can be located in both hydrophilic regions on the protein outside and the hydrophobic areas inside.
Asparagine or aspartic acid	B	Asx	A placeholder when either amino acid may occupy a position
Cysteine	C	Cys	The sulfur atom bonds readily to heavy metal ions. Under oxidizing conditions, two cysteines can join in a disulfide bond to form the amino acid cystine. When cystines are part of a protein, insulin for example, the tertiary structure is stabilized, which makes the protein more resistant to denaturation; therefore, disulfide bonds are common in proteins that have to function in harsh environments including digestive enzymes (e.g., pepsin and chymotrypsin) and structural proteins (e.g., keratin). Disulfides are also found in peptides too small to hold a stable shape on their own (e.g. insulin).
Aspartic acid	D	Asp	Asp behaves similarly to glutamic acid, and carries a hydrophilic acidic group with strong negative charge. Usually, it is located on the outer surface of the protein, making it water-soluble. It binds to positively charged molecules and ions, and is often used in enzymes to fix the metal ion. When located inside of the protein, aspartate and glutamate are usually paired with arginine and lysine.
Glutamic acid	E	Glu	Glu behaves similarly to aspartic acid, and has a longer, slightly more flexible side chain.
Phenylalanine	F	Phe	Essential for humans, phenylalanine, tyrosine, and tryptophan contain a large, rigid aromatic group on the side chain. These are the biggest amino acids. Like isoleucine, leucine, and valine, these are hydrophobic and tend to orient towards the interior of the folded protein molecule. Phenylalanine can be converted into tyrosine.
Glycine	G	Gly	Because of the two hydrogen atoms at the α carbon, glycine is not optically active. It is the smallest amino acid, rotates easily, and adds flexibility to the protein chain. It is able to fit into the tightest spaces, e.g., the triple helix of collagen. As too much flexibility is usually not desired, as a structural component, it is less common than alanine.
Histidine	H	His	His is essential for humans. In even slightly acidic conditions, protonation of the nitrogen occurs, changing the properties of histidine and the polypeptide as a whole. It is used by many proteins as a regulatory mechanism, changing the conformation and behavior of the polypeptide in acidic regions such as the late endosome or lysosome, enforcing conformation change in enzymes. However, only a few histidines are needed for this, so it is comparatively scarce.
Isoleucine	I	Ile	Ile is essential for humans. Isoleucine, leucine, and valine have large aliphatic hydrophobic side chains. Their molecules are rigid, and their mutual hydrophobic interactions are important for the correct folding of proteins, as these chains tend to be located inside of the protein molecule.
Leucine or isoleucine	J	Xle	A placeholder when either amino acid may occupy a position
Lysine	K	Lys	Lys is essential for humans, and behaves similarly to arginine. It contains a long, flexible side chain with a positively charged end. The flexibility of the chain makes lysine and arginine suitable for binding to molecules with many negative charges on their surfaces. E.g., DNA-binding proteins have their active regions rich with arginine and lysine. The strong charge makes these two amino acids prone to be located on the outer hydrophilic surfaces of the proteins; when they are found inside, they are usually paired with a corresponding negatively charged amino acid, e.g., aspartate or glutamate.
Leucine	L	Leu	Leu is essential for humans, and behaves similarly to isoleucine and valine.
Methionine	M	Met	Met is essential for humans. Always the first amino acid to be incorporated into a protein, it is sometimes removed after translation. Like cysteine, it contains sulfur, but with a methyl group instead of hydrogen. This methyl group can be activated, and is used in many reactions where a new carbon atom is being added to another molecule.
Asparagine	N	Asn	Similar to aspartic acid, Asn contains an amide group where Asp has a carboxyl.
Pyrrolysine	O	Pyl	Similar to lysine, but it has a pyrroline ring attached.
Proline	P	Pro	Pro contains an unusual ring to the N-end amine group, which forces the CO-NH amide sequence into a fixed conformation. It can disrupt protein folding structures like α helix or β sheet, forcing the desired kink in the protein chain. Common in collagen, it often undergoes a post-translational modification to hydroxyproline.
Glutamine	Q	Gln	Similar to glutamic acid, Gln contains an amide group where Glu has a carboxyl. Used in proteins and as a storage for ammonia, it is the most abundant amino acid in the body.
Arginine	R	Arg	Functionally similar to lysine.
Serine	S	Ser	Serine and threonine have a short group ended with a hydroxyl group. Its hydrogen is easy to remove, so serine and threonine often act as hydrogen donors in enzymes. Both are very hydrophilic, so the outer regions of soluble proteins tend to be rich with them.
Threonine	T	Thr	Essential for humans, Thr behaves similarly to serine.
Selenocysteine	U	Sec	The selenium analog of cysteine, in which selenium replaces the sulfur atom.
Valine	V	Val	Essential for humans, Val behaves similarly to isoleucine and leucine.
Tryptophan	W	Trp	Essential for humans, Trp behaves similarly to phenylalanine and tyrosine. It is a precursor of serotonin and is naturally fluorescent.
Unknown	X	Xaa	Placeholder when the amino acid is unknown or unimportant.
Tyrosine	Y	Tyr	Tyr behaves similarly to phenylalanine (precursor to tyrosine) and tryptophan, and is a precursor of melanin, epinephrine, and thyroid hormones. Naturally fluorescent, its fluorescence is usually quenched by energy transfer to tryptophans.
Glutamic acid or glutamine	Z	Glx	A placeholder when either amino acid may occupy a position

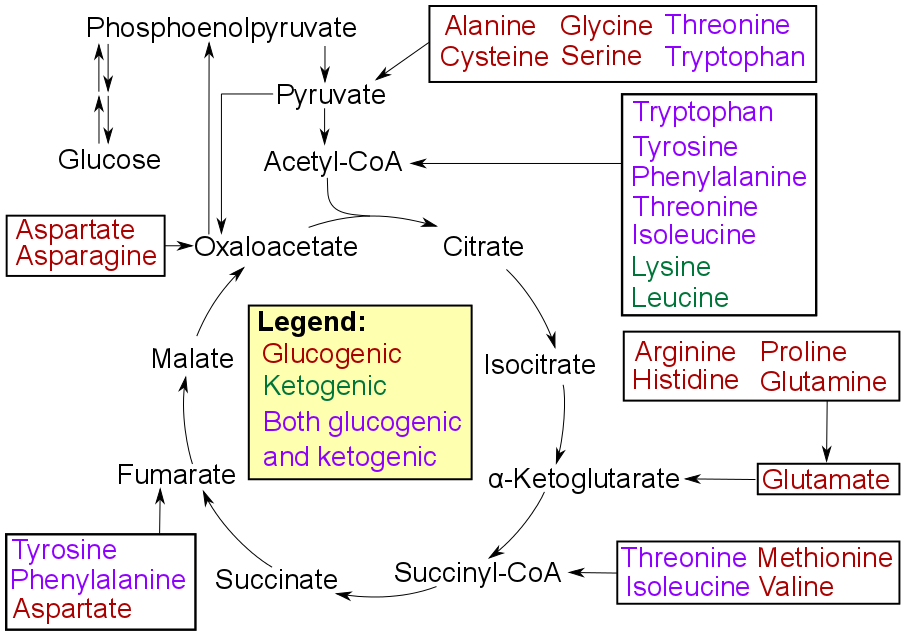
Amino acid catabolism

=== Catabolism ===
Amino acids can be classified according to the properties of their main products:

- Glucogenic, with the products having the ability to form glucose by gluconeogenesis
- Ketogenic, with the products not having the ability to form glucose: These products may still be used for ketogenesis or lipid synthesis.
- Amino acids catabolized into both glucogenic and ketogenic products

== See also ==
- Glucogenic amino acid
- Ketogenic amino acid

== General references ==
- Nelson, David L.; Cox, Michael M. (2000). Lehninger Principles of Biochemistry (3rd ed.). Worth Publishers. ISBN 978-1-57259-153-0.
- Kyte J, Doolittle RF (May 1982). "A simple method for displaying the hydropathic character of a protein". Journal of Molecular Biology. 157 (1): 105–32. CiteSeerX 10.1.1.458.454. doi:10.1016/0022-2836(82)90515-0. PMID 7108955.
- Meierhenrich, Uwe J. (2008). Amino acids and the asymmetry of life (1st ed.). Springer. ISBN 978-3-540-76885-2.
- Biochemistry, Harpers (2015). Harpers Illustrated Biochemistry (30th ed.). Lange. ISBN 978-0-07-182534-4.
