= Superior mesenteric artery syndrome =

Pinching of the intestine between the abdominal aorta and superior mesenteric artery

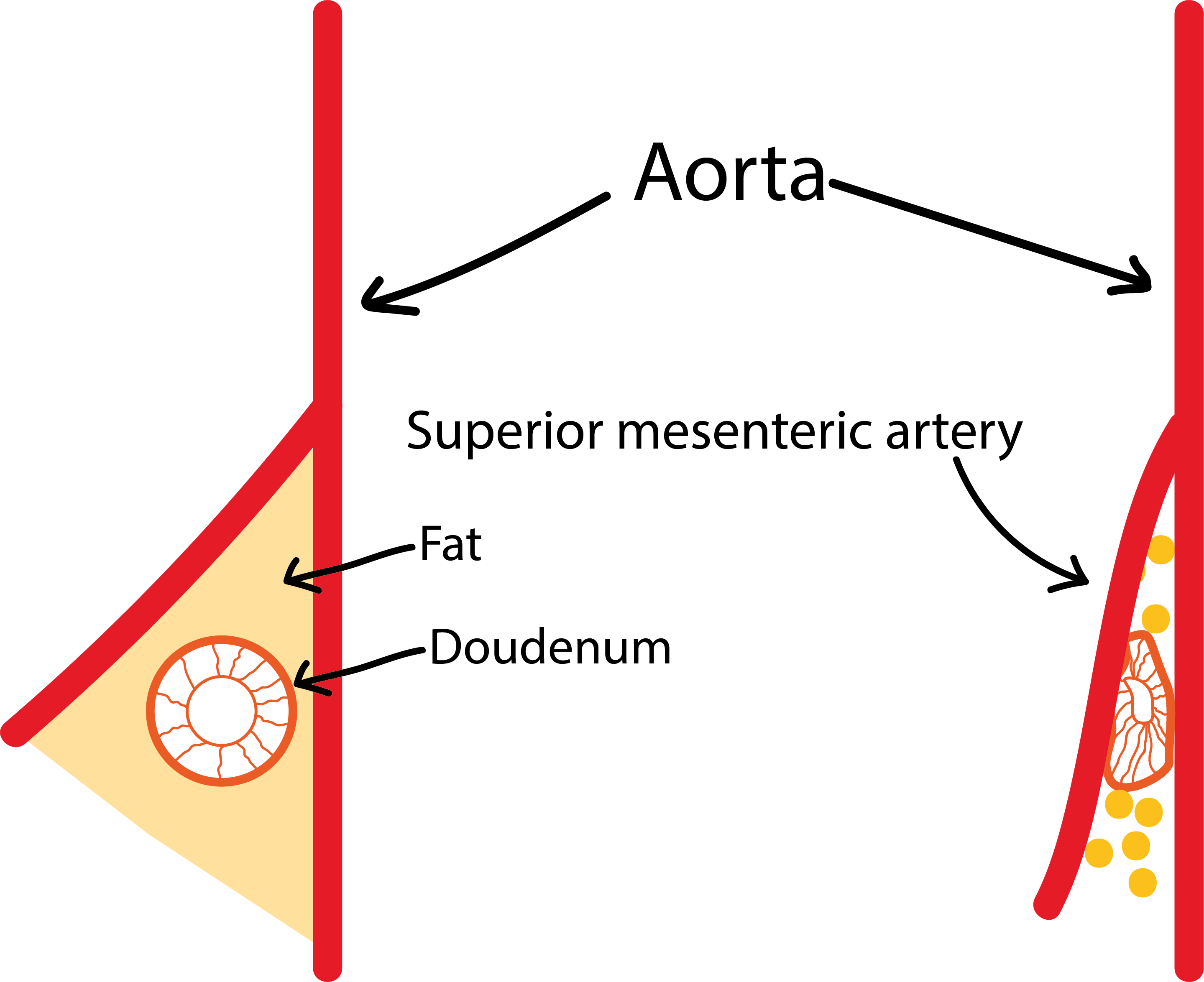
Superior mesenteric artery compressing the duodenum, featuring the superior mesenteric artery syndrome

Superior mesenteric artery (SMA) syndrome is a gastro-vascular disorder in which the third and final portion of the duodenum is compressed between the abdominal aorta (AA) and the overlying superior mesenteric artery. This rare, potentially life-threatening syndrome is typically caused by an angle of 6–25° between the AA and the SMA, in comparison to the normal range of 38–56°, due to a lack of retroperitoneal and visceral fat (mesenteric fat). In addition, the aortomesenteric distance is 2–8 millimeters, as opposed to the typical 10–20. However, a narrow SMA angle alone is not enough to make a diagnosis, because patients with a low BMI, most notably children, have been known to have a narrow SMA angle with no symptoms of SMA syndrome.

SMA syndrome is also known as Wilkie's syndrome, cast syndrome, mesenteric root syndrome, chronic duodenal ileus and intermittent arterio-mesenteric occlusion. It is distinct from nutcracker syndrome, which is the entrapment of the left renal vein between the AA and the SMA, although it is possible to be diagnosed with both conditions.

== Signs and symptoms ==
Superior mesenteric artery syndrome
- Other names: Wilkie syndrome
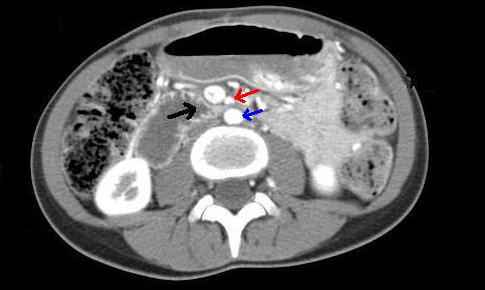
- Abdominal and pelvic computed tomography scan showing duodenal compression (black arrow) by the superior mesenteric artery (red arrow) and the abdominal aorta (blue arrow)
- Specialty: Gastroenterology, general surgery
- Symptoms: Early satiety, nausea, vomiting, extreme "stabbing" postprandial abdominal pain, abdominal distention and tenderness, burping, reflux, and heartburn.

Signs and symptoms include early satiety, nausea, vomiting, extreme "stabbing" postprandial abdominal pain (due to both the duodenal compression and the compensatory reversed peristalsis), abdominal distention/distortion, burping, external hypersensitivity or tenderness of the abdominal area, reflux, and heartburn. In infants, feeding difficulties and poor weight gain are also frequent symptoms.

In some cases of SMA syndrome, severe malnutrition accompanying spontaneous wasting may occur. This, in turn, increases the duodenal compression, which worsens the underlying cause, creating a cycle of worsening symptoms.

Fear of eating is commonly seen among those with the chronic form of SMA syndrome. For many, symptoms are partially relieved when in the left lateral decubitus or knee-to-chest position, or in the prone (face down) position. A Hayes maneuver, which corresponds to applying pressure below the umbilicus in cephalad and dorsal direction, elevates the root of the SMA, also slightly easing the constriction. Symptoms can be aggravated when leaning to the right or taking a face up position.

== Causes ==
Retroperitoneal fat and lymphatic tissue normally serve as a cushion for the duodenum, protecting it from compression by the SMA. SMA syndrome is thus triggered by any condition involving an insubstantial cushion and narrow mesenteric angle. SMA syndrome can present in two forms: chronic/congenital or acute/induced.

Patients with the chronic, congenital form of SMA syndrome predominantly have a lengthy or even lifelong history of abdominal complaints with intermittent exacerbations depending on the degree of duodenal compression. Risk factors include anatomic characteristics such as: asthenic (very thin or "lanky") body build, an unusually high insertion of the duodenum at the ligament of Treitz, a particularly low origin of the SMA, or intestinal malrotation around an axis formed by the SMA. Predisposition is easily aggravated by any of the following: poor motility of the digestive tract, retroperitional tumors, loss of appetite, malabsorption, cachexia, exaggerated lumbar lordosis, visceroptosis, abdominal wall laxity, peritoneal adhesions, abdominal trauma, rapid linear adolescent growth spurt, weight loss, starvation, catabolic states (as with cancer and burns), and history of neurological injury.

The acute form of SMA syndrome develops rapidly after traumatic incidents that forcibly hyper-extend the SMA across the duodenum, inducing the obstruction, or sudden weight loss for any reason. Causes include prolonged supine bed rest, scoliosis surgery, left nephrectomy, ileo-anal pouch surgery.

SMA syndrome is usually difficult to differentiate with anorexia nervosa. Patients with SMA syndrome can be hindered restoring weight in those with anorexia nervosa.

== Diagnosis ==
Diagnosis is very difficult, and usually one of exclusion. SMA syndrome is thus considered only after patients have undergone an extensive evaluation of their gastrointestinal tract including upper endoscopy, and evaluation for various malabsorptive, ulcerative and inflammatory intestinal conditions with a higher diagnostic frequency. Diagnosis may follow X-ray examination revealing duodenal dilation followed by abrupt constriction proximal to the overlying SMA, as well as a delay in transit of four to six hours through the gastroduodenal region. Standard diagnostic exams include abdominal and pelvic computed tomography (CT) scan with oral and IV contrast, upper gastrointestinal series (UGI), and, for equivocal cases, hypotonic duodenography. In addition, vascular imaging studies such as ultrasound and contrast angiography may be used to indicate increased bloodflow velocity through the SMA or a narrowed SMA angle.

Despite multiple case reports, there has been controversy surrounding the diagnosis and even the existence of SMA syndrome since symptoms do not always correlate well with radiologic findings, and may not always improve following surgical correction. However, the reason for the persistence of gastrointestinal symptoms even after surgical correction in some cases has been traced to the remaining prominence of reversed peristalsis in contrast to direct peristalsis.

Since females between the ages of 10 and 30 are most frequently affected, it is not uncommon for physicians to initially and incorrectly assume that emaciation is a choice of the patient instead of a consequence of SMA syndrome. Patients in the earlier stages of SMA syndrome often remain unaware that they are ill until substantial damage to their health is done, since they may attempt to adapt to the condition by gradually decreasing their food intake or naturally gravitating toward a lighter and more digestible diet.

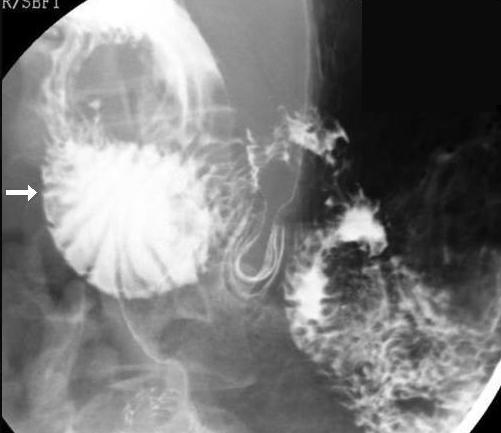
Upper gastrointestinal series showing extreme duodenal dilation (white arrow) abruptly preceding constriction by the SMA

Ultrasound showing SMA syndrome

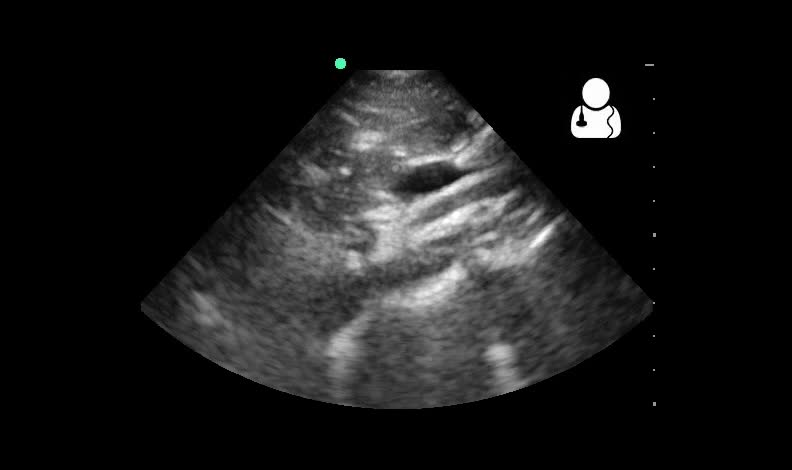
Ultrasound showing SMA syndrome

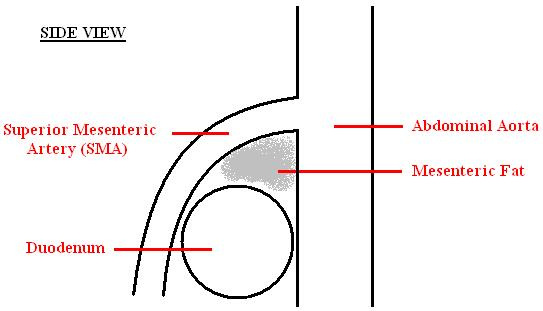
A diagram of a healthy mesenteric angle

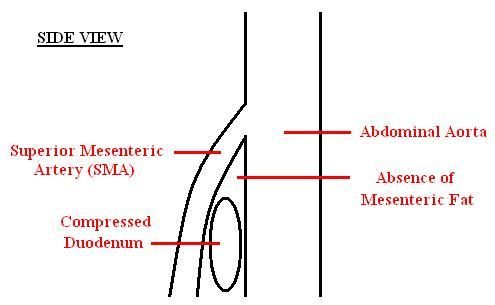
A diagram of a compressed duodenum due to a reduced mesenteric angle

== Treatment ==
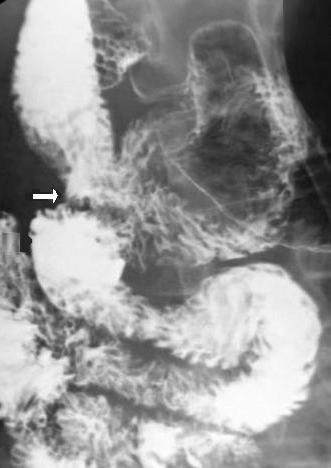
Upper gastrointestinal series showing duodenojejunostomy (white arrow)

SMA syndrome can present in acute, acquired form (e.g., abruptly emerging within an inpatient stay following scoliosis surgery) as well as chronic form (i.e., developing throughout the course of a lifetime and advancing due to environmental triggers, life changes, or other illnesses). According to a number of recent sources, at least 70% of cases can typically be treated with medical treatment, while the rest require surgical treatment.

Medical treatment is attempted first in many cases. In some cases, emergency surgery is necessary upon presentation. A six-week trial of medical treatment is recommended in pediatric cases. The goal of medical treatment for SMA syndrome is the resolution of underlying conditions and weight gain. Medical treatment may involve nasogastric tube placement for duodenal and gastric decompression, mobilization into the prone or left lateral decubitus position, the reversal or removal of the precipitating factor with proper nutrition and replacement of fluid and electrolytes, either by surgically inserted jejunal feeding tube, nasogastric intubation, or peripherally inserted central catheter (PICC line) administering total parenteral nutrition (TPN). Pro-motility agents such as metoclopramide may also be beneficial. Symptoms may improve after restoration of weight, except when reversed peristalsis persists, or if regained fat refuses to accumulate within the mesenteric angle. Most patients seem to benefit from nutritional support with hyperalimentation irrespective of disease history.

If medical treatment fails, or is not feasible due to severe illness, surgical intervention is required. The most common operation for SMA syndrome, duodenojejunostomy, was first proposed in 1907 by Bloodgood. Performed as either an open surgery or laparoscopically, duodenojejunostomy involves the creation of an anastomosis between the duodenum and the jejunum, bypassing the compression caused by the AA and the SMA. Less common surgical treatments for SMA syndrome include Roux-en-Y duodenojejunostomy, gastrojejunostomy, anterior transposition of the third portion of the duodenum, intestinal derotation, division of the ligament of Treitz (Strong's operation), and transposition of the SMA. Both transposition of the SMA and lysis of the duodenal suspensory muscle have the advantage that they do not involve the creation of an intestinal anastomosis.

The possible persistence of symptoms after surgical bypass can be traced to the remaining prominence of reversed peristalsis in contrast to direct peristalsis. However, the precipitating factor (the duodenal compression) has been bypassed or relieved. Reversed peristalsis has been shown to respond to duodenal circular drainage, a complex and invasive open surgical procedure originally implemented and performed in China.

In some cases, SMA syndrome may occur alongside a serious, life-threatening condition such as cancer or AIDS. Even in these cases, though, treatment of the SMA syndrome can lead to a reduction in symptoms and an increased quality of life.

== Prognosis ==
Delay in the diagnosis of SMA syndrome can result in fatal catabolysis (advanced malnutrition), dehydration, electrolyte abnormalities, hypokalemia, acute gastric rupture or intestinal perforation (from prolonged mesenteric ischemia), gastric distention, spontaneous upper gastrointestinal bleeding, hypovolemic shock, and aspiration pneumonia.

A small number of sources have quoted a roughly 33% mortality rate for superior mesenteric artery syndrome. Despite extensive research, no source data has been found to support this mortality rate, suggesting it is likely unreliable. While research establishing an official mortality rate may not exist, two studies of SMA syndrome patients, one published in 2006 looking at 22 cases and another in 2012 looking at 80 cases, noted mortality rates of 0% and 6.3%, respectively. According to the authors in one of these studies, the expected outcome for SMA syndrome treatment is generally considered excellent.

== Epidemiology ==
According to a 1956 study, only 0.3% of patients referred for an upper-gastrointestinal-tract barium studies fit this diagnosis, and is thus a rare disease. Recognition of SMA syndrome as a distinct clinical entity is controversial, due in part to its possible confusion with a number of other conditions, though it is now widely acknowledged. However, unfamiliarity with this condition in the medical community coupled with its intermittent and nonspecific symptomatology probably results in its underdiagnosis.

As the syndrome involves a lack of essential fat, more than half of those diagnosed are underweight, sometimes to the point of sickliness and emaciation. Females are impacted more often than males, and while the syndrome can occur at any age, it is most frequently diagnosed in early adulthood. The most common co-morbid conditions include mental and behavioral disorders including eating disorders and depression, infectious diseases including tuberculosis and acute gastroenteritis, and nervous system diseases including muscular dystrophy, Parkinson's disease, and cerebral palsy.

== History ==
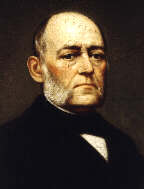
SMA syndrome was first described in 1861 by Carl Freiherr von Rokitansky.

SMA syndrome was first described in 1861 by Carl Freiherr von Rokitansky in victims at autopsy, but remained pathologically undefined until 1927 when British surgeon David Wilkie published the first comprehensive series of 75 patients.

== Society and culture ==
Former model Lisa Brown died in 2017 due to her SMAS after her insurance denied the potentially life-saving surgery she needed. Her initial surgery failed, causing her to require an intestinal transplant that was expected to cost up to $1 million, leading her insurance to deny it. She planned her own funeral.

=== Non-profit ===
In 2017 the only US non-profit began distributing grants to those with SMAS. They are registered to the IRS under the name Superior Mesenteric Artery Syndrome Research, Awareness and Support, but also work under the DBA of SMAS Patient Assistance. They offer several resources on their website smasyndrome.com and their Facebook business page. SMAS Patient assistance works to disprove inaccurate information, educate on better diagnostic testing, and more successful surgeries such as Duodenal Deroation with LADDS.

== See also ==
- Catabolysis
- Malnutrition
- Median arcuate ligament syndrome
- Nutcracker syndrome
- Small bowel obstruction
- Rare diseases
- Visceroptosis
- Wasting
