= Jaw =

Opposable articulated structure at the entrance of the mouth

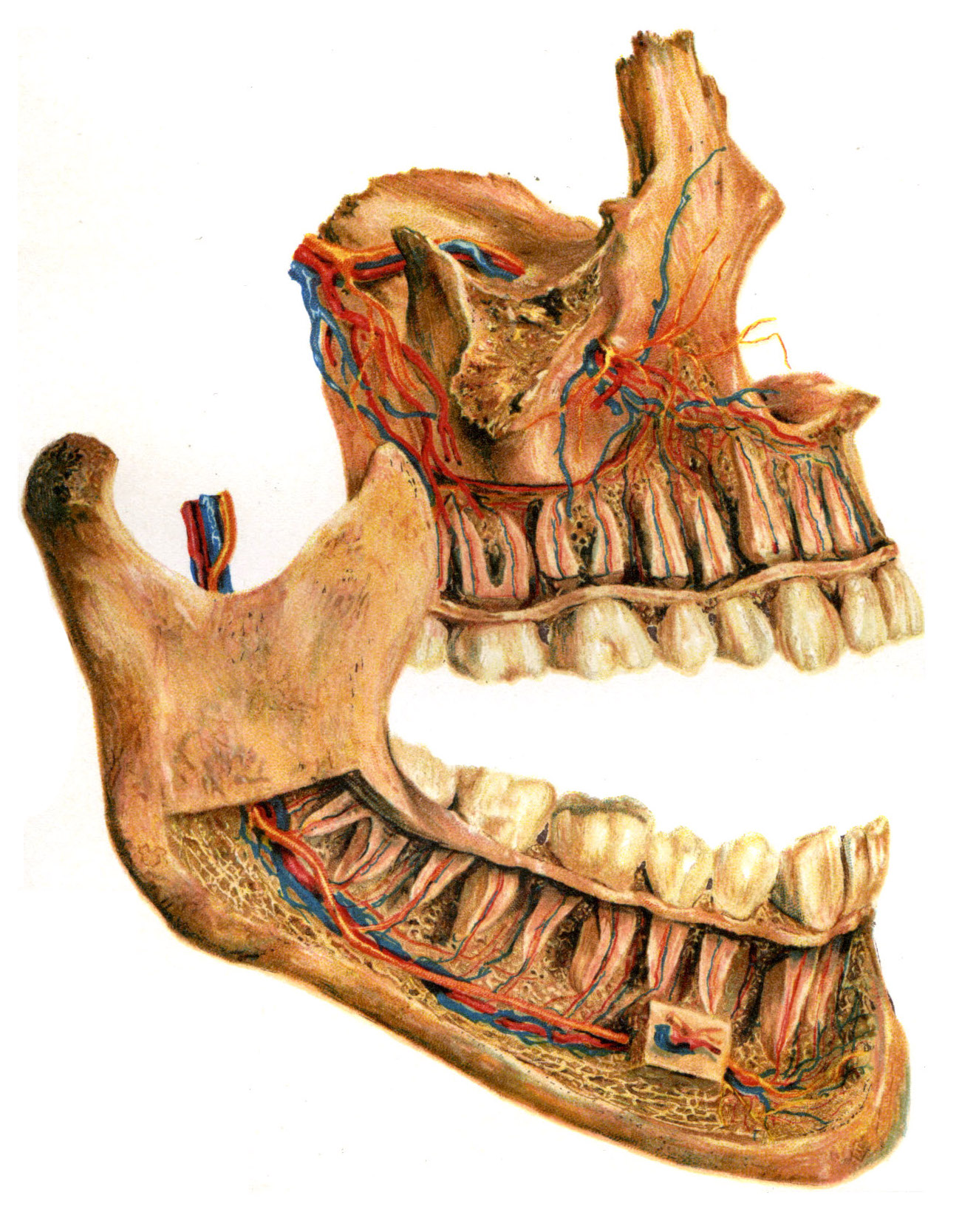
Human jaws viewed from the right

The jaws are a pair of opposable articulated structures at the entrance of the mouth, typically used for grasping and manipulating food. The term jaws is also broadly applied to the whole of the structures constituting the vault of the mouth and serving to open and close it and is part of the body plan of humans and most animals.

== Arthropods ==
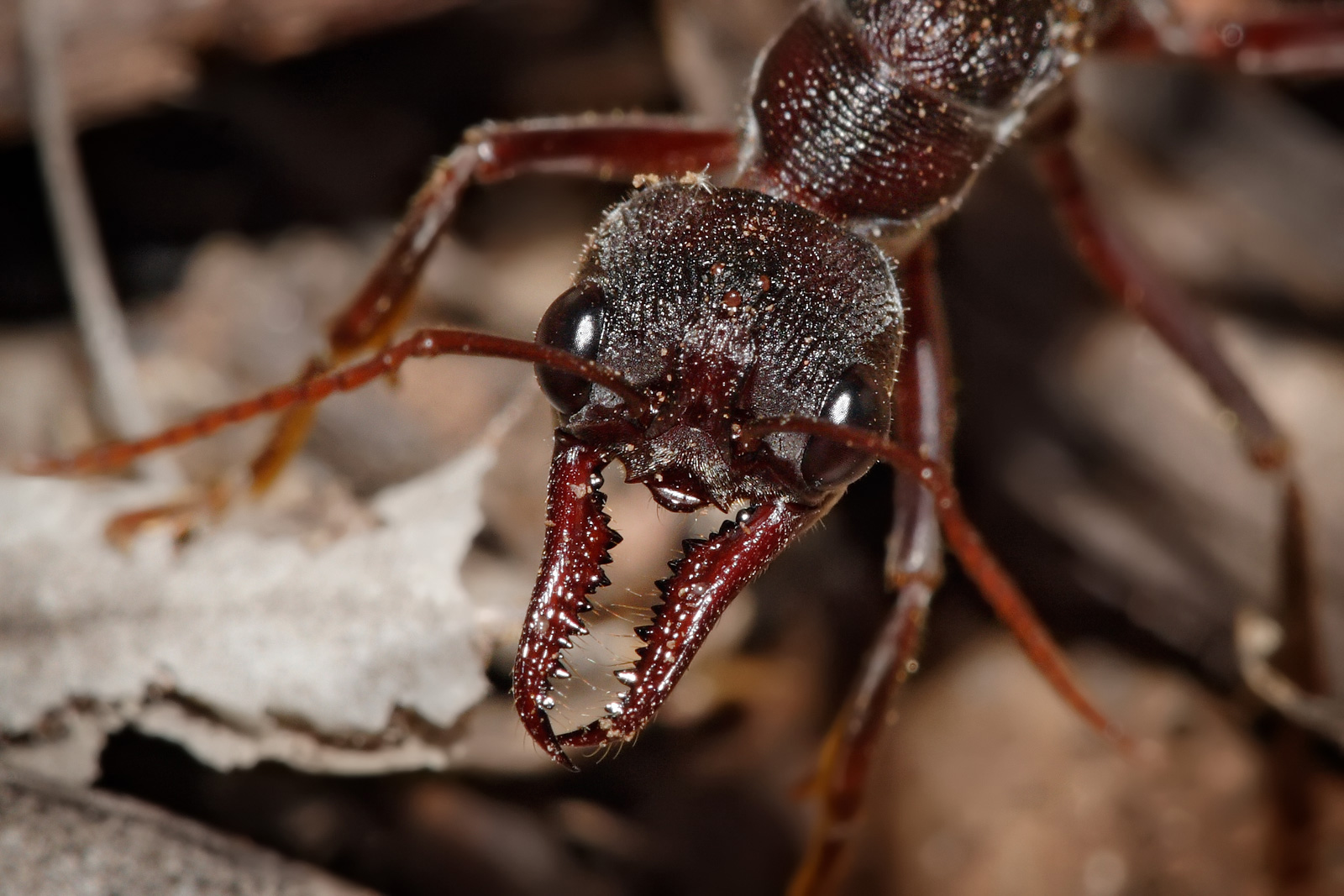
The mandibles of a bull ant

In arthropods, the jaws are chitinous and oppose laterally, and may consist of mandibles or chelicerae. These jaws are often composed of numerous mouthparts. Their function is fundamentally for food acquisition, conveyance to the mouth, and/or initial processing (mastication or chewing). Many mouthparts and associate structures (such as pedipalps) are modified legs.

== Vertebrates ==
In most vertebrates, the jaws are bony or cartilaginous and oppose vertically, comprising an upper jaw and a lower jaw. The vertebrate jaw is derived from the most anterior two pharyngeal arches supporting the gills, and usually bears numerous teeth.

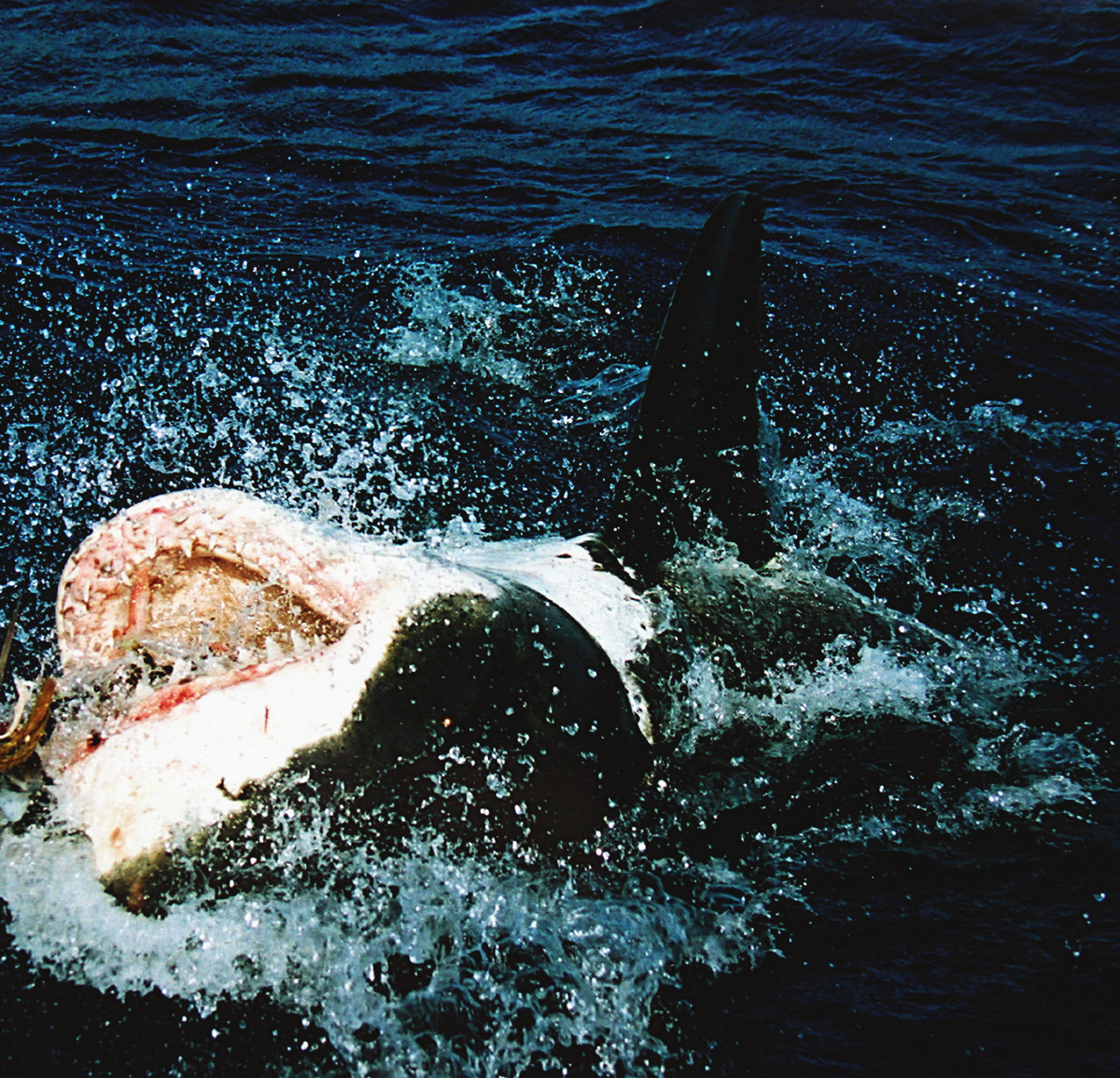
Jaws of a great white shark

=== Fish ===
Moray eels have two sets of jaws: the oral jaws that capture prey and the pharyngeal jaws that advance into the mouth and move prey from the oral jaws to the esophagus for swallowing.

The vertebrate jaw probably originally evolved in the Silurian period and appeared in the Placoderm fish which further diversified in the Devonian. The two most anterior pharyngeal arches are thought to have become the jaw itself and the hyoid arch, respectively. The hyoid system suspends the jaw from the braincase of the skull, permitting great mobility of the jaws. While there is no fossil evidence directly to support this theory, it makes sense in light of the numbers of pharyngeal arches that are visible in extant jawed vertebrates (the Gnathostomes), which have seven arches, and primitive jawless vertebrates (the Agnatha), which have nine.

The original selective advantage offered by the jaw may not be related to feeding, but rather to increased respiration efficiency. The jaws were used in the buccal pump (observable in modern fish and amphibians) that pumps water across the gills of fish or air into the lungs in the case of amphibians. Over evolutionary time the more familiar use of jaws (to humans), in feeding, was selected for and became a very important function in vertebrates. Many teleost fish have substantially modified jaws for suction feeding and jaw protrusion, resulting in highly complex jaws with dozens of bones involved.

=== Amphibians, reptiles, and birds ===
The jaw in tetrapods is substantially simplified compared to fish. Most of the upper jaw bones (premaxilla, maxilla, jugal, quadratojugal, and quadrate) have been fused to the braincase, while the lower jaw bones (dentary, splenial, angular, surangular, and articular) have been fused together into a unit called the mandible. The jaw articulates via a hinge joint between the quadrate and articular. The jaws of tetrapods exhibit varying degrees of mobility between jaw bones. Some species have jaw bones completely fused, while others may have joints allowing for mobility of the dentary, quadrate, or maxilla. The snake skull shows the greatest degree of cranial kinesis, which allows the snake to swallow large prey items.

=== Mammals ===
In mammals, the jaws are made up of the mandible (lower jaw) and the maxilla (upper jaw). In the ape, there is a reinforcement to the lower jaw bone called the simian shelf. In the evolution of the mammalian jaw, two of the bones of the jaw structure (the articular bone of the lower jaw, and quadrate) were reduced in size and incorporated into the ear, while many others have been fused together. As a result, mammals show little or no cranial kinesis, and the mandible is attached to the temporal bone by the temporomandibular joints. Temporomandibular joint dysfunction is a common disorder of these joints, characterized by pain, clicking and limitation of mandibular movement. Especially in the therian mammal, the premaxilla that constituted the anterior tip of the upper jaw in reptiles has reduced in size; and most of the mesenchyme at the ancestral upper jaw tip has become a protruded mammalian nose.

== Sea urchins ==
Sea urchins possess unique jaws which display five-part symmetry, termed the Aristotle's lantern. Each unit of the jaw holds a single, perpetually growing tooth composed of crystalline calcium carbonate.

== See also ==
- Muscles of mastication
- Otofacial syndrome
- Predentary
- Prognathism
- Rostral bone
