= Visceroptosis =

Sinking of the abdominal organs below their natural position

Visceroptosis (Glénard's disease)
- Other names: Enteroptosis, splanchnoptosis, abdominal ptosis
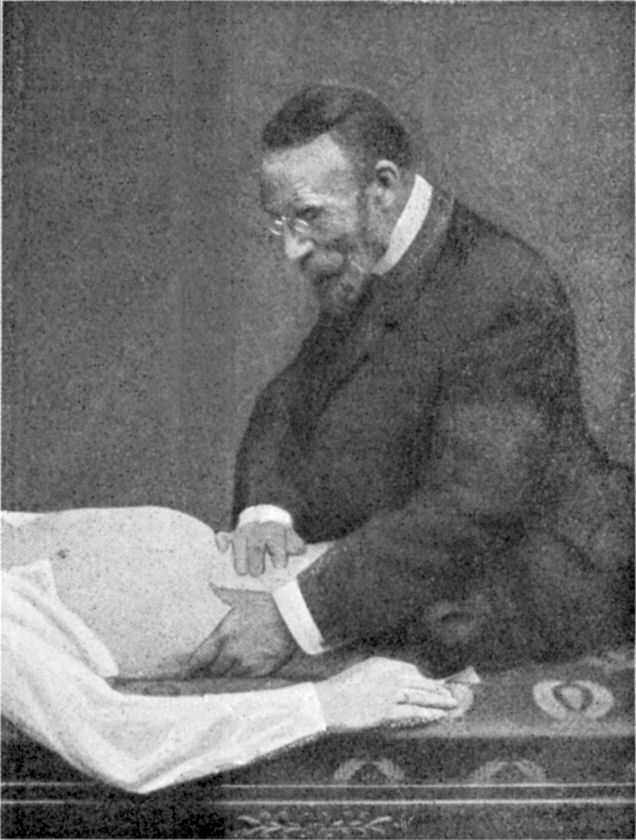
- Dr. Frantz Glénard (1848–1920)
- Specialty: Gastroenterology, general surgery

Visceroptosis is a prolapse or a sinking of the abdominal viscera (internal organs) below their natural position. "Ptosis" being the defining term, any or all of the organs may be displaced downward. When only the intestines are involved, the condition is known as enteroptosis. When the stomach is found below its normal position, the term gastroptosis is used. The condition exists in all degrees of severity and may not give rise to any adverse symptoms.

Generally, however, there may be loss of appetite, heartburn, nervous indigestion, constipation, diarrhea, abdominal distention, headache, vertigo, emaciation, and loss of sleep. Any or all of these symptoms may be present.

It is known to be a rare complication of Ehlers–Danlos Syndrome (EDS). The condition may be brought about by loss of muscular tone, particularly of the abdominal muscles, with relaxation of the ligaments that typically hold the viscera in place. Tightlacing has been held to be a cause as well. Corsets to reduce the circumference of women's waists have been used to enable fashionable styles occurring during several historical periods, such as the late 1800s and early 1900s, when these symptoms were described for treatment by physicians.

Adverse symptoms may be alleviated by supporting the organs with a properly applied bandage, or other similar device. Rest in bed, attention to diet, hygiene, exercise, and general muscular strengthening will cure the majority of cases. In some cases, surgical intervention may become necessary.

Visceroptosis is a known risk factor for the development of Median arcuate ligament syndrome, Superior mesenteric artery syndrome, and gastroparesis.

Visceroptosis also is known as Glénard's disease (after French physician Frantz Glénard [1848–1920] of Lyon).

- Glénard's theory – the theory that abdominal ptosis is a nutritional disease with atrophy and prolapse of the intestine
- Glénard's test (also called girdle test) – while standing behind the patient, the examiner places his arms around the patient, so that his hands meet in front of the patient's abdomen; he squeezes, raising the viscera, and then allows them to fall suddenly; Glénard's theory suggests that if the patient feels relieved by the raising pressure and experiences distress on the release, the condition is probably one of splanchnoptosis
- Stiller's theory – the theory that gastroptosis is due to universal asthenia characterized by weakness and laxity of the viscera
