= Gastroptosis =

Downward displacement of the stomach

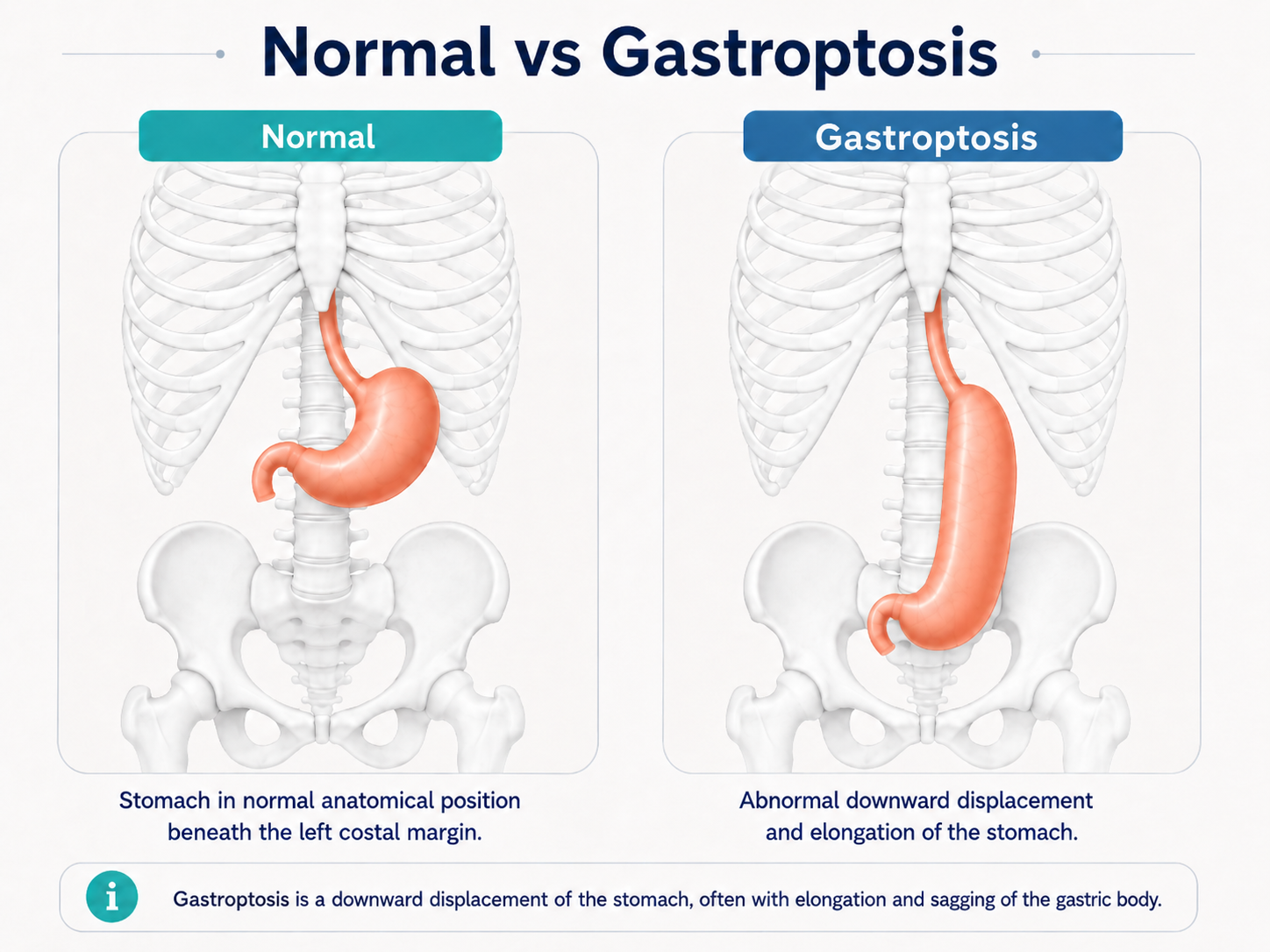
- Specialty: Gastroenterology
- Risk factors: Female gender, Ehlers-Danlos Syndrome
- Diagnostic method: X-ray with barium contrast

Gastroptosis is the abnormal downward dislocation (ptosis) of the stomach in which its greater curve is displaced below the iliac crest. The stomach is often elongated.

The condition frequently causes digestive symptoms, epigastric pain, constipation, gastric reflux, nausea, decreased appetite, gastroparesis (delayed gastric emptying), and in severe cases Median arcuate ligament syndrome. It is much more prominent in women than men, and is diagnosed with x-ray using barium contrast. Gastroptosis is mainly caused by the relaxation of surrounding ligaments and mesenteries as a result of the weight of the stomach and may be due to genetic connective tissue disease.

== See also ==
- Visceroptosis
