= Otofacial syndrome =

- Specialty: Oral and maxillofacial surgeon

Otofacial syndrome is an extraordinarily rare congenital deformity in which a person is born without a mandible, and, consequently, without a chin.

In nearly all cases, the child does not survive because they are unable to breathe and eat properly. Even with reconstructive surgery, the tongue is extremely underdeveloped, making unaided breathing and swallowing impossible. However there are cases, where individuals are living longer. In such cases as in Joseph K. Williams (DJBrownSugarV).

== Treatment ==
The first challenge to survival is assisted breathing and tubal feeding. This is a lifelong affair, generally requiring the patient to spend nearly all of the time under direct hospital care.

American surgeons successfully used bone from the hip of an Irish teenager named Alan Doherty to rebuild a jaw and chin. Surgeons began the procedures in June 2007 and completed the final of seven surgeries on 25 August 2008. Doherty is now able to smile, but is still unable to breathe, eat, or speak on his own.
