= Wasting =

Loss of muscle and fat tissue

- Specialty: Pediatrics

Malnutrition number of children who are wasted

Wasting, also known as wasting syndrome, refers to the process by which a debilitating disease causes muscle and fat tissue to "waste" away. Wasting is sometimes referred to as "acute malnutrition" because it is believed that episodes of wasting have a short duration, in contrast to stunting, which is regarded as chronic malnutrition. An estimated 45 million children under 5 years of age (or 6.7%) were wasted in 2021. Wasting prevalence declined from 7.5% in 2012 to 6.8% in 2022, with 6.2% of children under five years old projected to be wasted in 2030, more than double the 3% Sustainable Development Goals target. Prevalence is highest in Southern Asia, followed by Oceania (excluding Australia and New Zealand) and South-eastern Asia.

== Causes ==
Wasting can be caused by an extremely low energy intake (e.g., caused by famine), nutrient losses due to infection, or a combination of low intake and high loss. Infections and conditions associated with wasting include tuberculosis, chronic diarrhea, AIDS, and superior mesenteric artery syndrome. The mechanism may involve cachectin – also called tumor necrosis factor, a macrophage-secreted cytokine. Caretakers and health providers can sometimes contribute to wasting if the patient is placed on an improper diet. Voluntary weight loss and eating disorders are excluded as causes of wasting.

== Diagnosis ==
=== Classification ===
- Children: Weight-for-height (WFH). In infants under 24 months, recumbent (supine) length is used. WFH as % of median reference value is calculated this way:

$$\mathrm{WFH} = \frac{\mbox{weight of a given child}}{\mbox{median weight for a given child of that height}} \times 100$$

Cutoff points may vary, but <80% (close to −2 Z-score) is often used.

- Adults:
  - Body Mass Index (BMI) is the quotient between weight and height squared (kg/m^{2}). An individual with a BMI < 18.5 is regarded as a case of wasting.
  - Percent of body weight lost (At Tufts, an unintentional loss of 6% or more in 6 months is regarded as wasting)

== Treatment ==
Antiretrovirals and anabolic steroids have been used to treat HIV wasting syndrome. Additionally, an increase in protein-rich foods such as peanut butter and legumes (dried beans and peas) can assist in controlling the loss of muscle mass.

== See also ==
- Anorexia
- Atrophy
- Cachexia
- Superior mesenteric artery syndrome
- Weight loss
