= Ptosis (chin) =

Chin which droops over the jawline

A ptotic chin is a chin that droops over the jawline. Ptosis of the tip of the chin is common and can be seen in persons of any age. It is frequently seen in older patients but not infrequently, it is seen in young people as a familial trait. More commonly, however, the droop develops over time as the chin pad slides downward along with the soft tissues elsewhere in the face and neck.

== Surgery ==
A variety of techniques have been described to correct ptosis of the chin. One technique uses a small intraoral incision to place a U-shaped Prolene suture that gathers the soft tissue of the chin and elevates it above the lower border of the mandibular symphysis.

== See also ==
- Ptosis (breasts)
- Ptosis (eyelid)
