= Ketogenic amino acid =

Type of amino acid

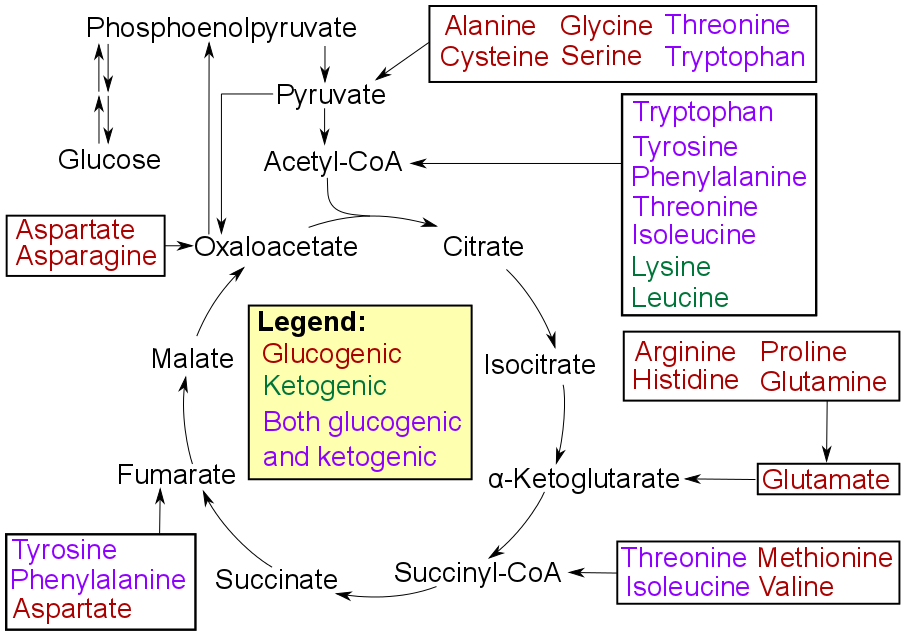
Summary of amino acid catabolism

A ketogenic amino acid is an amino acid that can be degraded directly into acetyl-CoA, which is the precursor of ketone bodies and myelin, particularly during early childhood, when the developing brain requires high rates of myelin synthesis. This is in contrast to the glucogenic amino acids, which are converted into glucose. Ketogenic amino acids are unable to be converted to glucose as both carbon atoms in the ketone body are ultimately degraded to carbon dioxide in the citric acid cycle.

In humans, two amino acids – leucine and lysine – are exclusively ketogenic. Five more are amphibolic (both ketogenic and glucogenic): phenylalanine, isoleucine, threonine, tryptophan and tyrosine. The remaining thirteen are exclusively glucogenic.

== Studies ==
Ketogenic amino acids serve important roles in the human body, leading to the study of ketogenic amino acid rich (KAAR) diets as possible treatment for non-alcoholic fatty liver disease (NAFLD) and diabetes. Dietary studies of fatty liver disease in mice show that decreasing the intake of ketogenic amino acids lysine and threonine may induce hepatic steatosis, a major cause of non-alcoholic fatty liver disease. Leucine in particular has been shown to serve an important role in the metabolic pathway for insulin via activation of the rapamycin complex 1 (mTORC1) and protein S6 kinase 1 (S6K1) for which over-activation leads to insulin resistance. Further studies illustrate that ketogenic amino acid rich diets may aid in decreasing obesity and insulin resistance, but their usage remains disputed. Ketone bodies, specifically β-hydroxybutyrate (βHB) whose levels are increased while on a ketogenic diet, aid in the renewal of myelin for demyelinated axons. This renewal of myelin is important for individuals with multiple sclerosis (MS). MS is a condition which the immune system will attack the myelin sheath that insulates the nerves. Ketogenic diets are being explored as a possible remedy for this condition as the ketone bodies aid in the regeneration of myelin. Ketogenic diets are shown to alleviate diffuse axonal injury (DAI). This was tested using rats being fed a standard diet in comparison to rats being fed a ketogenic diet post DAI. Rats that were fed a standard diet showed a progressive degradation of myelin, on day 14 post DAI it was evident that myelin sheaths have collapsed, dissolved or disappeared from the injured axons. For the axons with remaining myelin, the myelin was becoming thinner. Rats that were served ketogenic diets presented axons with thicker myelin in comparison to the standard diet rats. The marker that was used to determine axonal injury in this study was amyloid precursor protein (APP). Rats that were fed a standard diet and an uptake of APP, leading to an increase in damaged/injured axons.

== See also ==
- Glucogenic amino acid
- List of standard amino acids
- Ketogenesis
- Metabolism
