= Fractionation of carbon isotopes in oxygenic photosynthesis =

Photosynthesis converts carbon dioxide to carbohydrates via several metabolic pathways that provide energy to an organism and preferentially react with certain stable isotopes of carbon. The selective enrichment of one stable isotope over another creates distinct isotopic fractionations that can be measured and correlated among oxygenic phototrophs. The degree of carbon isotope fractionation is influenced by several factors, including the metabolism, anatomy, growth rate, and environmental conditions of the organism. Understanding these variations in carbon fractionation across species is useful for biogeochemical studies, including the reconstruction of paleoecology, plant evolution, and the characterization of food chains.

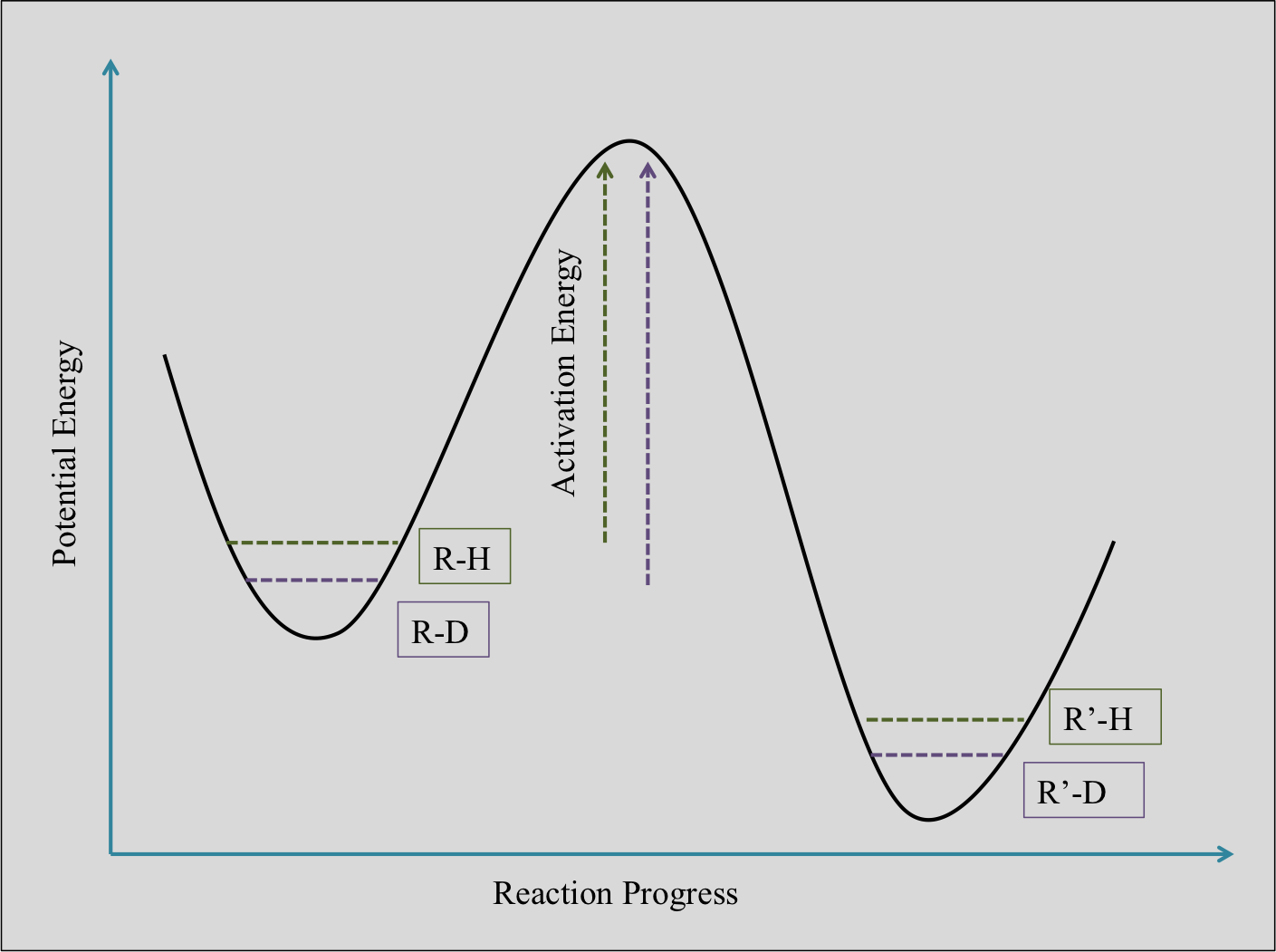
A simplified model of a chemical reaction with pathways for a light isotope (H) and heavy isotope (D) of hydrogen. The same principle applies for the light isotope ^{12}C and heavy isotope ^{13}C of carbon. The positions on the energy wells are based on the quantum harmonic oscillator. Note the lower energy state of the heavier isotope and the higher energy state of the lighter isotope. Under kinetic conditions, such as an enzymatic reaction with RuBisCO, the lighter isotope is favored because of a lower activation energy.

Oxygenic photosynthesis is a metabolic pathway facilitated by autotrophs, including plants, algae, and cyanobacteria. This pathway converts inorganic carbon dioxide from the atmosphere or aquatic environment into carbohydrates, using water and energy from light, then releases molecular oxygen as a product. Organic carbon contains less of the stable isotope Carbon-13, or ^{13}C, relative to the initial inorganic carbon from the atmosphere or water because photosynthetic carbon fixation involves several fractionating reactions with kinetic isotope effects. These reactions undergo a kinetic isotope effect because they are limited by overcoming an activation energy barrier. The lighter isotope has a higher energy state in the quantum well of a chemical bond, allowing it to be preferentially formed into products. Different organisms fix carbon through different mechanisms, which are reflected in the varying isotope compositions across photosynthetic pathways (see table below, and explanation of notation in "Carbon Isotope Measurement" section). The following sections will outline the different oxygenic photosynthetic pathways and what contributes to their associated delta values.

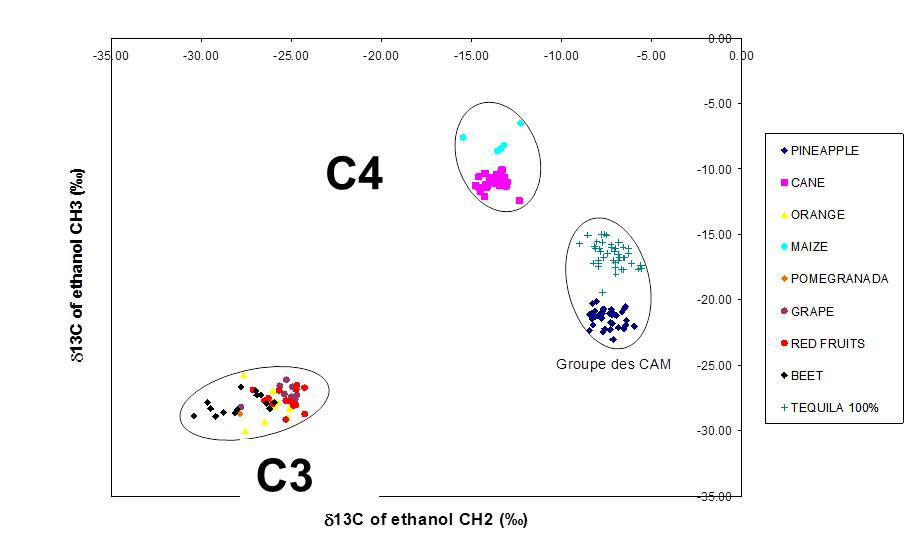
Different photosynthetic pathways (C3, C4, and CAM) yields biomass with different δ^{13}C values.

Isotope Delta Values of Photosynthetic Pathways
Pathway	δ^{13}C (‰)
C3	-20 to -37
C4	-12 to -16
CAM	-10 to -20
Phytoplankton	-18 to -25

== Carbon isotope measurement ==
Carbon on Earth naturally occurs in two stable isotopes, with 98.9% in the form of ^{12}C and 1.1% in ^{13}C. The ratio between these isotopes varies in biological organisms due to metabolic processes that selectively use one carbon isotope over the other, or "fractionate" carbon through kinetic or thermodynamic effects. Oxygenic photosynthesis takes place in plants and microorganisms through different chemical pathways, so various forms of organic material reflect different ratios of ^{13}C isotopes. Understanding these variations in carbon fractionation across species is applied in isotope geochemistry and ecological isotope studies to understand biochemical processes, establish food chains, or model the carbon cycle through geological time.

Carbon isotope fractionations are expressed in using delta notation of δ^{13}C ("delta thirteen C"), which is reported in parts per thousand (per mille, ‰). δ^{13}C is defined in relation to the Vienna Pee Dee Belemnite (VPDB, ^{13}C/^{12}C = 0.01118) as an established reference standard. This is called a "delta value" and can be calculated from the formula below:

$$\delta^{13}\mathrm{C} = \left ( \frac{\left ( \frac{^{13}\mathrm{C}}{^{12}\mathrm{C}} \right )_\mathrm{sample}}{\left ( \frac{^{13}\mathrm{C}}{^{12}\mathrm{C}} \right )_\mathrm{standard}} -1 \right)\times1000$$

== Photosynthesis reactions ==
The chemical pathway of oxygenic photosynthesis fixes carbon in two stages: the light-dependent reactions and the light-independent reactions.

The light-dependent reactions capture light energy to transfer electrons from water and convert NADP^{+}, ADP, and inorganic phosphate into the energy-storage molecules NADPH and ATP. The overall equation for the light-dependent reactions is generally:

Overview of the Calvin cycle and carbon fixation C3 Pathway

2 H_{2}O + 2 NADP^{+} + 3 ADP + 3 P_{i} + light → 2 NADPH + 2 H^{+} + 3 ATP + O_{2}

The light-independent reactions undergo the Calvin-Benson cycle, in which the energy from NADPH and ATP is used to convert carbon dioxide and water into organic compounds via the enzyme RuBisCO. The overall general equation for the light-independent reactions is the following:

3 CO_{2} + 9 ATP + 6 NADPH + 6 H^{+} → C_{3}H_{6}O_{3}-phosphate + 9 ADP + 8 P_{i} + 6 NADP^{+} + 3 H_{2}O

The 3-carbon products (C_{3}H_{6}O_{3}-phosphate) of the Calvin cycle are later converted to glucose or other carbohydrates such as starch, sucrose, and cellulose.

== Fractionation via RuBisCO ==
Carboxylation of ribulose-1,5-bisphosphate (1) into two molecules of 3-phosphoglycerate (4) by RuBisCO. The intermediate molecule at (3) is 3-keto-2-carboxyarabinitol-1,5-bisphosphate, which decays almost instantaneously into 3-phosphoglycerate.

The large fractionation of ^{13}C in photosynthesis is due to the carboxylation reaction, which is carried out by the enzyme ribulose-1,5-bisphosphate carboxylase oxygenase, or RuBisCO. RuBisCO catalyzes the reaction between a five-carbon molecule, ribulose-1,5-bisphosphate (abbreviated as RuBP) and CO_{2} to form two molecules of 3-phosphoglyceric acid (abbreviated as PGA). PGA reacts with NADPH to produce 3-phosphoglyceraldehyde.

Isotope fractionation due to Rubisco (form I) carboxylation alone is predicted to be a 28‰ depletion, on average. However, fractionation values vary between organisms, ranging from an 11‰ depletion observed in coccolithophorid algae to a 29‰ depletion observed in spinach. RuBisCO causes a kinetic isotope effect because ^{12}CO_{2} and ^{13}CO_{2} compete for the same active site and ^{13}C has an intrinsically lower reaction rate.

== ^{13}C fractionation model ==
In addition to the discriminating effects of enzymatic reactions, the diffusion of CO_{2} gas to the carboxylation site within a plant cell also influences isotopic fractionation. Depending on the type of plant (see sections below), external CO_{2} must be transported through the boundary layer and stomata and into the internal gas space of a plant cell, where it dissolves and diffuses to the chloroplast. The diffusivity of a gas is inversely proportional to the square root of its molecular reduced mass (relatively to air), causing ^{13}CO_{2} to be 4.4‰ less diffusive than ^{12}CO_{2}.

A prevailing model for fractionation of atmospheric CO_{2} in plants combines the isotope effects of the carboxylation reaction with the isotope effects from gas diffusion into the plant in the following equation:

$$\delta^{13}C_\text{sample} = \delta^{13}C_\text{atm} - a - (b-a)(c_{i}/c_{a})$$

Where:

- δ^{13}C_{sample} is the delta-value of the organism for ^{13}C composition
- δ^{13}C_{atm} is the delta-value of atmospheric CO_{2}, which is = -7.8‰
- the discrimination due to diffusion a = 4.4‰
- the carboxylation discrimination b = 30‰
- c_{a} is the partial pressure of CO_{2} in the external atmosphere, and
- c_{i} is the partial pressure of CO_{2} in the intercellular spaces.

This model, derived ab initio, generally describes fractionation of carbon in the majority of plants, which facilitate C3 carbon fixation. Modifications have been made to this model with empirical findings. However, several additional factors, not included in this general model, will increase or decrease ^{13}C fractionation across species. Such factors include the competing oxygenation reaction of RuBisCO, anatomical and temporal adaptations to enzyme activity, and variations in cell growth and geometry. The isotopic fractionations of different photosynthetic pathways are uniquely characterized by these factors, as described below.

== In C3 plants ==
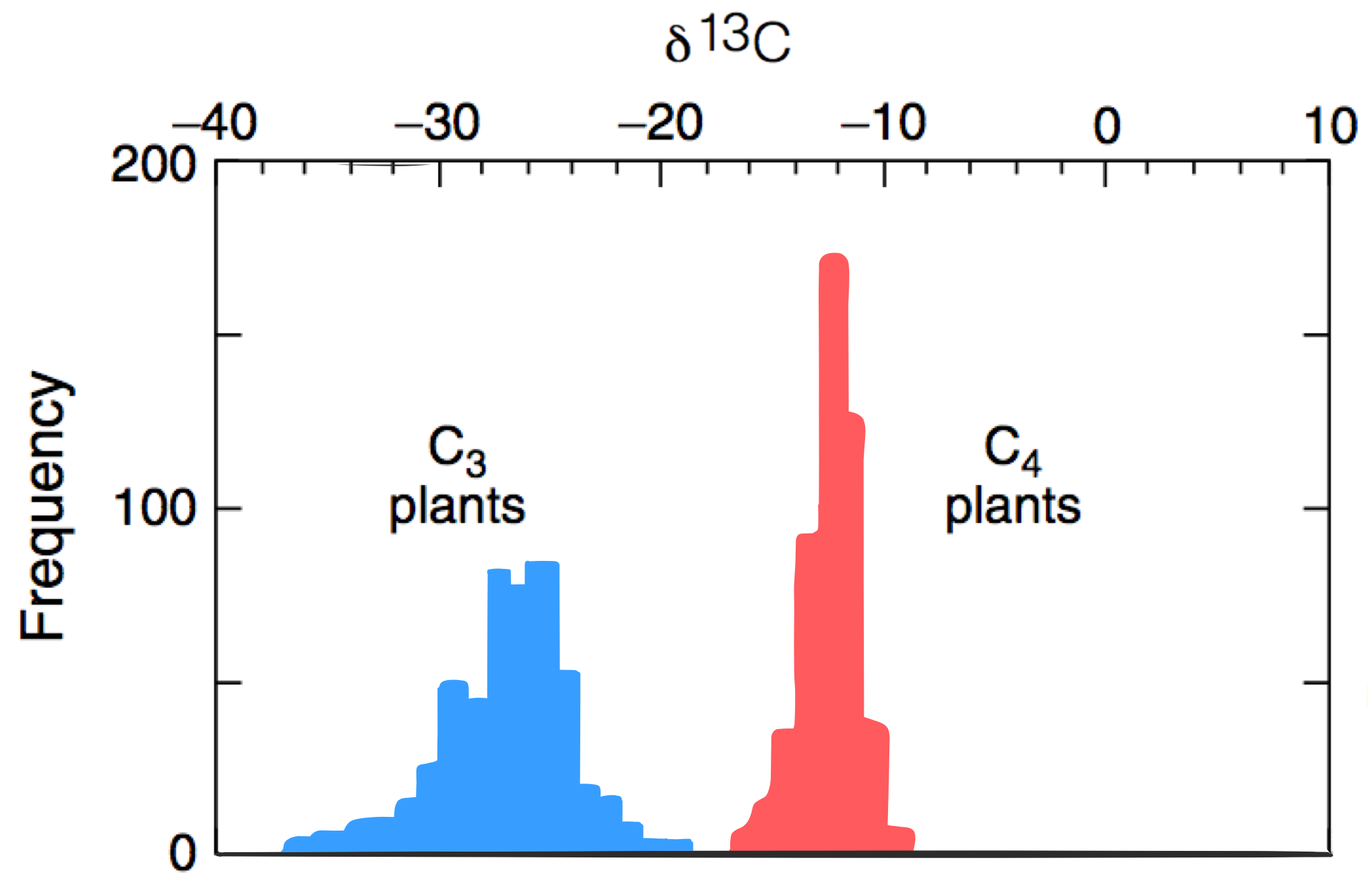
Histograms of the carbon isotope ratios from modern grasses. Note that C3 plants are roughly 14‰ depleted in ^{13}C relative to C4 plants.

A C3 plant uses C3 carbon fixation, one of the three metabolic photosynthesis pathways which also include C4 and CAM (described below). These plants are called "C3" due to the three-carbon compound (3-Phosphoglyceric acid, or 3-PGA) produced by the CO_{2} fixation mechanism in these plants. This C3 mechanism is the first step of the Calvin-Benson cycle, which converts CO_{2} and RuBP into 3-PGA.

C3 plants are the most common type of plant, and typically thrive under moderate sunlight intensity and temperatures, CO_{2} concentrations above 200 ppm, and abundant groundwater. C3 plants do not grow well in very hot or arid regions, in which C4 and CAM plants are better adapted.

The isotope fractionations in C3 carbon fixation arise from the combined effects of CO_{2} gas diffusion through the stomata of the plant, and the carboxylation via RuBisCO. Stomatal conductance discriminates against the heavier ^{13}C by 4.4‰. RuBisCO carboxylation contributes a larger discrimination of 27‰.

RuBisCO enzyme catalyzes the carboxylation of CO_{2} and the 5-carbon sugar, RuBP, into 3-phosphoglycerate, a 3-carbon compound through the following reaction:

$CO_2+H_2O+RuBP \xrightarrow[RuBisCO]{} 2(3 \mbox{-} \text{phosphoglycerate})$

The product 3-phosphoglycerate is depleted in ^{13}C due to the kinetic isotope effect of the above reaction. The overall ^{13}C fractionation for C3 photosynthesis ranges between -20 and -37‰.

The wide range of variation in delta values expressed in C3 plants is modulated by the stomatal conductance, or the rate of CO_{2} entering, or water vapor exiting, the small pores in the epidermis of a leaf. The δ^{13}C of C3 plants depends on the relationship between stomatal conductance and photosynthetic rate, which is a good proxy of water use efficiency in the leaf. C3 plants with high water-use efficiency tend to be less fractionated in ^{13}C (i.e., δ^{13}C is relatively less negative) compared to C3 plants with low water-use efficiency.

== In C4 plants ==
In the C4 pathway, a layer of mesophyll cells encircles bundle sheath cells that have large chloroplasts necessary for the Calvin cycle. A: Mesophyll Cell B: Chloroplast C: Vascular Tissue D: Bundle Sheath Cell E: Stroma F: Vascular Tissue, provides continuous source of water. 1) Carbon is fixed to produce oxaloacetate by PEP carboxylase. 2) The four carbon molecule then exits the cell and enters the chloroplasts of bundle sheath cells. 3) It is then broken down releasing carbon dioxide and producing pyruvate. Carbon dioxide combines with ribulose bisphosphate and proceeds to the Calvin Cycle.

C4 plants have developed the C4 carbon fixation pathway to conserve water loss, thus are more prevalent in hot, sunny, and dry climates. These plants differ from C3 plants because CO_{2} is initially converted to a four-carbon molecule, malate, which is shuttled to bundle sheath cells, released back as CO_{2} and only then enters the Calvin Cycle. In contrast, C3 plants directly perform the Calvin Cycle in mesophyll cells, without making use of a CO_{2} concentration method. Malate, the four-carbon compound is the namesake of "C4" photosynthesis. This pathway allows C4 photosynthesis to efficiently shuttle CO_{2} to the RuBisCO enzyme and maintain high concentrations of CO_{2} within bundle sheath cells. These cells are part of the characteristic kranz leaf anatomy, which spatially separates photosynthetic cell-types in a concentric arrangement to accumulate CO_{2} near RuBisCO.

These chemical and anatomical mechanisms improve the ability of RuBisCO to fix carbon, rather than perform its wasteful oxygenase activity. The RuBisCO oxygenase activity, called photorespiration, causes the RuBP substrate to be lost to oxygenation, and consumes energy in doing so. The adaptations of C4 plants provide an advantage over the C3 pathway, which loses efficiency due to photorespiration. The ratio of photorespiration to photosynthesis in a plant varies with environmental conditions, since decreased CO_{2} and elevated O_{2} concentrations would increase the efficiency of photorespiration. Atmospheric CO_{2} on Earth decreased abruptly at a point between 32 and 25 million years ago. This gave a selective advantage to the evolution of the C4 pathway, which can limit photorespiration rate despite the reduced ambient CO_{2}. Today, C4 plants represent roughly 5% of plant biomass on Earth, but about 23% of terrestrial carbon fixation. Types of plants which use C4 photosynthesis include grasses and economically important crops, such as maize, sugar cane, millet, and sorghum.

Isotopic fractionation differs between C4 carbon fixation and C3, due to the spatial separation in C4 plants of CO_{2} capture (in the mesophyll cells) and the Calvin cycle (in the bundle sheath cells). In C4 plants, carbon is converted to bicarbonate, fixed into oxaloacetate via the enzyme phosphoenolpyruvate (PEP) carboxylase, and is then converted to malate. The malate is transported from the mesophyll to bundle sheath cells, which are impermeable to CO_{2}. The internal CO_{2} is concentrated in these cells as malate is reoxidized then decarboxylated back into CO_{2} and pyruvate. This enables RuBisCO to perform catalysis while internal CO_{2} is sufficiently high to avoid the competing photorespiration reaction. The delta value in the C4 pathway is -12 to -16‰ depleted in ^{13}C due to the combined effects of PEP carboxylase and RuBisCO.

The isotopic discrimination in the C4 pathway varies relative to the C3 pathway due to the additional chemical conversion steps and activity of PEP carboxylase. After diffusion into the stomata, the conversion of CO_{2} to bicarbonate concentrates the heavier ^{13}C. The subsequent fixation via PEP carboxylase is thereby less depleted in ^{13}C than that from Rubisco: about 2‰ depleted in PEP carboxylase, versus 29‰ in RuBisCO. However, a portion of the isotopically heavy carbon that is fixed by PEP carboxylase leaks out of the bundle sheath cells. This limits the carbon available to RuBisCO, which in turn lowers its fractionation effect. This accounts for the overall delta value in C4 plants to be -12 to -16 ‰.

== In CAM plants ==
Plants that use Crassulacean acid metabolism, also known as CAM photosynthesis, temporally separate their chemical reactions between day and night. This strategy modulates stomatal conductance to increase water-use efficiency, so is well-adapted for arid climates. During the night, CAM plants open stomata to allow CO_{2} to enter the cell and undergo fixation into organic acids that are stored in vacuoles. This carbon is released to the Calvin cycle during the day, when stomata are closed to prevent water loss, and the light reactions can drive the necessary ATP and NADPH production. This pathway differs from C4 photosynthesis because CAM plants separate carbon by storing fixed CO_{2} in vesicles at night, then transporting it for use during the day. Thus, CAM plants temporally concentrate CO_{2} to improve RuBisCO efficiency, whereas C4 plants spatially concentrate CO_{2} in bundle sheath cells. The distribution of plants which use CAM photosynthesis includes epiphytes (e.g., orchids, bromeliads) and xerophytes (e.g., succulents, cacti).

In Crassulacean acid metabolism, isotopic fractionation combines the effects of the C3 pathway in the daytime and the C4 pathway in the nighttime. At night, when temperature and water loss are lower, the CO_{2} diffuses through the stomata and produce malate via phosphoenolpyruvate carboxylase. During the following day, stomata are closed, malate is decarboxylated, and CO_{2} is fixed by RuBisCO. This process alone is similar to that of C4 plants and yields characteristic C4 fractionation values of approximately -11‰. However, in the afternoon, CAM plants may open their stomata and perform C3 photosynthesis. In daytime alone, CAM plants have approximately -28‰ fractionation, characteristic of C3 plants. These combined effects provide δ^{13}C values for CAM plants in the range of -10 to -20‰.

The ^{13}C to ^{12}C ratio in CAM plants can indicate the temporal separation of CO_{2} fixation, which is the extent of biomass derived from nocturnal CO_{2} fixation relative to diurnal CO_{2} fixation. This distinction can be made because PEP carboxylase, the enzyme responsible for net CO_{2} uptake at night, discriminates ^{13}C less than RuBisCO, which is responsible to daytime CO_{2} uptake. CAM plants which fix CO_{2} primarily at night would be predicted to show δ^{13}C values more similar to C4 plants, whereas daytime CO_{2} fixation would show δ^{13}C values more similar to C3 plants.

== In phytoplankton ==
In contrast to terrestrial plants, where CO_{2} diffusion in air is relatively fast and typically not limiting, diffusion of dissolved CO_{2} in water is considerably slower and can often limit carbon fixation in phytoplankton. As gaseous CO_{2(g)} is dissolved into aqueous CO_{2(aq)}, it is fractionated by both kinetic and equilibrium effects that are temperature-dependent. Relative to plants, the dissolved CO_{2} source for phytoplankton can be enriched in ^{13}C by about 8‰ from atmospheric CO_{2}.

Isotope fractionation of ^{13}C by phytoplankton photosynthesis is affected by the diffusion of extracellular aqueous CO_{2} into the cell, the RuBisCO-dependent cell growth rate, and the cell geometry and surface area. The use of bicarbonate and carbon-concentrating mechanisms in phytoplankton distinguishes the isotopic fractionation from plant photosynthetic pathways.

The difference between intracellular and extracellular CO_{2} concentrations reflects the CO_{2} demand of a phytoplankton cell, which is dependent on its growth rate. The ratio of carbon demand to supply governs the diffusion of CO_{2} into the cell, and is negatively correlated with the magnitude of the carbon fractionation by phytoplankton. Combined, these relationships allow the fractionation between CO_{2(aq)} and phytoplankton biomass to be used to estimate the phytoplankton growth rates.

However, growth rate alone does not account for observed fractionation. The flux of CO_{2(aq)} into and out of a cell is roughly proportional to the cell surface area, and the cell carbon biomass varies as a function of cell volume. Phytoplankton geometry that maximizes surface area to volume should have larger isotopic fractionation from photosynthesis.

The biochemical characteristics of phytoplankton are similar to C3 plants, whereas the gas exchange characteristics more closely resemble the C4 strategy. More specifically, phytoplankton improve the efficiency of their primary carbon-fixing enzyme, RuBisCO, with carbon concentrating mechanisms (CCM), just as C4 plants accumulate CO_{2} in the bundle sheath cells. Different forms of CCM in phytoplankton include the active uptake of bicarbonate and CO_{2} through the cell membrane, the active transport of inorganic carbon from the cellular membrane to the chloroplasts, and active, unidirectional conversion of CO_{2} to bicarbonate. The parameters affecting ^{13}C fractionation in phytoplankton contribute to δ^{13}C values between -18 and -25‰.

== See also ==
- RuBisCO
- Isotope geochemistry
- Intrinsic KIE of RuBisCO
- Paleoclimatology
