= Compensation point =

Light point for photosynthesis

External image
- Light and CO_{2} curves for notoginseng plants at different nitrogen levels. The compensation points is where the photosynthetic rate becomes zero.

The light compensation point (I_{c}) is the light intensity on the light curve where the rate of photosynthesis exactly matches the rate of cellular respiration. At this point, the uptake of CO_{2} through photosynthetic pathways is equal to the respiratory release of carbon dioxide, and the uptake of O_{2} by respiration is equal to the photosynthetic release of oxygen. The concept of compensation points in general may be applied to other photosynthetic variables, the most important being that of CO_{2} concentration – CO_{2} compensation point (Γ).Interval of time in day time when light intensity is low due to which net gaseous exchange is zero is called as compensation point.

In assimilation terms, at the compensation point, the net carbon dioxide assimilation is zero. Leaves release CO_{2} by photorespiration and cellular respiration, but CO_{2} is also converted into carbohydrate by photosynthesis. Assimilation is therefore the difference in the rate of these processes. At a given partial pressure of CO_{2} (0.343 hPa in 1980 atmosphere), there is an irradiation at which the net assimilation of CO_{2} is zero. For instance, in the early morning and late evenings, the light compensation point I_{c} may be reached as photosynthetic activity decreases and respiration increases. The concentration of CO_{2} also affects the rates of photosynthesis and photorespiration. Higher CO_{2} concentrations favour photosynthesis whereas low CO_{2} concentrations favor photorespiration, producing a CO_{2} compensation point Γ for a given irradiation.

== Light compensation point ==
As defined above, the light compensation point I_{c} is when no net carbon assimilation occurs. At this point, the organism is neither consuming nor building biomass. The net gaseous exchange is also zero at this point.

I_{c} is a practical value that can be reached during early mornings and early evenings. Respiration is relatively constant with regard to light, whereas photosynthesis depends on the intensity of sunlight.

=== Depth ===
For aquatic plants where the level of light at any given depth is roughly constant for most of the day, the compensation point is the depth at which light penetrating the water creates the same balanced effect.

== CO_{2} compensation point ==
The CO_{2} compensation point (Γ) is the CO_{2} concentration at which the rate of photosynthesis exactly matches the rate of respiration. There is a significant difference in Γ between C_{3} plants and C_{4} plants: on land, the typical value for Γ in a C_{3} plant ranges from 40–100 μmol/mol, while in C_{4} plants the values are lower at 3–10 μmol/mol. Plants with a weaker CCM, such as C2 photosynthesis, may display an intermediate value at 25 μmol/mol.

The μmol/mol unit may alternatively be expressed as the partial pressure of CO_{2} in pascals; for atmospheric conditions, 1μmol/mol = 1 ppm ≈ 0.1 Pa. For modeling of photosynthesis, the more important variable is the CO_{2} compensation point in the absence of mitochondrial respiration, also known as the CO_{2} photocompensation point (Γ*), the biochemical CO_{2} compensation point of Rubisco. It may be measured by whole-leaf isotopic gas exchange, or be estimated in the Laisk method using an intermediate "apparent" value of C* with correction. C* approximates Γ* in the absence of carbon refixation, i.e. carbon fixation from photorespiration products. In C_{4} plants, both values are lower than their C_{3} counterparts. In C2 plants that operate by refixation, only C* is significantly lower.

As it is not yet common to routinely change the CO_{2} concentration of air, the concentration points are largely theoretical derived from modeling and extrapolation, though they do hold up well in these applications. Both Γ and Γ* are linearly related to the partial pressure of oxygen (p(O_{2})) due to the side reaction of Rubisco. Γ is also related to temperature due to the temperature-dependence of respiration rates. It is also related to irradiation, as light is required to produce RuBP (ribulose-1,5-bisphosphate), the electron acceptor for Rubisco. At normal irradiation, there would almost always be enough RuBP; but at low irradiation, lack of RuBP decreases the photosynthetic activity and therefore affects Γ.

== The marine environment ==
Respiration occurs by both plants and animals throughout the water column, resulting in the destruction, or usage, of organic matter, but photosynthesis can only take place via photosynthetic algae in the presence of light, nutrients and CO_{2}. In well-mixed water columns plankton are evenly distributed, but a net production only occurs above the compensation depth. Below the compensation depth there is a net loss of organic matter. The total population of photosynthetic organisms cannot increase if the loss exceeds the net production.

The compensation depth between photosynthesis and respiration of phytoplankton in the ocean must be dependent on some factors: the illumination at the surface, the transparency of the water, the biological character of the plankton present, and the temperature. The compensation point was found nearer to the surface as you move closer to the coast. It is also lower in the winter seasons in the Baltic Sea according to a study that examined the compensation point of multiple photosynthetic species. The blue portion of the visible spectrum, between 455 and 495 nanometers, dominates light at the compensation depth.

A concern regarding the concept of the compensation point is it assumes that phytoplankton remain at a fixed depth throughout a 24-hour period (time frame in which compensation depth is measured), but phytoplankton experience displacement due to isopycnals moving them tens of meters.

== See also ==
- Photophosphorylation
- Critical depth
- CO2 fertilization effect
