= C3 carbon fixation =

Series of interconnected biochemical reactions

Calvin–Benson cycle

C_{3} carbon fixation is the most common of three metabolic pathways for carbon fixation in photosynthesis, the other two being C_{4} and CAM. This process converts carbon dioxide and ribulose bisphosphate (RuBP, a 5-carbon sugar) into two molecules of 3-phosphoglycerate through the following reaction:

CO_{2} + H_{2}O + RuBP → (2) 3-phosphoglycerate

This reaction was first discovered by Melvin Calvin, Andrew Benson and James Bassham in 1950. C_{3} carbon fixation occurs in all plants as the first step of the Calvin–Benson cycle. (In C_{4} and CAM plants, carbon dioxide is drawn out of malate and into this reaction rather than directly from the air.)

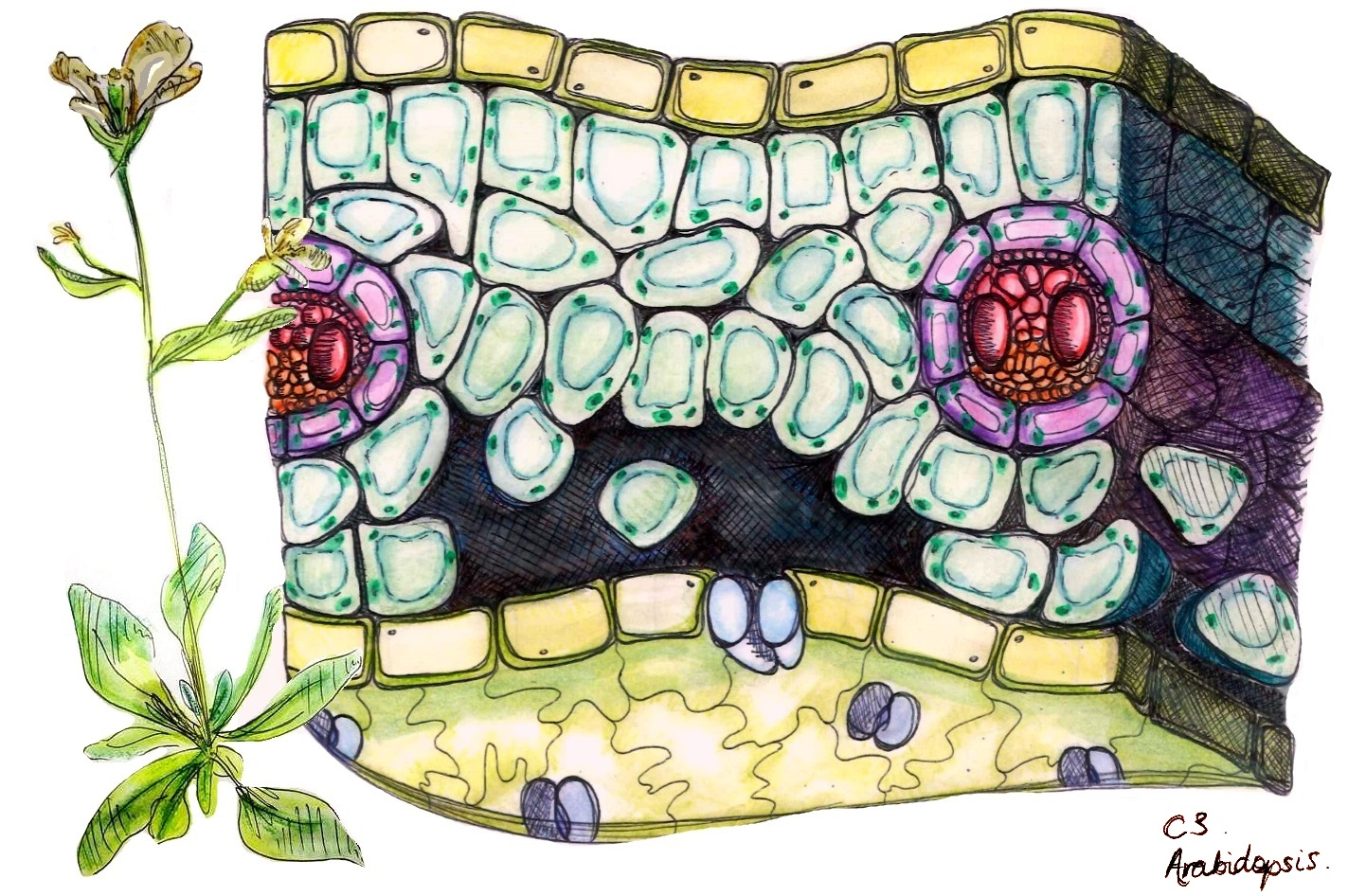
Cross section of a C_{3} plant, specifically of an Arabidopsis thaliana leaf. Vascular bundles shown. Drawing based on microscopic images courtesy of Cambridge University Plant Sciences Department.

Plants that survive solely on C_{3} fixation (C_{3} plants) tend to thrive in areas where sunlight intensity is moderate, temperatures are moderate, carbon dioxide concentrations are around 200 ppm or higher, and groundwater is plentiful. The C_{3} plants, originating during Mesozoic and Paleozoic eras, predate the C_{4} plants and still represent approximately 95% of Earth's plant biomass, including important food crops such as rice, wheat, soybeans and barley.

C_{3} plants cannot grow in very hot areas at today's atmospheric CO_{2} level (significantly depleted during hundreds of millions of years from above 5000 ppm) because RuBisCO incorporates more oxygen into RuBP as temperatures increase. This leads to photorespiration (also known as the oxidative photosynthetic carbon cycle, or C2 photosynthesis), which leads to a net loss of carbon and nitrogen from the plant and can therefore limit growth.

C_{3} plants lose up to 97% of the water taken up through their roots by transpiration. In dry areas, C_{3} plants shut their stomata to reduce water loss, but this stops CO_{2} from entering the leaves and therefore reduces the concentration of CO_{2} in the leaves. This lowers the CO_{2}:O_{2} ratio and therefore also increases photorespiration. C_{4} and CAM plants have adaptations that allow them to survive in hot and dry areas, and they can therefore out-compete C_{3} plants in these areas.

The isotopic signature of C_{3} plants shows higher degree of ^{13}C depletion than the C_{4} plants, due to variation in fractionation of carbon isotopes in oxygenic photosynthesis across plant types. Specifically, C_{3} plants do not have PEP carboxylase like C_{4} plants, allowing them to only utilize ribulose-1,5-bisphosphate carboxylase (Rubisco) to fix CO_{2} through the Calvin cycle. The enzyme Rubisco largely discriminates against carbon isotopes, evolving to only bind to ^{12}C isotope compared to ^{13}C (the heavier isotope), contributing to more ^{13}C depletion seen in C_{3} plants compared to C_{4} plants especially since the C_{4} pathway uses PEP carboxylase in addition to Rubisco.

== Variations ==
Not all C3 carbon fixation pathways operate at the same efficiency.

=== Refixation ===
Bamboos and the related rice have an improved C3 efficiency. This improvement might be due to its ability to recapture CO_{2} produced during photorespiration, a behavior termed "carbon refixation". These plants achieve refixation by growing chloroplast extensions called "stromules" around the stroma in mesophyll cells, so that any photorespired CO_{2} from the mitochondria has to pass through the RuBisCO-filled chloroplast.

Refixation is also performed by a wide variety of plants. The common approach involving growing a bigger bundle sheath leads down to C2 photosynthesis.

=== Synthetic glycolate pathway ===
C3 carbon fixation is prone to photorespiration (PR) during dehydration, accumulating toxic glycolate products. In the 2000s scientists used computer simulation combined with an optimization algorithm to figure out what parts of the metabolic pathway may be tuned to improve photosynthesis. According to simulation, improving glycolate metabolism would help significantly to reduce photorespiration.

Instead of optimizing specific enzymes on the PR pathway for glycolate degradation, South et al. decided to bypass PR altogether. In 2019, they transferred Chlamydomonas reinhardtii glycolate dehydrogenase and Cucurbita maxima malate synthase into the chloroplast of tobacco (a C_{3} model organism). These enzymes, plus the chloroplast's own, create a catabolic cycle: acetyl-CoA combines with glyoxylate to form malate, which is then split into pyruvate and CO_{2}; the former in turn splits into acetyl-CoA and CO_{2}. By forgoing all transport among organelles, all the CO_{2} released will go into increasing the CO_{2} concentration in the chloroplast, helping with refixation. The end result is 24% more biomass. An alternative using E. coli glycerate pathway produced a smaller improvement of 13%. They are now working on moving this optimization into other C_{3} crops like wheat.
