= CA1P =

CA1P may refer to:

- Combretastatin A1 diphosphate, a drug under phase I clinical trial
- 2-Carboxy-D-arabitinol 1-phosphate, a substrate of CA1P-phosphatase and an inhibitor of the enzyme RuBisCO
