= C6H13O10P =

The molecular formula C_{6}H_{13}O_{10}P (molar mass: 276.134 g/mol) may refer to:

- 2-Carboxy-D-arabitinol 1-phosphate
- 6-Phosphogluconic acid
