= Phosphoenolpyruvate carboxylase =

Class of enzymes

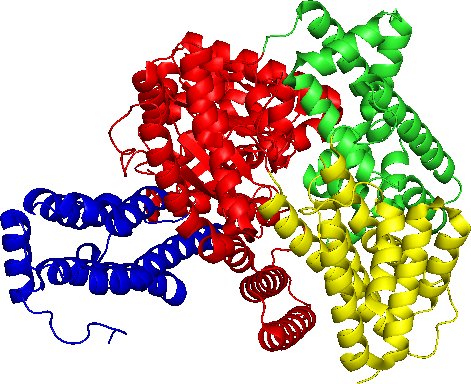
- the Phosphoenolpyruvate (PEP) carboxylase single subunit structure (generated by PyMOL)]

Identifiers
- EC no.: 4.1.1.31
- CAS no.: 9067-77-0

Databases
- BRENDA: enzyme data
- ExPASy: NiceZyme view
- KEGG: enzyme entry
- MetaCyc: metabolic pathway
- Rhea: reactions
- PDB structures: RCSB PDB PDBe PDBsum
- Gene Ontology: AmiGO / QuickGO
Search
- PMC: articles
- PubMed: articles
- NCBI: proteins

Phosphoenolpyruvate carboxylase

Identifiers
- Symbol: PEPcase
- Pfam: PF00311
- InterPro: IPR001449
- PROSITE: PDOC00330
- SCOP2: 1fiy / SCOPe / SUPFAM
Available protein structures:
- PDB: 3ZGE IPR001449 PF00311 (ECOD; PDBsum)
- AlphaFold: IPR001449; PF00311

Phosphoenolpyruvate carboxylase (also known as PEP carboxylase, PEPCase, or PEPC; EC 4.1.1.31, PDB ID: 3ZGE) is an enzyme in the family of carboxy-lyases found in plants and some bacteria that catalyzes the carboxylation of phosphoenolpyruvic acid to form the four-carbon compound, oxaloacetic acid, and inorganic phosphate (P_{i}):

phosphoenolpyruvic acid
CO_{2}
P_{i}
oxaloacetic acid

This reaction is used for carbon fixation in CAM (crassulacean acid metabolism) and C_{4} organisms, as well as to regulate flux through the citric acid cycle (also known as Krebs or TCA cycle) in bacteria and plants. The enzyme structure and its two step catalytic, irreversible mechanism have been well studied. PEP carboxylase is highly regulated, both by phosphorylation and allostery.

== Enzyme structure ==
The PEP carboxylase enzyme is present in plants and some types of bacteria, but not in fungi or animals (including humans). The genes vary between organisms, but are strictly conserved around the active and allosteric sites discussed in the mechanism and regulation sections. Tertiary structure of the enzyme is also conserved.

The crystal structure of PEP carboxylase in multiple organisms, including Zea mays (maize), and Escherichia coli has been determined. The overall enzyme exists as a dimer-of-dimers: two identical subunits closely interact to form a dimer through salt bridges between arginine (R438 - exact positions may vary depending on the origin of the gene) and glutamic acid (E433) residues. This dimer assembles (more loosely) with another of its kind to form the four subunit complex. The monomer subunits are mainly composed of alpha helices (65%), and have a mass of 106kDa each. The sequence length is about 966 amino acids.

The enzyme active site is not completely characterized. It includes a conserved aspartic acid (D564) and a glutamic acid (E566) residue that non-covalently bind a divalent metal cofactor ion through the carboxylic acid functional groups. This metal ion can be magnesium, manganese or cobalt depending on the organism, and its role is to coordinate the phosphoenolpyruvate molecule as well as the reaction intermediates. A histidine (H138) residue at the active site is believed to facilitate proton transfer during the catalytic mechanism.

== Enzyme mechanism ==
The mechanism of PEP carboxylase has been well studied. The enzymatic mechanism of forming oxaloacetate is very exergonic, and thereby irreversible, in biochemical standard conditions; the biological standard Gibbs free energy change (∆G°’) is −30 kJ⋅mol^{−1}. The substrates and cofactor bind in the following order: metal cofactor (either Co^{2+}, Mg^{2+}, or Mn^{2+}), PEP, bicarbonate (HCO_{3}^{–}). The mechanism proceeds in two major steps, as described below and shown in figure 2:

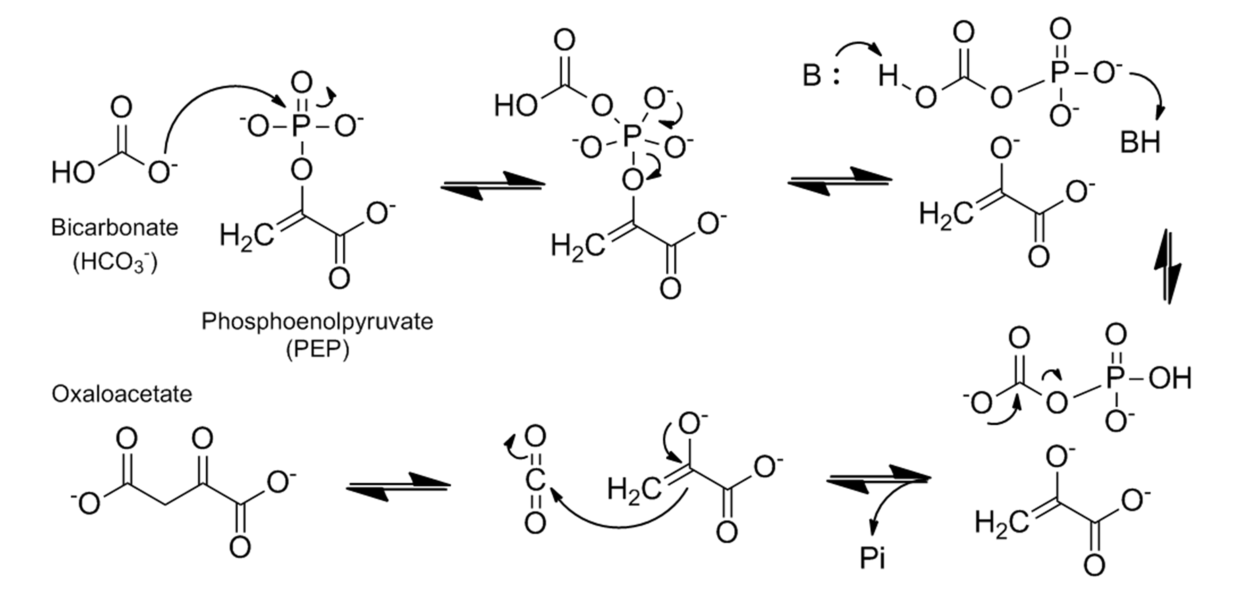
Figure 2: the Phosphoenolpyruvate (PEP) carboxylase enzymatic mechanism converting bicarbonate and PEP to oxaloacetate and phosphate.

1. The bicarbonate acts as a nucleophile to attack the phosphate group in PEP. This results in the splitting of PEP into a carboxyphosphate and the (very reactive) enolate form of pyruvate.
2. Proton transfer takes place at the carboxyphosphate. This is most likely modulated by a histidine (H138) residue that first deprotonates the carboxy side, and then, as an acid, protonates the phosphate part. The carboxyphosphate then exothermically decomposes into carbon dioxide and inorganic phosphate, at this point making this an irreversible reaction. Finally, after the decomposition, the carbon dioxide is attacked by the enolate to form oxaloacetate.

The metal cofactor is necessary to coordinate the enolate and carbon dioxide intermediates; the CO_{2} molecule is only lost 3% of the time. The active site is hydrophobic to exclude water, since the carboxyphosphate intermediate is susceptible to hydrolysis.

== Function ==
The three most important roles that PEP carboxylase plays in plants and bacteria metabolism are in the C_{4} cycle, the CAM cycle, and the citric acid cycle biosynthesis flux.

The primary mechanism of carbon dioxide assimilation in plants is through the enzyme ribulose-1,5-bisphosphate carboxylase/oxygenase (also known as RuBisCO), that adds CO_{2} to ribulose-1,5-bisphosphate (a 5 carbon sugar), to form two molecules of 3-phosphoglycerate (2×3 carbon sugars). However, at higher temperatures and lower CO_{2} concentrations, RuBisCO adds oxygen instead of carbon dioxide, to form the unusable product glycolate in a process called photorespiration. To prevent this wasteful process, some plants increase the local CO_{2} concentration in a process called the C_{4} cycle. PEP carboxylase plays the key role of binding CO_{2} in the form of bicarbonate with PEP to create oxaloacetate in the mesophyll tissue. This is then converted back to pyruvate (through a malate intermediate), to release the CO_{2} in the deeper layer of bundle sheath cells for carbon fixation by RuBisCO and the Calvin cycle. Pyruvate is converted back to PEP in the mesophyll cells, and the cycle begins again, thus actively pumping CO_{2}.

The second important and very similar biological significance of PEP carboxylase is in the CAM cycle. This cycle is common in organisms living in arid habitats. Plants cannot afford to open stomata during the day to take in CO_{2}, as they would lose too much water by transpiration. Instead, stomata open at night, when water evaporation is minimal, and take in CO_{2} by fixing with PEP to form oxaloacetate though PEP carboxylase. Oxaloacetate is converted to malate by malate dehydrogenase, and stored for use during the day when the light dependent reaction generates energy (mainly in the form of ATP) and reducing equivalents such as NADPH to run the Calvin cycle.

Third, PEP carboxylase is significant in non-photosynthetic metabolic pathways. Figure 3 shows this metabolic flow (and its regulation). Similar to pyruvate carboxylase, PEP carboxylase replenishes oxaloacetate in the citric acid cycle. At the end of glycolysis, PEP is converted to pyruvate, which is converted to acetyl-coenzyme-A (acetyl-CoA), which enters the citric acid cycle by reacting with oxaloacetate to form citrate. To increase flux through the cycle, some of the PEP is converted to oxaloacetate by PEP carboxylase. Since the citric acid cycle intermediates provide a hub for metabolism, increasing flux is important for the biosynthesis of many molecules, such as for example amino acids.

== Regulation ==
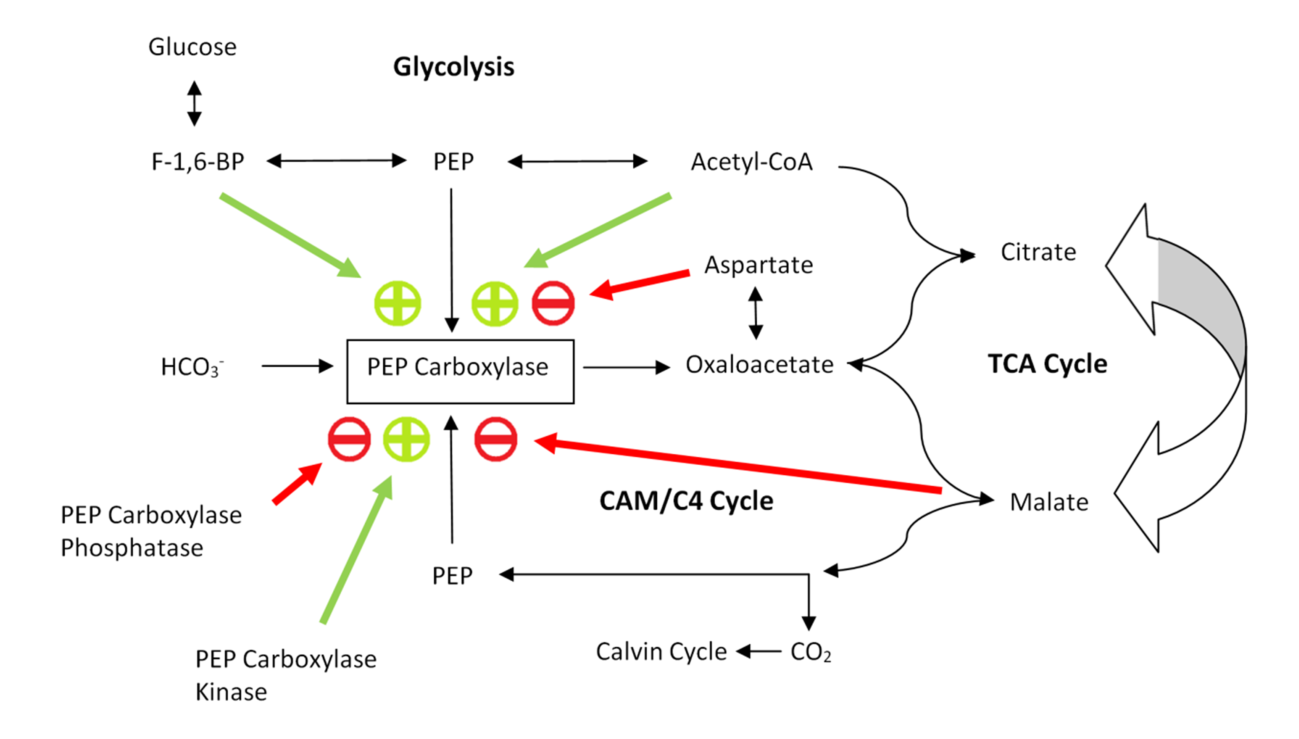
Figure 3: the Phosphoenolpyruvate (PEP) carboxylase regulation pathways

PEP carboxylase is mainly subject to two levels of regulation: phosphorylation and allostery. Figure 3 shows a schematic of the regulatory mechanism.

Phosphorylation by phosphoenolpyruvate carboxylase kinase turns the enzyme on, whereas phosphoenolpyruvate carboxylase phosphatase turns it back off. Both kinase and phosphatase are regulated by transcription. It is further believed that malate acts as a feedback inhibitor of kinase expression levels, and as an activator for phosphatase expression (transcription). Since oxaloacetate is converted to malate in CAM and C_{4} organisms, high concentrations of malate activate phosphatase expression - the phosphatase subsequently de-phosphorylates and thus de-actives PEP carboxylase, leading to no further accumulation of oxaloacetate and thus no further conversion of oxaloacetate to malate. Hence malate production is down-regulated.

The main allosteric inhibitors of PEP carboxylase are the carboxylic acids malate (weak) and aspartate (strong). Since malate is formed in the next step of the CAM and C_{4} cycles after PEP carboxylase catalyses the condensation of CO_{2} and PEP to oxaloacetate, this works as a feedback inhibition pathway. Oxaloacetate and aspartate are easily inter-convertible through a transaminase mechanism; thus high concentrations of aspartate are also a pathway of feedback inhibition of PEP carboxylase.

The main allosteric activators of PEP carboxylase are acetyl-CoA and fructose-1,6-bisphosphate (F-1,6-BP). Both molecules are indicators of increased glycolysis levels, and thus positive feed-forward effectors of PEP carboxylase. They signal the need to produce oxaloacetate to allow more flux through the citric acid cycle. Additionally, increased glycolysis means a higher supply of PEP is available, and thus more storage capacity for binding CO_{2} in transport to the Calvin cycle. It is also noteworthy that the negative effectors aspartate competes with the positive effector acetyl-CoA, suggesting that they share an allosteric binding site.

Studies have shown that energy equivalents such as AMP, ADP and ATP have no significant effect on PEP carboxylase.

The magnitudes of the allosteric effects of these different molecules on PEP carboxylase activity depend on individual organisms.
