= 2-Phosphoglycolate =

Names
- Preferred IUPAC name Carboxylatomethyl phosphate

Identifiers
CAS Number	acid: 13147-57-4
3D model (JSmol)	Interactive image; acid: Interactive image
ChEBI	CHEBI:58033; acid: CHEBI:17150
ChemSpider	acid: 514
ECHA InfoCard	100.032.789
EC Number	acid: 236-084-2
PubChem CID	24916760; acid: 529
UNII	acid: H8593JOP13
CompTox Dashboard (EPA)	DTXSID60157064
- InChI: InChI=1S/C2H5O6P/c3-2(4)1-8-9(5,6)7/h1H2,(H,3,4)(H2,5,6,7)/p-3 Key: ASCFNMCAHFUBCO-UHFFFAOYSA-K; acid: InChI=1S/C2H5O6P/c3-2(4)1-8-9(5,6)7/h1H2,(H,3,4)(H2,5,6,7) Key: ASCFNMCAHFUBCO-UHFFFAOYSA-N
- SMILES: C(C(=O)[O-])OP(=O)([O-])[O-]; acid: C(C(=O)O)OP(=O)(O)O

Properties
Chemical formula	C_{2}H_{2}O_{6}P^{−3}
Molar mass	153.007 g·mol^{−1}
- Except where otherwise noted, data are given for materials in their standard state (at 25 °C [77 °F], 100 kPa). Infobox references

2-Phosphoglycolate (chemical formula C_{2}H_{2}O_{6}P^{3-}; also known as phosphoglycolate, 2-PG, or PG) is a natural metabolic product of the oxygenase reaction mediated by the enzyme ribulose 1,5-bisphosphate carboxylase (RuBisCo).

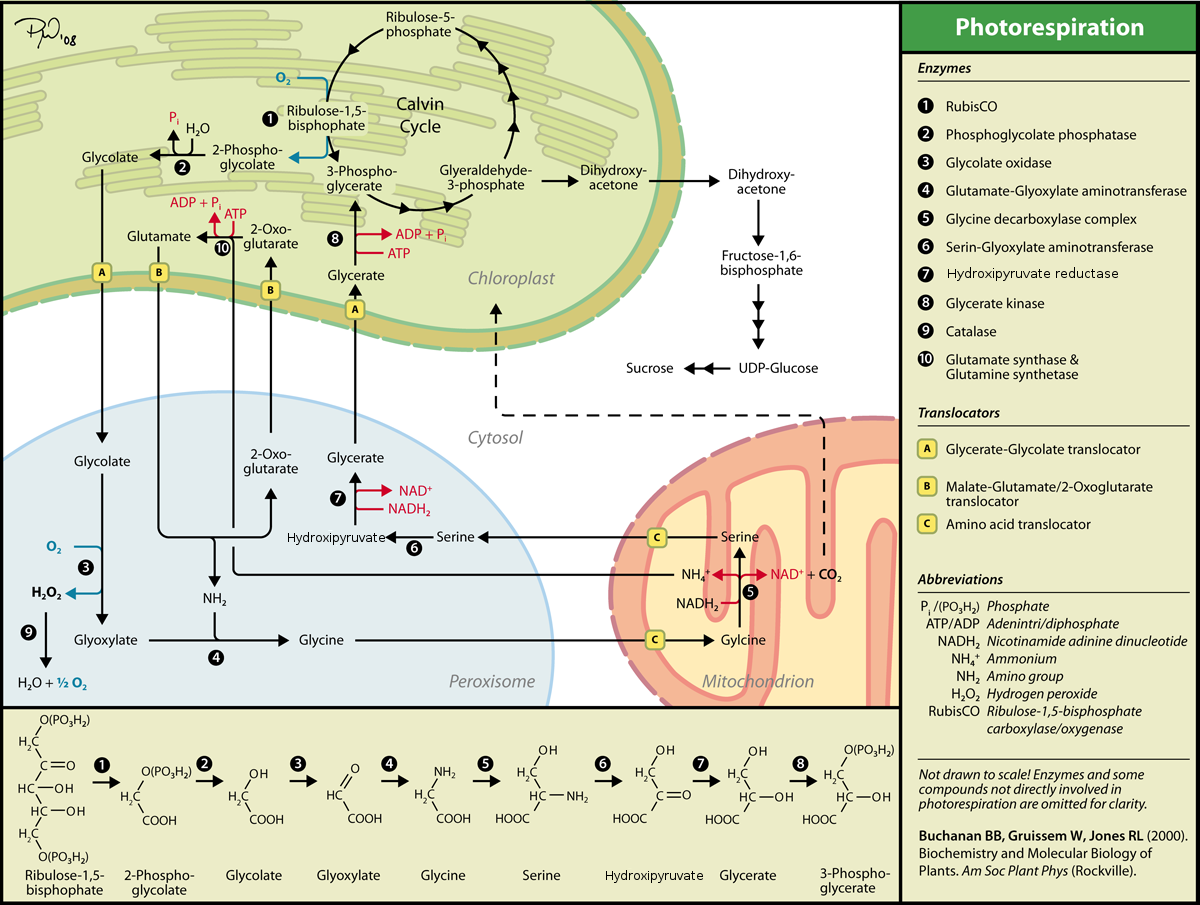
Photorespiration serves as a salvage pathway that converts 2-PG into non-toxic metabolites. Contrary to the Calvin cycle, this pathway is responsible a net loss of previously fixed carbon. It also serves as sink for ATP and NADH.

== Synthesis ==
RuBisCo catalyzes the fixation of atmospheric carbon dioxide in the chloroplasts of plants. It uses ribulose 1,5-bisphosphate (RuBP) as substrate and facilitates carboxylation at the C2 carbon via an endiolate intermediate. The two three-carbon products (3-phosphoglycerate) are subsequently fed into the Calvin cycle. Atmospheric oxygen competes with this reaction. In a process called photorespiration RuBisCo can also catalyze addition of atmospheric oxygen to the C2 carbon of RuBP forming a high energy hydroperoxide intermediate that decomposes into 2-phosphoglycolate and 3-phosphoglycerate. Despite a higher energy barrier for the oxygenation reaction compared to carboxylation, photorespiration accounts for up to 25% of RuBisCo turnover in C3 plants.

== Biological role ==
=== Plants ===
In plants, 2-phosphoglycolate has a potentially toxic effect as it inhibits a number of metabolic pathways. The activities of important enzymes in the central carbon metabolism of the chloroplast such as triose-phosphate isomerase, phosphofructokinase, or sedoheptulose 1,7-bisphosphate phosphatase show a significant decrease in the presence of 2-PG. Therefore, degradation of 2-PG during photorespiration is important for cellular homeostasis.

Photorespiration is the main way of chloroplasts to rid themselves of 2-PG. However, this pathway comes at a decreased return on investment ratio as 2-PG is transformed to 3-phosphoglycerate in an elaborate salvage pathway at the cost of one equivalent of NADH and ATP, respectively. In addition, this salvage pathway loses ½ equivalent of previously fixed carbon dioxide and releases ½ equivalent of toxic ammonia per molecule of 2-PG. This leads to a net loss of carbon in photorespiration, making it much less efficient than the Calvin cycle.

However, this salvage pathway can also act as a cellular energy sink, preventing the chloroplastidal electron transport chain from over reduction. It is believed that this pathway also plays a role in improving the abiotic stress response of plants.

=== Bacteria ===
2-PG is similarly a toxic product in bacteria. Bacteria remove this substance using a glycerate pathway. This shorter pathway branches out from photorespiration after the formation of glyoxylate, proceeding to use glycoxylate carboxylase and tartronic semialdehyde reductase to rejoin at the formation of glycerate. Some Cyanobacteria can use a combination of photorespiration and glycerate pathways.

Transferring the shorter glycerate pathway into plant chloroplasts, combined with stopping chloroplastic export of glycolate, results in higher photosynthetic efficiency. In tobacco, the biomass increases by 13%, not as good a result as a designed pathway.

=== Animals ===
Although mainly produced in plants, 2-PG also plays a role in mammalian metabolism, though the source of 2-PG in mammals remains incompletely understood. It is thought that the processing of breaks in the DNA-strand produces small amounts of 2-PG, but other processes may yield 2-PG as well. The phosphatase subunit of bisphosphoglycerate mutase, an enzyme found in red blood cells, shows an increase in activity by up three orders of magnitude in the presence of 2-PG, resulting in an increase of the oxygen affinity of hemoglobin.

== Agricultural significance ==
RuBisCo has been a potential target for bioengineers for agricultural purposes. A decrease in the oxygenation of RuBP may result in a boost in the efficiency of carbon assimilation in crops such as rice or wheat and therefore increase their net biomass production. Attempts have been made to artificially alter the protein structure of RuBisCo to enhance its catalytic turnover rate. Mutations in the L-subunit of the enzyme, for example, have been shown to increase both the catalytic turnover rate and RuBisCos affinity for carbon dioxide
