= Light curve (botany) =

Graph of photosynthetic response against light intensity

In botany, a light curve shows the photosynthetic response of leaf tissue or algal communities to varying light intensities. The shape of the curve illustrates the principle of limiting factors; in low light levels, the rate of photosynthesis is limited by the concentration of chlorophyll and the efficiency of the light-dependent reactions, but in higher light levels it is limited by the efficiency of RuBisCo and the availability of carbon dioxide. The point on the curve where these two differing slopes meet is called the light saturation point and is where the light-dependent reactions are producing more ATP and NADPH than can be utilized by the light-independent reactions. Since photosynthesis is also limited by ambient carbon dioxide levels, light curves are often repeated at several different constant carbon dioxide concentrations.
