= 2-Carboxy-D-arabitinol 1-phosphate =

Names
- IUPAC name 2-C-[(Phosphonooxy)methyl]-D-ribonic acid
- Systematic IUPAC name (2R,3R,4R)-2,3,4,5-Tetrahydroxy-2-[(phosphonooxy)methyl]pentanoic acid
- Other names CA1P

Identifiers
CAS Number	106777-19-9
3D model (JSmol)	Interactive image
ChEBI	CHEBI:17541
ChemSpider	114616
KEGG	C04234
PubChem CID	129417
UNII	ZFW7MEG9NT
CompTox Dashboard (EPA)	DTXSID80147765
- InChI: InChI=1S/C6H13O10P/c7-1-3(8)4(9)6(12,5(10)11)2-16-17(13,14)15/h3-4,7-9,12H,1-2H2,(H,10,11)(H2,13,14,15)/t3-,4-,6-/m1/s1 Key: UJTMIRNFEXKGMS-ZMIZWQJLSA-N
- SMILES: OC[C@@H](O)[C@@H](O)[C@](O)(COP(O)(O)=O)C(O)=O

Properties
Chemical formula	C_{6}H_{13}O_{10}P
Molar mass	276.134 g·mol^{−1}
- Except where otherwise noted, data are given for materials in their standard state (at 25 °C [77 °F], 100 kPa). Infobox references

2-Carboxy-D-arabitinol 1-phosphate (CA1P) is a molecule produced in plants that inhibits RuBisCO, a key enzyme in the Calvin cycle and carbon fixation. In dark conditions, this molecule binds to RuBisCO, preventing it from participating in chemical reactions. As the amount of light present increases, CA1P levels decrease, freeing RuBisCO's reactive ends, allowing more of the molecules to participate in chemical reactions. It is removed from Rubisco's active sites through the action of Rubisco activase (Rca) and is broken down by the enzyme 2-carboxy-D-arabinitol-1-phosphatase into 2-carboxy-D-arabinitol.
