= 2-Carboxy-D-arabinitol-1-phosphatase =

Class of enzymes

Identifiers
- EC no.: 3.1.3.63
- CAS no.: 122319-88-4

Databases
- IntEnz: IntEnz view
- BRENDA: BRENDA entry
- ExPASy: NiceZyme view
- KEGG: KEGG entry
- MetaCyc: metabolic pathway
- PRIAM: profile
- PDB structures: RCSB PDB PDBe PDBsum
- Gene Ontology: AmiGO / QuickGO
Search
- PMC: articles
- PubMed: articles
- NCBI: proteins

The enzyme 2-carboxy-D-arabinitol-1-phosphatase (CA1Pase; EC 3.1.3.63) catalyzes the reaction

2-carboxy-D-arabinitol 1-phosphate + H_{2}O $\rightleftharpoons$ 2-carboxy-D-arabinitol + phosphate

This enzyme belongs to the family of hydrolases, to be specific, those acting on phosphoric monoester bonds. The systematic name is 2-carboxy-D-arabinitol-1-phosphate 1-phosphohydrolase.

== In biology ==
The best-studied 2-Carboxy-D-arabinitol-1-phosphate phosphatase is the enzyme that inactivates the RuBisCO inhibitor 2-carboxy-D-arabinitol-1-phosphate (CA1P).

When light levels are high, the inactivation occurs after CA1P has been released from RuBisCO by RuBisCO activase. As CA1P is present in many but not all plants, CA1P-mediated regulation of RuBisCO is not universal for all photosynthetic life. Amino acid sequences of the CA1Pase enzymes from wheat, French bean, tobacco, and Arabidopsis thaliana reveal that the enzymes contain 2 different domains, indicating that it is a multifunctional enzyme.

CA1Pase enzyme activity varies between different species due to their regulation by different redox-active compounds, such as glutathione. However, it is yet to be determined whether this process occurs in vivo. Wheat CA1Pase heterologously expressed in E. coli is also able to dephosphorylate the RuBisCO inhibitor D-glycero-2,3-diulose-1,5-bisphosphate.
