= Glycolate dehydrogenase =

glycolate dehydrogenase

Identifiers
- EC no.: 1.1.99.14
- CAS no.: 37368-32-4

Databases
- IntEnz: IntEnz view
- BRENDA: BRENDA entry
- ExPASy: NiceZyme view
- KEGG: KEGG entry
- MetaCyc: metabolic pathway
- PRIAM: profile
- PDB structures: RCSB PDB PDBe PDBsum
- Gene Ontology: AmiGO / QuickGO
Search
- PMC: articles
- PubMed: articles
- NCBI: proteins

In enzymology, glycolate dehydrogenase (EC 1.1.99.14) is an enzyme that catalyzes the chemical reaction

glycolic acid
+ electron
acceptor
glyoxylic acid
+ reduced
acceptor

The two substrates of this enzyme are glycolic acid and an electron acceptor. Its products are glyoxylic acid and the corresponding reduced acceptor.

This enzyme belongs to the family of oxidoreductases, specifically those acting on the CH-OH group of donor with other acceptors. The systematic name of this enzyme class is glycolate:acceptor 2-oxidoreductase. Other names in common use include glycolate oxidoreductase, glycolic acid dehydrogenase, and glycolate:(acceptor) 2-oxidoreductase. This enzyme participates in glyoxylate and dicarboxylate metabolism.
