= Photorespiration =

Process in plant metabolism

Simplified photorespiration cycle

Simplified photorespiration and Calvin cycle

Photorespiration (also known as the oxidative photosynthetic carbon cycle or C_{2} cycle) refers to a process in plant metabolism where the enzyme RuBisCO oxygenates ribulose 1,5-bisphosphate (RuBP), wasting some of the energy produced by photosynthesis. The desired reaction is the addition of carbon dioxide to RuBP (carboxylation), a key step in the Calvin–Benson cycle, but approximately 25% of reactions by RuBisCO instead add oxygen to RuBP (oxygenation), creating a product that cannot be used within the Calvin–Benson cycle. This process lowers the efficiency of photosynthesis, potentially lowering photosynthetic output by 25% in C_{3} plants. Photorespiration involves a complex network of enzyme reactions that exchange metabolites between chloroplasts, leaf peroxisomes and mitochondria.

The oxygenation reaction of RuBisCO is a wasteful process because 3-phosphoglycerate is created at a lower rate and higher metabolic cost compared with RuBP carboxylase activity. While photorespiratory carbon cycling results in the formation of G3P eventually, around 25% of carbon fixed by photorespiration is re-released as CO_{2} and nitrogen, as ammonia. Ammonia must then be detoxified at a substantial cost to the cell. Photorespiration also incurs a direct cost of one ATP and one NAD(P)H.

While it is common to refer to the entire process as photorespiration, technically the term refers only to the metabolic network which acts to rescue the products of the oxygenation reaction (phosphoglycolate).

== Photorespiratory reactions ==
PhotorespirationFrom left to right: chloroplast, peroxisome, and mitochondrion

Addition of molecular oxygen to ribulose-1,5-bisphosphate produces 3-phosphoglycerate (PGA) and 2-phosphoglycolate (2PG, or PG). PGA is the normal product of carboxylation, and productively enters the Calvin cycle. Phosphoglycolate, however, inhibits certain enzymes involved in photosynthetic carbon fixation (hence is often said to be an 'inhibitor of photosynthesis'). It is also relatively difficult to recycle: in higher plants it is salvaged by a series of reactions in the peroxisome, mitochondria, and again in the peroxisome where it is converted into glycerate. Glycerate reenters the chloroplast and by the same transporter that exports glycolate. A cost of 1 ATP is associated with conversion to 3-phosphoglycerate (PGA) (Phosphorylation), within the chloroplast, which is then free to re-enter the Calvin cycle.

Several costs are associated with this metabolic pathway; the production of hydrogen peroxide in the peroxisome (associated with the conversion of glycolate to glyoxylate). Hydrogen peroxide is a dangerously strong oxidant which must be immediately split into water and oxygen by the enzyme catalase. The conversion of 2× 2Carbon glycine to 1× C_{3} serine in the mitochondria by the enzyme glycine-decarboxylase is a key step, which releases CO_{2}, NH_{3}, and reduces NAD to NADH. Thus, one CO_{2} molecule is produced for every two molecules of O_{2} (two deriving from RuBisCO and one from peroxisomal oxidations). The assimilation of NH_{3} occurs via the GS-GOGAT cycle, at a cost of one ATP and one NADPH.

Cyanobacteria have three possible pathways through which they can metabolise 2-phosphoglycolate. They are unable to grow if all three pathways are knocked out, despite having a carbon concentrating mechanism that should dramatically lower the rate of photorespiration (see below).

== Substrate specificity of RuBisCO ==
Oxygenase activity of RuBisCO

The oxidative photosynthetic carbon cycle reaction is catalyzed by RuBP oxygenase activity:

RuBP + O_{2} → Phosphoglycolate + 3-phosphoglycerate + 2 H^{+}

During the catalysis by RuBisCO, an 'activated' intermediate is formed (an enediol intermediate) in the RuBisCO active site. This intermediate is able to react with either CO_{2} or O_{2}. It has been demonstrated that the specific shape of the RuBisCO active site acts to encourage reactions with CO_{2}. Although there is a significant "failure" rate (~25% of reactions are oxygenation rather than carboxylation), this represents significant favouring of CO_{2}, when the relative abundance of the two gases is taken into account: in the current atmosphere, O_{2} is approximately 500 times more abundant, and in solution O_{2} is 25 times more abundant than CO_{2}.

The ability of RuBisCO to specify between the two gases is known as its selectivity factor (or Srel), and it varies between species, with angiosperms more efficient than other plants, but with little variation among the vascular plants.

A suggested explanation of RuBisCO's inability to discriminate completely between CO_{2} and O_{2} is that it is an evolutionary relic: The early atmosphere in which primitive plants originated contained very little oxygen, the early evolution of RuBisCO was not influenced by its ability to discriminate between O_{2} and CO_{2}.

== Conditions which affect photorespiration ==
Photorespiration rates are affected by:

=== Altered substrate availability: lowered CO_{2} or increased O_{2} ===
Factors which influence this include the atmospheric abundance of the two gases, the supply of the gases to the site of fixation (i.e. in land plants: whether the stomata are open or closed), the length of the liquid phase (how far these gases have to diffuse through water in order to reach the reaction site). For example, when the stomata are closed to prevent water loss during drought: this limits the CO_{2} supply, while O_{2} production within the leaf will continue. In algae (and plants which photosynthesise underwater) gases have to diffuse significant distances through water, which results in a decrease in the availability of CO_{2} relative to O_{2}. It has been predicted that the increase in ambient CO_{2} concentrations predicted over the next 100 years may lower the rate of photorespiration in most plants by around 50%. However, at temperatures higher than the photosynthetic thermal optimum, the increases in turnover rate are not translated into increased CO_{2} assimilation because of the decreased affinity of Rubisco for CO_{2}.

=== Increased temperature ===
At higher temperatures RuBisCO is less able to discriminate between CO_{2} and O_{2}. This is because the enediol intermediate is less stable. Increasing temperatures also lower the solubility of CO_{2}, thus lowering the concentration of CO_{2} relative to O_{2} in the chloroplast.

== Biological adaptation to minimize photorespiration ==
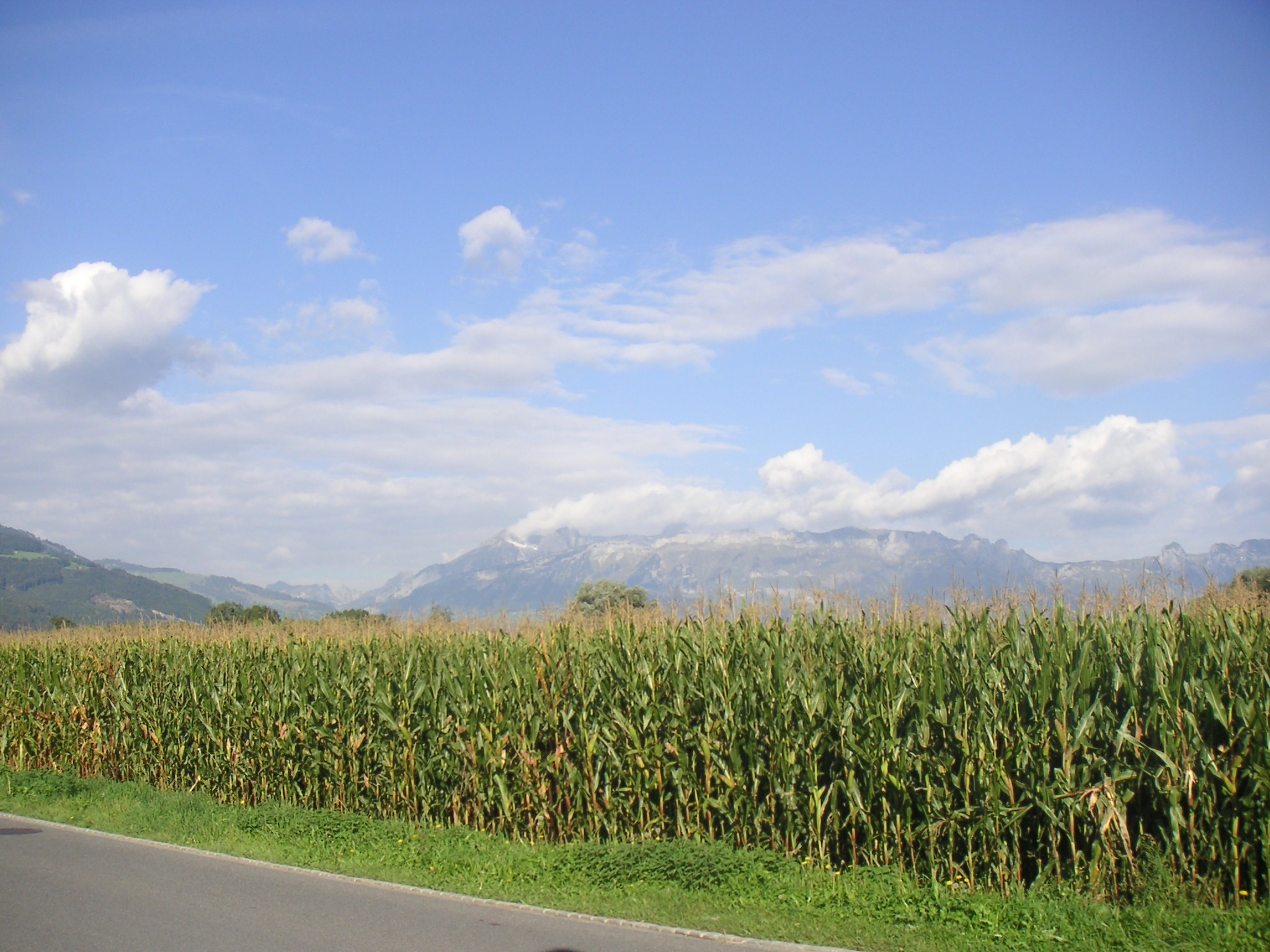
Maize uses the C_{4} pathway, minimizing photorespiration

The vast majority of plants are C3, meaning they photorespire when necessary. Certain species of plants or algae have mechanisms to lower the uptake of molecular oxygen by RuBisCO. These are commonly referred to as Carbon Concentrating Mechanisms (CCMs), as they increase the concentration of CO_{2} so that RuBisCO is less likely to produce glycolate through reaction with O_{2}.

=== Biochemical carbon concentrating mechanisms ===
Biochemical CCMs concentrate carbon dioxide in one temporal or spatial region, through metabolite exchange. C_{4} and CAM photosynthesis both use the enzyme Phosphoenolpyruvate carboxylase (PEPC) to add CO_{2} to a 4-carbon sugar. PEPC is faster than RuBisCO, and more selective for CO_{2}.

==== C_{4} ====
C_{4} plants capture carbon dioxide in their mesophyll cells (using an enzyme called phosphoenolpyruvate carboxylase which catalyzes the combination of carbon dioxide with a compound called phosphoenolpyruvate (PEP)), forming oxaloacetate. This oxaloacetate is then converted to malate and is transported into the bundle sheath cells (site of carbon dioxide fixation by RuBisCO) where oxygen concentration is low to avoid photorespiration. Here, carbon dioxide is removed from the malate and combined with RuBP by RuBisCO in the usual way, and the Calvin cycle proceeds as normal. The CO_{2} concentrations in the Bundle Sheath are approximately 10–20 fold higher than the concentration in the mesophyll cells.

This ability to avoid photorespiration makes these plants more hardy than other plants in dry and hot environments, wherein stomata are closed and internal carbon dioxide levels are low. Under these conditions, photorespiration does occur in C_{4} plants, but at a much lower level compared with C_{3} plants in the same conditions. C_{4} plants include sugar cane, corn (maize), and sorghum.

==== CAM (Crassulacean acid metabolism) ====
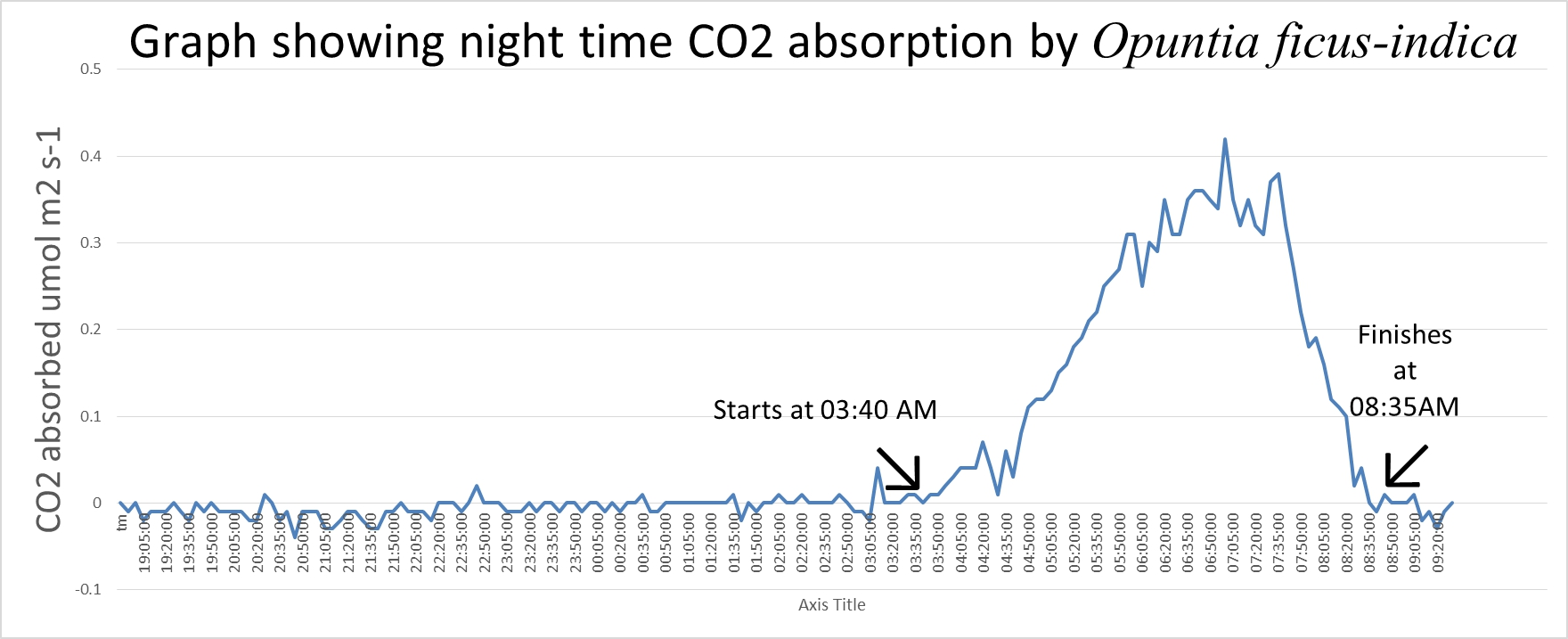
Overnight graph of CO_{2} absorbed by a CAM plant

CAM plants, such as cacti and succulent plants, also use the enzyme PEP carboxylase to capture carbon dioxide, but only at night. Crassulacean acid metabolism allows plants to conduct most of their gas exchange in the cooler night-time air, sequestering carbon in 4-carbon sugars which can be released to the photosynthesizing cells during the day. This allows CAM plants to minimize water loss (transpiration) by maintaining closed stomata during the day. CAM plants usually display other water-saving characteristics, such as thick cuticles, stomata with small apertures, and typically lose around 1/3 of the amount of water per CO_{2} fixed.

==== C_{2} ====
In C_{2} plants, the mitochondria of mesophyll cells have no glycine decarboxylase (GDC).

C_{2} photosynthesis (also called glycine shuttle and photorespiratory CO_{2} pump) is a CCM that works by making use of – as opposed to avoiding – photorespiration. It performs carbon refixation by delaying the breakdown of photorespired glycine, so that the molecule is shuttled from the mesophyll into the bundle sheath. Once there, the glycine is decarboxylated in mitochondria as usual, releasing CO_{2} and concentrating it to triple the usual concentration.

Although C_{2} photosynthesis is traditionally understood as an intermediate step between C_{3} and C_{4}, a wide variety of plant lineages do end up in the C_{2} stage without further evolving, showing that it is an evolutionary steady state of its own. C_{2} may be easier to engineer into crops, as the phenotype requires fewer anatomical changes to produce.

==== Algae ====
There have been some reports of algae operating a biochemical CCM: shuttling metabolites within single cells to concentrate CO_{2} in one area. This process is not fully understood.

=== Biophysical carbon dioxide-concentrating mechanisms ===
This type of carbon dioxide-concentrating mechanism (CCM) relies on a contained compartment within the cell into which CO_{2} is shuttled, and where RuBisCO is highly expressed. In many species, biophysical CCMs are only induced under low carbon dioxide concentrations. Biophysical CCMs are more evolutionary ancient than biochemical CCMs. There is some debate as to when biophysical CCMs first evolved, but it is likely to have been during a period of low carbon dioxide, after the Great Oxygenation Event (2.4 billion years ago). Low CO_{2} periods occurred around 750, 650, and 320–270 million years ago.

==== Eukaryotic algae ====
In nearly all species of eukaryotic algae (Chloromonas being one notable exception), upon induction of the CCM, ~95% of RuBisCO is densely packed into a single subcellular compartment: the pyrenoid. Carbon dioxide is concentrated in this compartment using a combination of CO_{2} pumps, bicarbonate pumps, and carbonic anhydrases. The pyrenoid is not a membrane-bound compartment but is found within the chloroplast, often surrounded by a starch sheath (which is not thought to serve a function in the CCM).

==== Hornworts ====
Certain species of hornwort are the only land plants that are known to have a biophysical CCM involving concentration of carbon dioxide within pyrenoids in their chloroplasts.

==== Cyanobacteria ====
Cyanobacterial CCMs are similar in principle to those found in eukaryotic algae and hornworts, but the compartment into which carbon dioxide is concentrated has several structural differences. Instead of the pyrenoid, cyanobacteria contain carboxysomes, which have a protein shell, and linker proteins packing RuBisCO inside with a very regular structure. Cyanobacterial CCMs are much better understood than those found in eukaryotes, partly due to the ease of genetic manipulation of prokaryotes.

== Possible purpose of photorespiration ==
Lowering photorespiration may not result in increased growth rates for plants. Photorespiration may be necessary for the assimilation of nitrate from soil. Thus, a lowering in photorespiration by genetic engineering or because of increasing atmospheric carbon dioxide may not benefit plants as has been proposed. Several physiological processes may be responsible for linking photorespiration and nitrogen assimilation. Photorespiration increases availability of NADH, which is required for the conversion of nitrate to nitrite. Certain nitrite transporters also transport bicarbonate, and elevated CO_{2} has been shown to suppress nitrite transport into chloroplasts. However, in an agricultural setting, replacing the native photorespiration pathway with an engineered synthetic pathway to metabolize glycolate in the chloroplast resulted in a 40 percent increase in crop growth.

Although photorespiration is much lower in C_{4} species, it is still an essential pathway – mutants without functioning 2-phosphoglycolate metabolism cannot grow in normal conditions. One mutant was shown to rapidly accumulate glycolate.

Although the functions of photorespiration remain controversial, it is widely accepted that this pathway influences a wide range of processes from bioenergetics, photosystem II function, and carbon metabolism to nitrogen assimilation and respiration. The oxygenase reaction of RuBisCO may prevent CO_{2} depletion near its active sites and contributes to the regulation of CO_{2} concentration in the atmosphere The photorespiratory pathway is a major source of hydrogen peroxide (H_{2}O_{2}) in photosynthetic cells. Through H_{2}O_{2} production and pyrimidine nucleotide interactions, photorespiration makes a key contribution to cellular redox homeostasis. In so doing, it influences multiple signalling pathways, in particular, those that govern plant hormonal responses controlling growth, environmental and defense responses, and programmed cell death.

It has been postulated that photorespiration may function as a "safety valve", preventing the excess of reductive potential coming from an overreduced NADPH-pool from reacting with oxygen and producing free radicals (oxidants), as these can damage the metabolic functions of the cell by subsequent oxidation of membrane lipids, proteins or nucleotides. The mutants deficient in photorespiratory enzymes are characterized by a high redox level in the cell, impaired stomatal regulation, and accumulation of formate.

== See also ==
- C_{3} photosynthesis
- C_{4} photosynthesis
- CAM photosynthesis
