= Ribulose 1,5-bisphosphate =

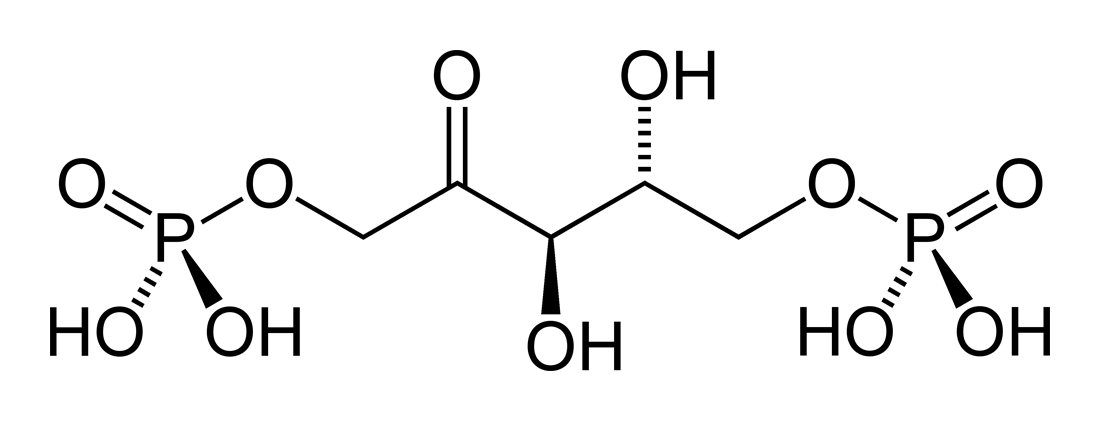
- Skeletal formula of RuBP The acid form of the RuBP anion

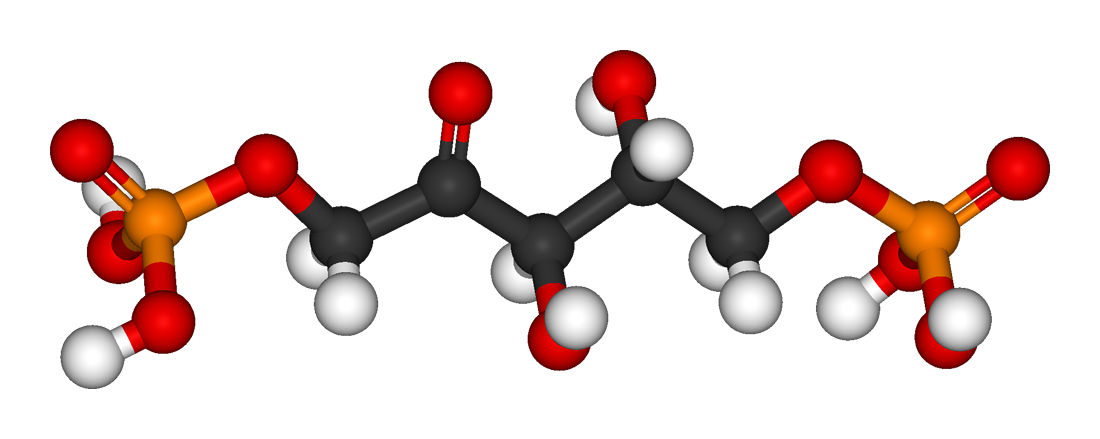
- Ball-and-stick model, based on x-ray diffraction data

Names
- IUPAC name 1,5-Di-O-phosphono-D-ribulose
- Other names Ribulose 1,5-diphosphate

Identifiers
CAS Number	2002-28-0
3D model (JSmol)	Interactive image
ChEBI	CHEBI:16710
ChemSpider	110238
KEGG	C01182
PubChem CID	123658
UNII	BR374X7NAH
CompTox Dashboard (EPA)	DTXSID301344111 DTXSID30173837, DTXSID301344111
- InChI: InChI=1S/C5H12O11P2/c6-3(1-15-17(9,10)11)5(8)4(7)2-16-18(12,13)14/h3,5-6,8H,1-2H2,(H2,9,10,11)(H2,12,13,14)/t3-,5-/m1/s1 Key: YAHZABJORDUQGO-NQXXGFSBSA-N
- SMILES: O=P(O)(OCC(=O)[C@H](O)[C@H](O)COP(=O)(O)O)O

Properties
Chemical formula	C_{5}H_{12}O_{11}P_{2}
Molar mass	310.088 g·mol^{−1}
- Except where otherwise noted, data are given for materials in their standard state (at 25 °C [77 °F], 100 kPa). verify (what is ?) Infobox references

Ribulose 1,5-bisphosphate (RuBP) is an organic substance that is involved in photosynthesis, notably as the principal CO_{2} acceptor in plants. It is a colourless anion, a double phosphate ester of the ketopentose (ketone-containing sugar with five carbon atoms) called ribulose. Salts of RuBP can be isolated, but its crucial biological function happens in solution. RuBP occurs not only in plants but in all domains of life, including Archaea, Bacteria, and Eukarya.

== History ==
RuBP was originally discovered by Andrew Benson in 1951 while working in the lab of Melvin Calvin at UC Berkeley. Calvin, who had been away from the lab at the time of discovery and was not listed as a co-author, controversially removed the full molecule name from the title of the initial paper, identifying it solely as "ribulose". At the time, the molecule was known as ribulose diphosphate (RDP or RuDP) but the prefix di- was changed to bis- to emphasize the nonadjacency of the two phosphate groups.

== Role in photosynthesis and the Calvin-Benson Cycle ==
The enzyme ribulose-1,5-bisphosphate carboxylase-oxygenase (rubisco) catalyzes the reaction between RuBP and carbon dioxide. The product is the highly unstable six-carbon intermediate known as 3-keto-2-carboxyarabinitol 1,5-bisphosphate, or 2'-carboxy-3-keto-D-arabinitol 1,5-bisphosphate (CKABP). This six-carbon β-ketoacid intermediate hydrates into another six-carbon intermediate in the form of a gem-diol. This intermediate then cleaves into two molecules of 3-phosphoglycerate (3-PGA) which is used in a number of metabolic pathways and is converted into glucose.

In the Calvin-Benson cycle, RuBP is a product of the phosphorylation of ribulose-5-phosphate (produced by glyceraldehyde 3-phosphate) by ATP.

The Calvin-Benson cycle showing the role of ribulose-1,5-bisphosphate.

=== Interactions with rubisco ===
RuBP acts as an enzyme inhibitor for the enzyme rubisco, which regulates the net activity of carbon fixation. When RuBP is bound to an active site of rubisco, the ability to activate via carbamylation with CO_{2} and Mg^{2+} is blocked. The functionality of rubisco activase involves removing RuBP and other inhibitory bonded molecules to re-enable carbamylation on the active site.

== Role in photorespiration ==
Rubisco also catalyzes RuBP with oxygen (O_{2}) in an interaction called photorespiration, a process that is more prevalent at high temperatures. During photorespiration RuBP combines with O_{2} to become 3-PGA and phosphoglycolic acid. Like the Calvin-Benson Cycle, the photorespiratory pathway has been noted for its enzymatic inefficiency although this characterization of the enzymatic kinetics of rubisco has been contested. Due to enhanced RuBP carboxylation and decreased rubisco oxygenation stemming from the increased concentration of CO_{2} in the bundle sheath, rates of photorespiration are decreased in C_{4} plants. Similarly, photorespiration is limited in CAM photosynthesis due to kinetic delays in enzyme activation, again stemming from the ratio of carbon dioxide to oxygen.

== Measurement ==
RuBP can be measured isotopically via the conversion of ^{14}CO_{2} and RuBP into glyceraldehyde 3-phosphate. G3P can then be measured using an enzymatic optical assay. (Note: Note that G3P is a 3-carbon sugar so its abundance should be twice that of the 6-carbon RuBP, after accounting for rates of enzymatic catalysis.) Given the abundance of RuBP in biological samples, an added difficulty is distinguishing particular reservoirs of the substrate, such as the RuBP internal to a chloroplast vs external. One approach to resolving this is by subtractive inference, or measuring the total RuBP of a system, removing a reservoir (e.g. by centrifugation), re-measuring the total RuBP, and using the difference to infer the concentration in the given repository.

== See also ==
- Rubisco
- Calvin-Benson cycle
- 3-Phosphoglyceric acid
- Photosynthesis
