= RuBisCO =

Key enzyme of photosynthesis involved in carbon fixation

Ribulose-1,5-bisphosphate carboxylase oxygenase
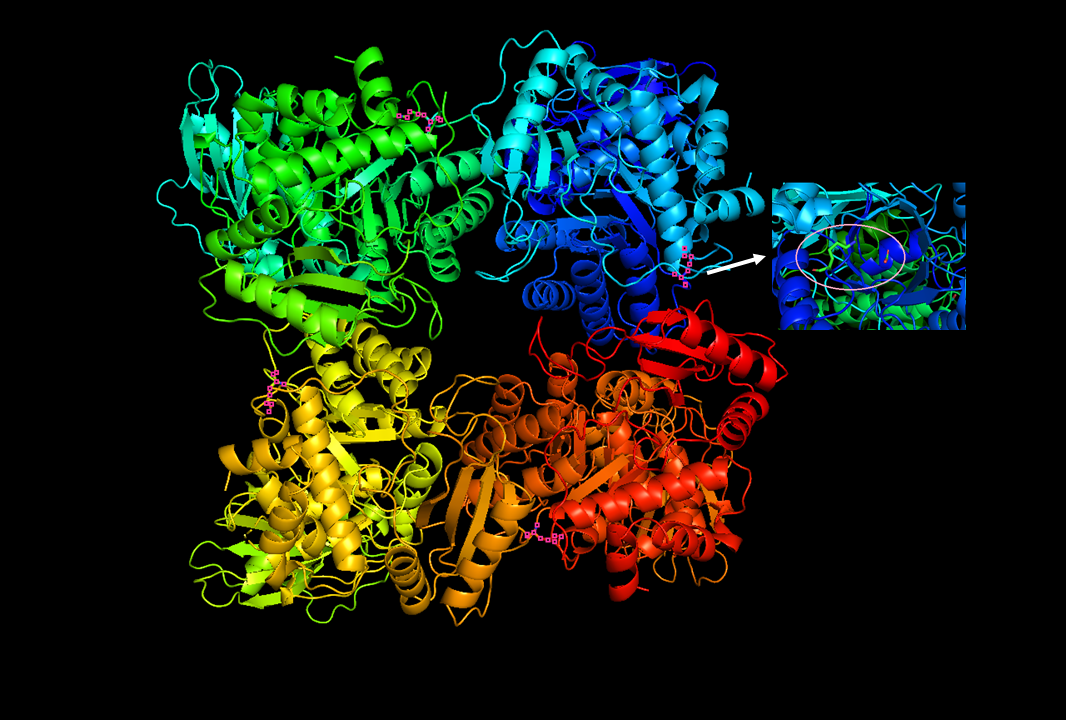
- A 3D depiction of the activated RuBisCO from spinach in open form with active site accessible. The active site Lys175 residues are marked in pink, and a close-up of the residue is provided to the right for one of the monomers composing the enzyme.

Identifiers
- EC no.: 4.1.1.39
- CAS no.: 9027-23-0

Databases
- BRENDA: enzyme data
- ExPASy: NiceZyme view
- KEGG: enzyme entry
- MetaCyc: metabolic pathway
- Rhea: reactions
- PDB structures: RCSB PDB PDBe PDBsum
- Gene Ontology: AmiGO / QuickGO
Search
- PMC: articles
- PubMed: articles
- NCBI: proteins

Ribulose-1,5-bisphosphate carboxylase/oxygenase, commonly known by the abbreviations RuBisCo, rubisco, RuBPCase, or RuBPco, is an enzyme (EC 4.1.1.39) involved in the light-independent (or "dark") part of photosynthesis, including the carbon fixation by which atmospheric carbon dioxide is converted by plants and other photosynthetic organisms to energy-rich molecules such as glucose. It emerged approximately four billion years ago in primordial metabolism prior to the presence of oxygen on Earth. It is the most abundant enzyme on Earth. In chemical terms, it catalyzes the carboxylation of ribulose-1,5-bisphosphate (also known as RuBP).

== Structure ==
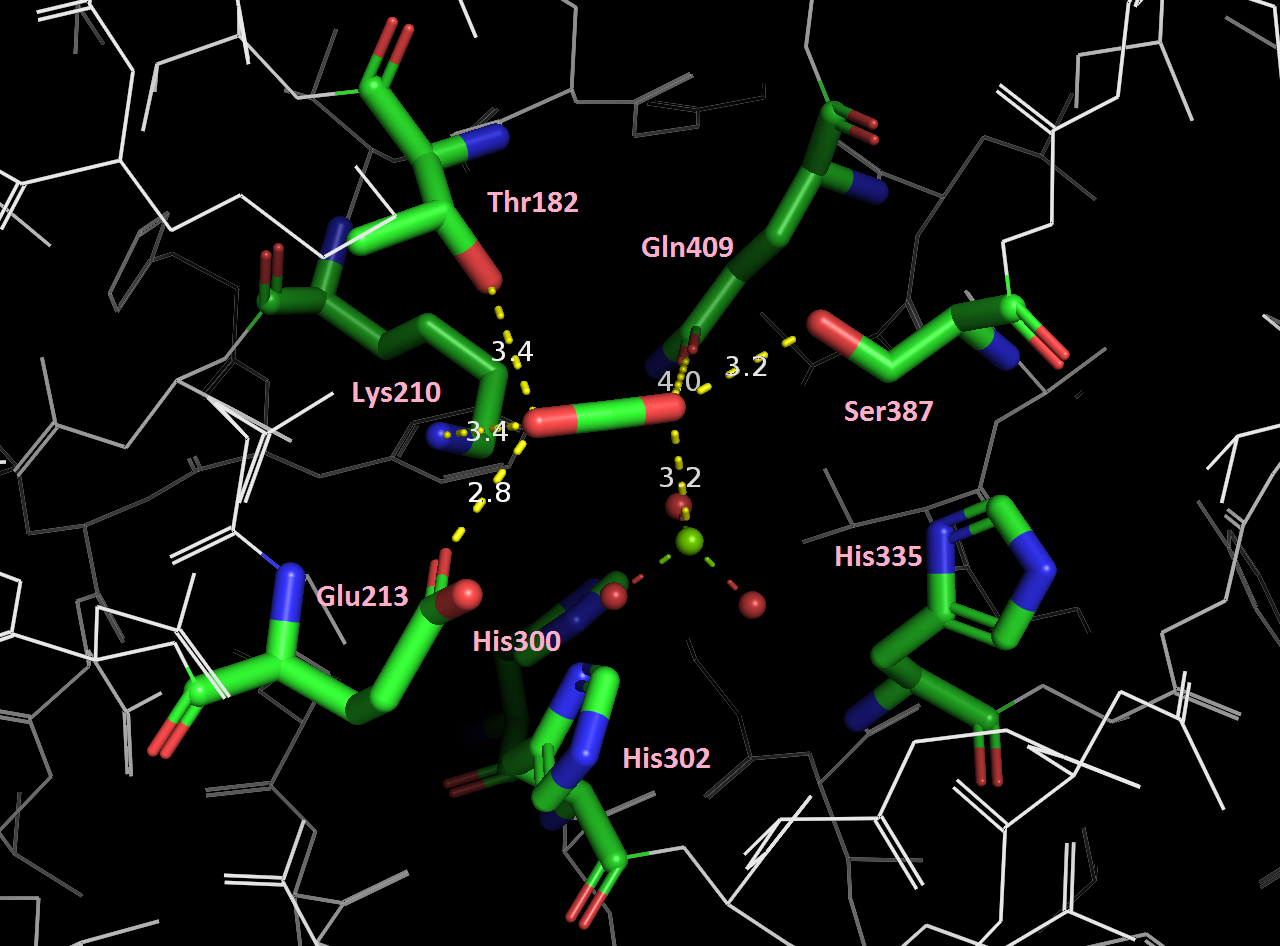
Active site of RuBisCO of Galdieria sulphuraria with CO_{2}: Residues involved in both the active site and stabilizing CO_{2} for enzyme catalysis are shown in color and labeled. Distances of the hydrogen bonding interactions are shown in angstroms. Mg^{2+} ion (green sphere) is shown coordinated to CO_{2}, and is followed by three water molecules (red spheres). All other residues are placed in grayscale.

Location of the rbcL gene in the chloroplast genome of Arabidopsis thaliana (positions ca. 55-56.4 kb). rbcL is one of the 21 protein-coding genes involved in photosynthesis (green boxes).

In plants, algae, cyanobacteria, and phototrophic and chemoautotrophic Pseudomonadota (formerly referred to as proteobacteria), the enzyme usually consists of two types of protein subunit, called the large chain (L, about 55,000 Da) and the small chain (S, about 13,000 Da). The large-chain gene (rbcL) is encoded by the chloroplast DNA in plants. There are typically several related small-chain genes in the nucleus of plant cells, and the small chains are imported to the stromal compartment of chloroplasts from the cytosol by crossing the outer chloroplast membrane. The enzymatically active substrate (ribulose 1,5-bisphosphate) binding sites are located in the large chains that form dimers in which amino acids from each large chain contribute to the binding sites. A total of eight large chains (= four dimers) and eight small chains assemble into a larger complex of about 540,000 Da. In some Pseudomonadota and dinoflagellates, enzymes consisting of only large subunits have been found. (Note: The structure of RuBisCO from the photosynthetic bacterium Rhodospirillum rubrum has been determined by X-ray crystallography, see: PDB: 9RUB. A comparison of the structures of eukaryotic and bacterial RuBisCO is shown in the Protein Data Bank "Molecule of the Month" #11.)

Magnesium ions (Mg^{2+}) are needed for enzymatic activity. Correct positioning of Mg^{2+} in the active site of the enzyme involves addition of an "activating" carbon dioxide molecule (CO_{2}) to a lysine in the active site (forming a carbamate). Mg^{2+} operates by driving deprotonation of the Lys210 residue, causing the Lys residue to rotate by 120 degrees to the trans conformer, decreasing the distance between the nitrogen of Lys and the carbon of CO_{2}. The close proximity allows for the formation of a covalent bond, resulting in the carbamate. Mg^{2+} is first enabled to bind to the active site by the rotation of His335 to an alternate conformation. Mg^{2+} is then coordinated by the His residues of the active site (His300, His302, His335), and is partially neutralized by the coordination of three water molecules and their conversion to ^{−}OH. This coordination results in an unstable complex, but produces a favorable environment for the binding of Mg^{2+}. Formation of the carbamate is favored by an alkaline pH. The pH and the concentration of magnesium ions in the fluid compartment (in plants, the stroma of the chloroplast) increases in the light. The role of changing pH and magnesium ion levels in the regulation of RuBisCO enzyme activity is discussed below. Once the carbamate is formed, His335 finalizes the activation by returning to its initial position through thermal fluctuation.

RuBisCO large chain, catalytic domain

Identifiers
- Symbol: RuBisCO_large
- Pfam: PF00016
- InterPro: IPR000685
- PROSITE: PDOC00142
- SCOP2: 3rub / SCOPe / SUPFAM
- CDD: cd08148
Available protein structures:
- PDB: 1aa1, 1aus, 1bwv, 1bxn, 1ej7, 1geh, 1gk8, 1ir1, 1ir2, 1iwa, 1rba, 1rbl, 1rbo, 1rco, 1rcx, 1rld, 1rsc, 1rus, 1rxo, 1svd, 1tel, 1upm, 1upp, 1uw9, 1uwa, 1uzd, 1uzh, 1wdd, 1ykw, 2cwx, 2cxe, 2d69, 2qyg, 2rus, 2v63, 2v67, 2v68, 2v69, 2v6a, 3rub, 4rub, 5rub, 8ruc, 9rub IPR000685 PF00016 (ECOD; PDBsum)
- AlphaFold: IPR000685; PF00016

RuBisCO, N-terminal domain

Identifiers
- Symbol: RuBisCO_large_N
- Pfam: PF02788
- InterPro: IPR017444
- SCOP2: 3rub / SCOPe / SUPFAM
Available protein structures:
- PDB: 1aa1, 1aus, 1bwv, 1bxn, 1ej7, 1geh, 1gk8, 1ir1, 1ir2, 1iwa, 1rba, 1rbl, 1rbo, 1rco, 1rcx, 1rld, 1rsc, 1rus, 1rxo, 1svd, 1tel, 1upm, 1upp, 1uw9, 1uwa, 1uzd, 1uzh, 1wdd, 1ykw, 2cwx, 2cxe, 2d69, 2qyg, 2rus, 2v63, 2v67, 2v68, 2v69, 2v6a, 3rub, 4rub, 5rub, 8ruc, 9rub IPR017444 PF02788 (ECOD; PDBsum)
- AlphaFold: IPR017444; PF02788

RuBisCO, small chain

Identifiers
- Symbol: RuBisCO_small
- Pfam: PF00101
- InterPro: IPR000894
- SCOP2: 3rub / SCOPe / SUPFAM
- CDD: cd03527
Available protein structures:
- PDB: 1aa1, 1aus, 1bwv, 1bxn, 1ej7, 1gk8, 1ir1, 1ir2, 1iwa, 1rbl, 1rbo, 1rco, 1rcx, 1rlc, 1rld, 1rsc, 1rxo, 1svd, 1upm, 1upp, 1uw9, 1uwa, 1uzd, 1uzh, 1wdd, 2v63, 2v67, 2v68, 2v69, 2v6a, 3rub, 4rub, 8ruc IPR000894 PF00101 (ECOD; PDBsum)
- AlphaFold: IPR000894; PF00101

== Function ==
RuBisCO catalyzes carbon fixation in the Calvin cycle, a major route by which inorganic carbon enters the biosphere. Some autotrophic bacteria and archaea fix carbon through other pathways, such as the reductive acetyl-CoA pathway, the 3-hydroxypropionate cycle, and the reverse Krebs cycle. These pathways contribute less to global carbon fixation than RuBisCO-dependent carbon fixation.

RuBisCO is the most abundant protein in leaves. It accounts for about 50% of soluble leaf protein in C_{3} plants (20–30% of total leaf nitrogen) and about 30% in C_{4} plants (5–9% of total leaf nitrogen).

=== Reactions ===
RuBisCO catalyses two competing reactions with ribulose-1,5-bisphosphate (RuBP): carboxylation with CO_{2} and oxygenation with molecular oxygen (O_{2}).

The two main reactions catalysed by RuBisCO: carboxylation and oxygenation of ribulose-1,5-bisphosphate.

In the carboxylation reaction, RuBP reacts with CO_{2} to produce two molecules of 3-phosphoglycerate, which enter the Calvin cycle. The CO_{2} used as a substrate is separate from the CO_{2} that activates the enzyme by forming a carbamate at the active site. In the oxygenation reaction, RuBP reacts with molecular oxygen (O_{2}) to produce one molecule each of 3-phosphoglycerate and 2-phosphoglycolate.

Photorespiration recovers part of the carbon in 2-phosphoglycolate. In this pathway, two molecules of 2-phosphoglycolate yield one molecule of 3-phosphoglycerate, which re-enters the Calvin cycle, and release one molecule of CO_{2}. Some plants, algae and photosynthetic bacteria concentrate CO_{2} around RuBisCO, reducing the frequency of oxygenation. These mechanisms include C_{4} carbon fixation, crassulacean acid metabolism and the use of pyrenoids.

=== Catalytic mechanism ===
RuBisCO carboxylation proceeds through RuBP binding and enolisation, followed by CO_{2} addition, hydration, C–C bond cleavage and protonation.

==== Binding RuBP ====
Coordination with Mg^{2+} stabilises the carbamate formed on the ε-amino group of Lys210. The carboxylate groups of Asp203 and Glu204 also coordinate the magnesium ion. When RuBP binds, it displaces two of the three water ligands coordinated to the ion.

==== Enolisation ====
Enolisation begins with deprotonation of RuBP at carbon 3 to form a 2,3-enediolate. The identity of the catalytic base has been debated. Crystal structures support a mechanism in which the carbamate oxygen of Lys210 that is free of magnesium coordination abstracts the proton.

==== Carboxylation ====
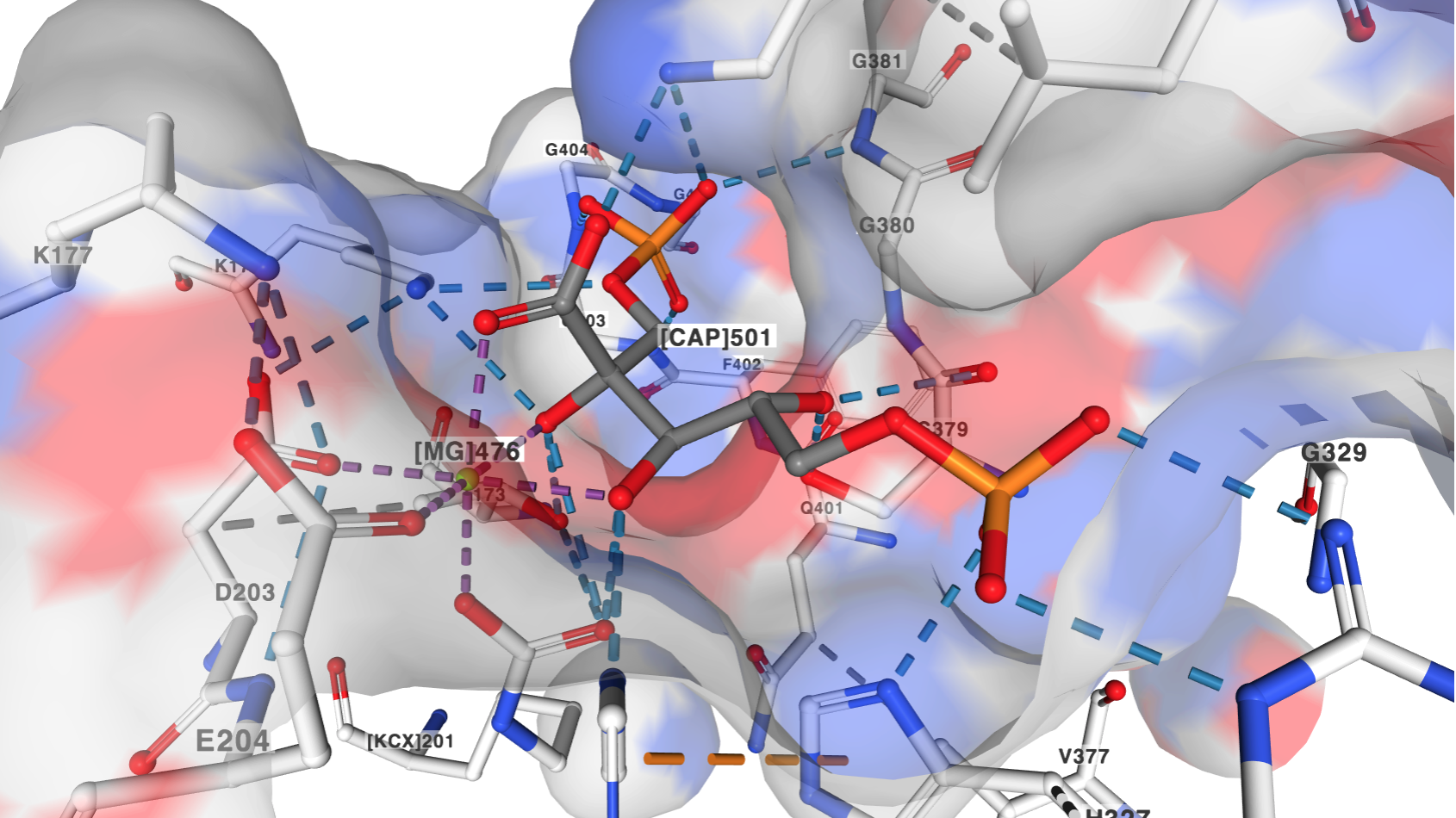
Active site of spinach RuBisCO complexed with 2-carboxyarabinitol-1,5-bisphosphate, CO_{2}, and Mg^{2+} (PDB: 1IR1, ligand CAP).

Addition of CO_{2} to the 2,3-enediolate forms the six-carbon intermediate 3-keto-2-carboxyarabinitol-1,5-bisphosphate. In the proposed mechanism, Lys334 facilitates CO_{2} addition as the substrate displaces the third water ligand coordinated to Mg^{2+}. Addition proceeds without formation of a distinct CO_{2}-bound Michaelis complex. Hydration adds a hydroxy group at carbon 3 to form a gem-diol intermediate. Carboxylation and hydration have been proposed to occur either in a single concerted step or in two sequential steps. The proximity of a water molecule to carbon 3 in several crystal structures supports the concerted mechanism.

==== C–C bond cleavage ====
Cleavage of the bond between carbons 2 and 3 of the gem-diol intermediate yields one molecule of 3-phosphoglycerate and a carbanion intermediate. Stereospecific protonation of the carbanion yields the second molecule of 3-phosphoglycerate. Lys175 or carbamylated Lys210 has been proposed to facilitate this step.

=== Kinetics and regulation ===
RuBisCO has a relatively low catalytic turnover, fixing about 3–10 molecules of CO_{2} per second. Its activity can limit carbon fixation in the Calvin cycle, and increasing the CO_{2} concentration can increase the carboxylation rate when light is sufficient.

One proposed explanation for RuBisCO's ability to discriminate between CO_{2} and O_{2} is that their quadrupole moments interact differently with the electrostatic field gradient at the active site. In this model, oppositely charged regions of the large-subunit dimer generate the gradient, and closure of the active site limits solvent exposure. The entropic cost of closure has been proposed to contribute to slow turnover. Substitutions in the C-terminal region of the large subunit have been shown to increase CO_{2}/O_{2} specificity in Chlamydomonas RuBisCO.

Side reactions can produce inhibitory compounds, including xylulose 1,5-bisphosphate and glycero-2,3-pentodiulose 1,5-bisphosphate. These compounds can inhibit RuBisCO by binding at the active site. RuBisCO activase helps release inhibitory sugar phosphates.

In plants, light supports the regeneration of RuBP and coordinates RuBisCO activity with that of other enzymes in the Calvin cycle.

==== By ions ====
Upon illumination of the chloroplasts, the pH of the stroma rises from 7.0 to 8.0 because of the proton (hydrogen ion, H^{+}) gradient created across the thylakoid membrane. The movement of protons into thylakoids is driven by light and is fundamental to ATP synthesis in chloroplasts (Further reading: Photosynthetic reaction centre; Light-dependent reactions). To balance ion potential across the membrane, magnesium ions (Mg^{2+}) move out of the thylakoids in response, increasing the concentration of magnesium in the stroma of the chloroplasts. RuBisCO has a high optimal pH (can be >9.0, depending on the magnesium ion concentration) and, thus, becomes "activated" by the introduction of carbon dioxide and magnesium to the active sites as described above.

==== By RuBisCO activase ====
In plants and some algae, another enzyme, RuBisCO activase (Rca, GO:0046863, P10896), is required to allow the rapid formation of the critical carbamate in the active site of RuBisCO. This is required because ribulose 1,5-bisphosphate (RuBP) binds more strongly to the active sites of RuBisCO when excess carbamate is present, preventing processes from moving forward. In the light, RuBisCO activase promotes the release of the inhibitory (or — in some views — storage) RuBP from the catalytic sites of RuBisCO. Activase is also required in some plants (e.g., tobacco and many beans) because, in darkness, RuBisCO is inhibited (or protected from hydrolysis) by a competitive inhibitor synthesized by these plants, a substrate analog 2-carboxy-D-arabitinol 1-phosphate (CA1P). CA1P binds tightly to the active site of carbamylated RuBisCO and inhibits catalytic activity to an even greater extent. CA1P has also been shown to keep RuBisCO in a conformation that is protected from proteolysis. In the light, RuBisCO activase also promotes the release of CA1P from the catalytic sites. After the CA1P is released from RuBisCO, it is rapidly converted to a non-inhibitory form by a light-activated CA1P-phosphatase. Even without these strong inhibitors, once every several hundred reactions, the normal reactions with carbon dioxide or oxygen are not completed; other inhibitory substrate analogs are still formed in the active site. Once again, RuBisCO activase can promote the release of these analogs from the catalytic sites and maintain the enzyme in a catalytically active form. However, at high temperatures, RuBisCO activase aggregates and can no longer activate RuBisCO. This contributes to the decreased carboxylating capacity observed during heat stress.

==== By activase ====
The removal of the inhibitory RuBP, CA1P, and the other inhibitory substrate analogs by activase requires the consumption of ATP. This reaction is inhibited by the presence of ADP, and, thus, activase activity depends on the ratio of these compounds in the chloroplast stroma. Furthermore, in most plants, the sensitivity of activase to the ratio of ATP/ADP is modified by the stromal reduction/oxidation (redox) state through another small regulatory protein, thioredoxin. In this manner, the activity of activase and the activation state of RuBisCO can be modulated in response to light intensity and, thus, the rate of formation of the ribulose 1,5-bisphosphate substrate.

==== By phosphate ====
In cyanobacteria, inorganic phosphate (P_{i}) also participates in the co-ordinated regulation of photosynthesis: P_{i} binds to the RuBisCO active site and to another site on the large chain where it can influence transitions between activated and less active conformations of the enzyme. In this way, activation of bacterial RuBisCO might be particularly sensitive to P_{i} levels, which might cause it to act in a similar way to how RuBisCO activase functions in higher plants.

==== By carbon dioxide ====
Since carbon dioxide and oxygen compete at the active site of RuBisCO, carbon fixation by RuBisCO can be enhanced by increasing the carbon dioxide level in the compartment containing RuBisCO (chloroplast stroma). Several times during the evolution of plants, mechanisms have evolved for increasing the level of carbon dioxide in the stroma (see C_{4} carbon fixation). The use of oxygen as a substrate appears to be a puzzling process, since it seems to throw away captured energy. However, it may be a mechanism for preventing carbohydrate overload during periods of high light flux. This weakness in the enzyme is the cause of photorespiration, such that healthy leaves in bright light may have zero net carbon fixation when the ratio of O_{2} to CO_{2} available to RuBisCO shifts too far towards oxygen. This phenomenon is primarily temperature-dependent: high temperatures can decrease the concentration of CO_{2} dissolved in the moisture of leaf tissues. This phenomenon is also related to water stress: since plant leaves are evaporatively cooled, limited water causes high leaf temperatures. C_{4} plants use the enzyme PEP carboxylase initially, which has a higher affinity for CO_{2}. The process first makes a 4-carbon intermediate compound, hence the name C_{4} plants, which is shuttled into a site of C_{3} photosynthesis then decarboxylated, releasing CO_{2} to boost the concentration of CO_{2}.

Crassulacean acid metabolism (CAM) plants keep their stomata closed during the day, which conserves water but prevents the light-independent reactions (a.k.a. the Calvin Cycle) from taking place, since these reactions require CO_{2} to pass by gas exchange through these openings. Evaporation through the upper side of a leaf is prevented by a layer of wax.

== Evolution ==
=== Phylogenetic studies ===
The chloroplast gene rbcL, which codes for the large subunit of RuBisCO has been widely used as an appropriate locus for analysis of phylogenetics in plant taxonomy.

=== Origin ===
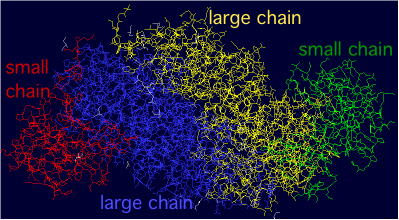
Figure 3. In this figure, each protein chain in the (LS)_{2} complex is given its own color for easy identification.

Non-carbon-fixing proteins similar to RuBisCO, termed RuBisCO-like proteins (RLPs), are also found in the wild in organisms as common as Bacillus subtilis. This bacterium has a rbcL-like protein with a 2,3-diketo-5-methylthiopentyl-1-phosphate enolase function, part of the methionine salvage pathway. Later identifications found functionally divergent examples dispersed all over bacteria and archaea, as well as transitionary enzymes performing both RLP-type enolase and RuBisCO functions. It is now believed that the current RuBisCO evolved from a dimeric RLP ancestor, acquiring its carboxylase function first before further oligomerizing and then recruiting the small subunit to form the familiar modern enzyme. The small subunit probably first evolved in anaerobic and thermophilic organisms, where it enabled RuBisCO to catalyze its reaction at higher temperatures. In addition to its effect on stabilizing catalysis, it enabled the evolution of higher specificities for CO_{2} over O_{2} by modulating the effect that substitutions within RuBisCO have on enzymatic function. Substitutions that do not have an effect without the small subunit suddenly become beneficial when it is bound. Furthermore, the small subunit enabled the accumulation of substitutions that are only tolerated in its presence. Accumulation of such substitutions leads to a strict dependence on the small subunit, which is observed in extant Rubiscos that bind a small subunit.

=== C_{4} ===
With the mass convergent evolution of the C_{4}-fixation pathway in a diversity of plant lineages, ancestral C_{3}-type RuBisCO evolved to have faster turnover of CO_{2} in exchange for lower specificity as a result of the greater localization of CO_{2} from the mesophyll cells into the bundle sheath cells. This was achieved through enhancement of conformational flexibility of the "open-closed" transition in the Calvin cycle. Laboratory-based phylogenetic studies have shown that this evolution was constrained by the trade-off between stability and activity brought about by the series of necessary mutations for C_{4} RuBisCO. Moreover, in order to sustain the destabilizing mutations, the evolution to C_{4} RuBisCO was preceded by a period in which mutations granted the enzyme increased stability, establishing a buffer to sustain and maintain the mutations required for C_{4} RuBisCO. To assist with this buffering process, the newly-evolved enzyme was found to have further developed a series of stabilizing mutations. While RuBisCO has always been accumulating new mutations, most of these mutations that have survived have not had significant effects on protein stability. The destabilizing C_{4} mutations on RuBisCO has been sustained by environmental pressures such as low CO_{2} concentrations, requiring a sacrifice of stability for new adaptive functions.

== Genetic engineering ==
Since RuBisCO is often rate-limiting for photosynthesis in plants, it may be possible to improve photosynthetic efficiency by modifying RuBisCO genes in plants to increase catalytic activity and/or decrease oxygenation rates. This could improve sequestration of CO_{2} and be a strategy to increase crop yields. Approaches under investigation include transferring RuBisCO genes from one organism into another organism, engineering Rubisco activase from thermophilic cyanobacteria into temperature sensitive plants, increasing the level of expression of RuBisCO subunits, expressing RuBisCO small chains from the chloroplast DNA, and altering RuBisCO genes to increase specificity for carbon dioxide or otherwise increase the rate of carbon fixation.

=== Mutagenesis in plants ===
In general, site-directed mutagenesis of RuBisCO has been mostly unsuccessful, though mutated forms of the protein have been achieved in tobacco plants with subunit C_{4} species, and a RuBisCO with more C_{4}-like kinetic characteristics have been attained in rice via nuclear transformation. Robust and reliable engineering for yield of RuBisCO and other enzymes in the C_{3} cycle was shown to be possible, and it was first achieved in 2019 through a synthetic biology approach.

One avenue is to introduce RuBisCO variants with naturally high specificity values such as the ones from the red alga Galdieria partita into plants. This may improve the photosynthetic efficiency of crop plants, although possible negative impacts have yet to be studied. Advances in this area include the replacement of the tobacco enzyme with that of the purple photosynthetic bacterium Rhodospirillum rubrum. In 2014, two transplastomic tobacco lines with functional RuBisCO from the cyanobacterium Synechococcus elongatus PCC7942 (Se7942) were created by replacing the RuBisCO with the large and small subunit genes of the Se7942 enzyme, in combination with either the corresponding Se7942 assembly chaperone, RbcX, or an internal carboxysomal protein, CcmM35. Both mutants had increased CO_{2} fixation rates when measured as carbon molecules per RuBisCO. However, the mutant plants grew more slowly than wild-type.

A recent theory explores the trade-off between the relative specificity (i.e., ability to favour CO_{2} fixation over O_{2} incorporation, which leads to the energy-wasteful process of photorespiration) and the rate at which product is formed. The authors conclude that RuBisCO may actually have evolved to reach a point of 'near-perfection' in many plants (with widely varying substrate availabilities and environmental conditions), reaching a compromise between specificity and reaction rate. It has been also suggested that the oxygenase reaction of RuBisCO prevents CO_{2} depletion near its active sites and provides the maintenance of the chloroplast redox state.

Since photosynthesis is the single most effective natural regulator of carbon dioxide in the Earth's atmosphere, a biochemical model of RuBisCO reaction is used as the core module of climate change models. Thus, a correct model of this reaction is essential to the basic understanding of the relations and interactions of environmental models.

=== Expression in bacterial hosts ===
There currently are very few effective methods for expressing functional plant Rubisco in bacterial hosts for genetic manipulation studies. This is largely due to Rubisco's requirement of complex cellular machinery for its biogenesis and metabolic maintenance including the nuclear-encoded RbcS subunits, which are typically imported into chloroplasts as unfolded proteins. Furthermore, sufficient expression and interaction with Rubisco activase are major challenges as well. One successful method for expression of Rubisco in E. coli involves the co-expression of multiple chloroplast chaperones, though this has only been shown for Arabidopsis thaliana Rubisco.

== Depletion in proteomic studies ==
Due to its high abundance in plants (generally 40% of the total protein content), RuBisCO often impedes analysis of important signaling proteins such as transcription factors, kinases, and regulatory proteins found in lower abundance (10-100 molecules per cell) within plants. For example, using mass spectrometry on plant protein mixtures would result in multiple intense RuBisCO subunit peaks that interfere and hide those of other proteins.

Recently, one efficient method for precipitating out RuBisCO involves the usage of protamine sulfate solution. Other existing methods for depleting RuBisCO and studying lower abundance proteins include fractionation techniques with calcium and phytate, gel electrophoresis with polyethylene glycol, affinity chromatography, and aggregation using DTT, though these methods are more time-consuming and less efficient when compared to protamine sulfate precipitation.

== History of the term ==
The term "RuBisCO" was coined humorously in 1979, by David Eisenberg at a seminar honouring the retirement of the early, prominent RuBisCO researcher, Sam Wildman, and also alluded to the snack food trade name "Nabisco" in reference to Wildman's attempts to create an edible protein supplement from tobacco leaves.

The capitalization of the name has been long debated. It can be capitalized for each letter of the full name (Ribulose-1,5 bisphosphate carboxylase/oxygenase), but it has also been argued that is should all be in lower case (rubisco), similar to other terms like scuba or laser.

== See also ==
- Carbon cycle
- Photorespiration
- Pyrenoid
- C3 carbon fixation
- C4 carbon fixation
- Crassulacean acid metabolism/CAM photosynthesis
- Carboxysome
