= Vascular bundle =

Transport system component in vascular plants

Types of Vascular bundles (blue: Xylem, green: Phloem, white: Cambium) A concentric, periphloematic(Hadrocentric) B concentric, perixylematic(Leptocentric) C radial with inner xylem, here with four xylem-poles, left closed, right open D collateral closed E collateral open F bicollateral open

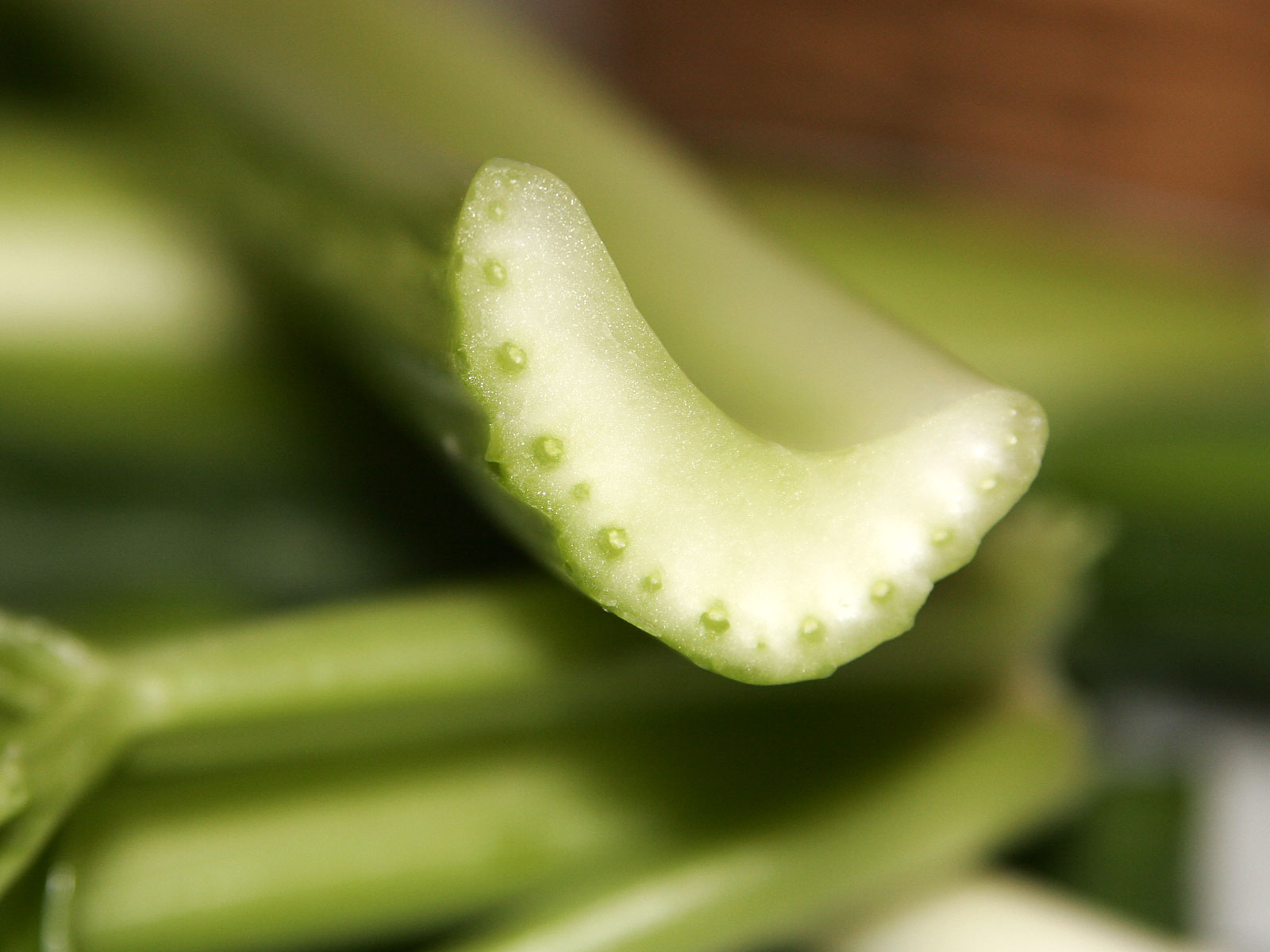
Cross section of celery stalk, showing vascular bundles, which includes both phloem and xylem

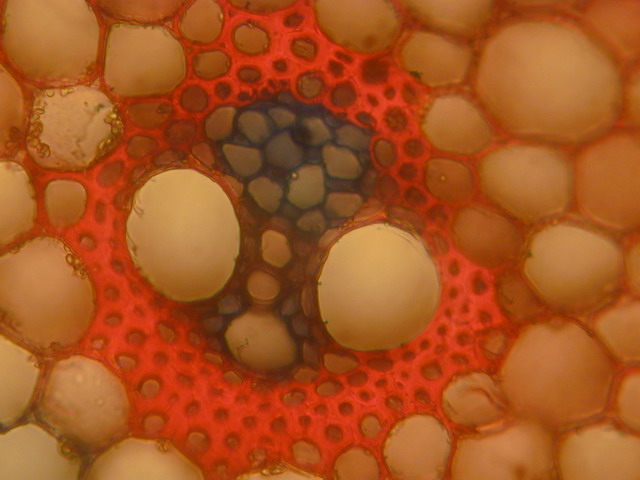
Detail of vascular bundle: closed, collateral vascular bundles of the stem axis of Zea mays

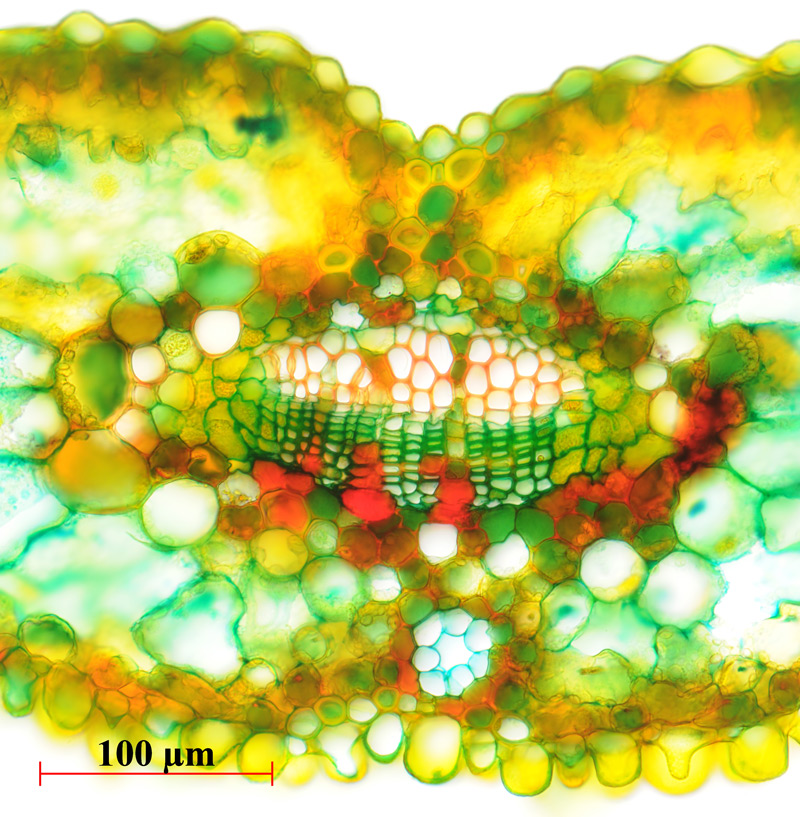
Vascular bundle in the leaf of Metasequoia glyptostroboides

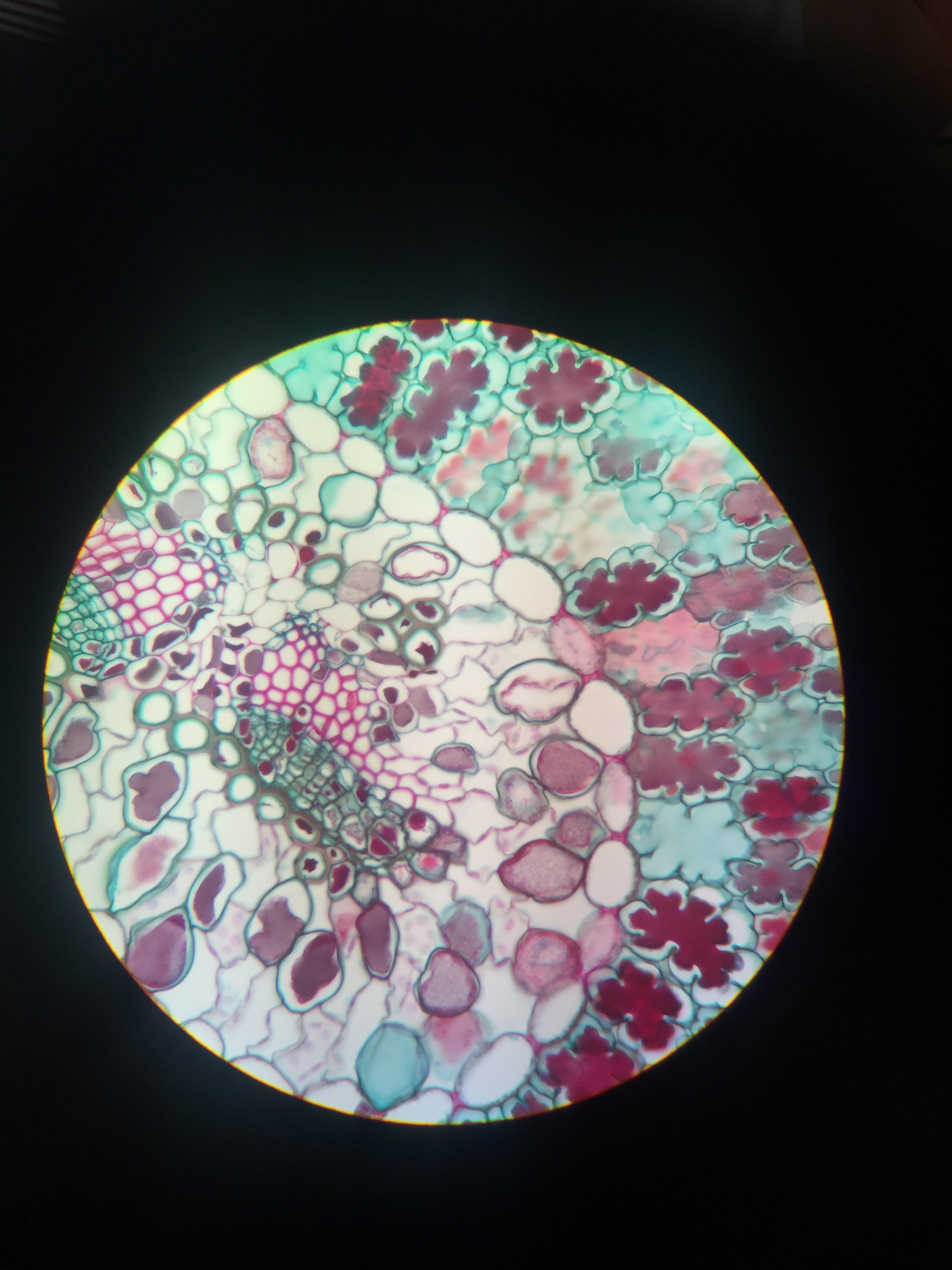
The vascular bundle of pine leaf showing xylem and phloem

A vascular bundle is a part of the transport system in vascular plants. The transport itself happens in the stem, which exists in two forms: xylem and phloem. Both of these tissues are present in a vascular bundle, which includes additional supporting and protective tissues, including the cambium located between xylem and phloem.

The xylem typically lies towards the axis (adaxial) with phloem positioned away from the axis (abaxial). In a stem or root this means that the xylem is closer to the centre of the stem or root while the phloem is closer to the exterior. In a leaf, the adaxial surface of the leaf will usually be the upper side, with the abaxial surface the lower side.

The sugars synthesized by the plant with sun light are transported by the phloem, which is closer to the lower surface. Aphids and leaf hoppers feed on these sugars by tapping into the phloem, which is why aphids and leaf hoppers are typically found on the underside of a leaf rather than on the top. The position of vascular bundles relative to each other may vary considerably: see stele.

Cross section of a leaf showing parts of a vascular bundle

== Bundle-sheath cells ==
The bundle-sheath cells are the photosynthetic cells arranged into a tightly packed sheath around the vein of a leaf. It forms a protective covering on the leaf vein and consists of one or more cell layers, usually parenchyma. Loosely-arranged mesophyll cells lie between the bundle sheath and the leaf surface. The Calvin cycle is confined to the chloroplasts of these bundle sheath cells in C_{4} plants. C_{2} plants also use a variation of this structure.
