= C5H10O3 =

The molecular formula C_{5}H_{10}O_{3} may refer to:

- Diethyl carbonate
- Ethyl lactate
- β-Hydroxy β-methylbutyric acid
- 3-Hydroxyvaleric acid
- γ-Hydroxyvaleric acid
- Roche ester
