= D(−)-tartrate dehydratase =

Enzyme

Identifiers
- EC no.: 4.2.1.81
- CAS no.: 82532-88-5

Databases
- IntEnz: IntEnz view
- BRENDA: BRENDA entry
- ExPASy: NiceZyme view
- KEGG: KEGG entry
- MetaCyc: metabolic pathway
- PRIAM: profile
- PDB structures: RCSB PDB PDBe PDBsum
- Gene Ontology: AmiGO / QuickGO
Search
- PMC: articles
- PubMed: articles
- NCBI: proteins

The enzyme D(−)-tartrate dehydratase (EC 4.2.1.81) catalyzes the chemical reaction

(S,S)-tartrate $\rightleftharpoons$ oxaloacetate + H_{2}O

This enzyme belongs to the family of lyases, specifically the hydro-lyases, which cleave carbon-oxygen bonds. The systematic name of this enzyme class is (S,S)-tartrate hydro-lyase (oxaloacetate-forming). Other names in common use include D-tartrate dehydratase, and (S,S)-tartrate hydro-lyase. It has 2 cofactors: iron and manganese.

== Structural studies ==
As of late 2007, two structures have been solved for this class of enzymes, with PDB accession codes 2DW6 and 2DW7.
