= Robert Donald Cohen =

British physician

- Born: 11 October 1933; Plymouth, England, UK
- Died: 17 October 2014 (aged 81); London, England
- Occupations: Academic physician, medical researcher, and professor of medicine
- Known for: Clinical and Biochemical Aspects of Lactic Acidosis (1976); Cohen-Woods classification

Robert Donald Cohen (11 October 1933 – 17 October 2014) was a British physician, professor of medicine, and one of the leading experts on metabolic medicine.

== Biography ==
After education at Plymouth College and then from 1947 to 1951 at Clifton College, Bristol, Cohen studied from 1951 to 1954 at Trinity College, Cambridge, where he graduated with first class honours in the natural science tripos. He then studied medicine from 1954 to 1958 at the London Hospital Medical College (LHMC). He graduated in 1958 MB BChir (Cantab.) and in 1966 M.D. (Cantab.). He qualified MRCP in 1960. In 1961 he married Barbara J. Boucher, who was also a medical student at LHMC. After junior appointments from 1958 to 1959 at the London Hospital, Robert Cohen was from 1959 to 1960 house physician at the Royal Postgraduate Medical School, where he worked at the endocrine and metabolic unit under Russell Fraser. At LHMC, Cohen was in 1960–1965 lecturer in medicine, in 1967–1969 senior lecturer, in 1969–1974 reader in medicine, in 1974–1982 professor of metabolic medicine, and in 1982–1995 professor of medicine and director of the academic medical unit. After LHMC merged in 1995, he was in 1995–1999 professor of medicine and director of the academic medical unit at Barts and The London School of Medicine and Dentistry. He retired as professor emeritus in 1999.

His research was primarily focused on biochemical functions of the liver, foetal programming and acid base disorders ... His group were the first to demonstrate the modifications by diabetes mellitus, metabolic acidosis and maternal malnutrition of functional zonation of hepatic lobules, information that continues to inform therapeutic developments.

Cohen was elected FRCP in 1971. He was chair of the editorial board of Clinical Science from 1973 to 1975. He gave the Bradshaw Lecture in 1981. He was an active member of numerous medical committees. He was elected FMedSci in 1998. He chaired from 1994 to 2001 the Imperial Cancer Research Fund and played a central role in its merger in 2002 with The Cancer Research Campaign to create Cancer Research UK. He was appointed CBE in 1997.

Upon his death Cohen was survived by his widow, a daughter, a son, and five grandsons.

== Lactic acidosis ==
In 1961 William E. Huckabee (1926–1986) described and defined the clinical problem of lactic acidosis. Cohen and H. Frank Woods introduced in 1976 what is now called the Cohen-Woods classification of the causes of lactic acidosis.

They classify as type A, the traditional variety, due to hypoxia and lack of tissue perfusion. The main theme is type B, lactic acidosis of other origins, which is considered fully with an analysis of all published causes. These are divided into:
(1) diabetes, liver disease, and other serious diseases
(2) phenformin, fructose, and other drugs
(3) hereditary.

== Selected publications ==
=== Articles ===
- with W. A. H. Rushton: Rushton, W. A. H.; Cohen, R. D. (13 February 1954). "Visual purple level and the course of dark adaptation". Nature. 173 (4398): 301–302. Bibcode:1954Natur.173..301R. doi:10.1038/173301a0. PMID 13144746. S2CID 5276567.
- COHEN RD (October 1963). "Water and electrolyte metabolism during the treatment of myxoedema". Clinical Science. 25: 293–304. PMID 14070913. (Cohen's MD thesis)
- with J. M. Ledingham: Ledingham, J. M.; Cohen, R. D. (25 January 1964). "Changes in the extracellular fluid volume and cardiac output during the development of experimental renal hypertension". Can Med Assoc J. 90 (4): 292–294. PMC 1922480. PMID 14111738.
- with H. G. Lloyd-Thomas: Cohen, R. D.; Lloyd-Thomas, H. G. (6 August 1966). "Exercise electrocardiogram in myxoedema". Br Med J. 2 (5509): 327–330. doi:10.1136/bmj.2.5509.327. PMC 1943154. PMID 5920653.
- with T. M. Savege, J. D. Ward, and B. R. Simpson: Savege, T. M.; Ward, J. D.; Simpson, B. R.; Cohen, R. D. (4 January 1969). "Treatment of severe salicylate poisoning by forced alkaline diuresis". Br Med J. 1 (5635): 35–36. doi:10.1136/bmj.1.5635.35. PMC 1981842. PMID 5761895.
- with D. E. Barnardo and R. A. Iles: Barnardo, D. E.; Cohen, R. D.; Iles, R. A. (7 November 1970). ""Idiopathic" lactic and betahydroxybutyric acidosis". Br Med J. 4 (5731): 348–349. doi:10.1136/bmj.4.5731.348-a. PMC 1819685. PMID 5472807.
- with P. E. Belchetz, Margaret H. Lloyd, and R. G. S. Johns: Belchetz, P. E.; Lloyd, M. H.; Johns, R. G. S.; Cohen, R. D. (2 June 1973). "Effect of Late Night Calcium Supplements on Overnight Urinary Calcium Excretion in Premenopausal and Postmenopausal Women". Br Med J. 2 (5865): 510–512. doi:10.1136/bmj.2.5865.510. PMC 1589586. PMID 4714465.
- with P E Belchetz, J L O'Riordan, and S Tomlinson: Belchetz, P. E.; Cohen, R. D.; O'Riordan, J. L.; Tomlinson, S. (20 March 1976). "Factitious hypercalcaemia". Br Med J. 1 (6011): 690–691. doi:10.1136/bmj.1.6011.690. PMC 1639109. PMID 1252885.
- with Barry Barber and Maureen Scholes: Barber, Barry; Cohen, Robert D.; Scholes, Maureen (1976). "A review of the London Hospital computer project". Medical Informatics. 1 (1): 61–72. doi:10.3109/14639237609017805.
- with R A Iles, A H Rist, and P G Baron: Iles, R. A.; Cohen, R. D.; Rist, A. H.; Baron, P. G. (15 April 1977). "The mechanism of inhibition by acidosis of gluconeogenesis from lactate in rat liver". Biochemical Journal. 164 (1): 185–191. doi:10.1042/bj1640185. PMC 1164773. PMID 18143.
- with H. Frank Woods: Cohen, R. D.; Woods, H. F. (February 1983). "Lactic acidosis revisited". Diabetes. 32 (2): 181–191. doi:10.2337/diab.32.2.181. PMID 6337898.
- with N. D. Martin and G. J. Snodgrass: Martin, N. D.; Snodgrass, G. J.; Cohen, R. D. (1984). "Idiopathic infantile hypercalcaemia—a continuing enigma". Archives of Disease in Childhood. 59 (7): 605–613. doi:10.1136/adc.59.7.605. PMC 1628928. PMID 6465928.
- with J S Beech, S R Williams, and R A Iles: Beech, J. S.; Williams, S. R.; Cohen, R. D.; Iles, R. A. (1 November 1989). "Gluconeogenesis and the protection of hepatic intracellular pH during diabetic ketoacidosis in rats". Biochemical Journal. 263 (3): 737–744. doi:10.1042/bj2630737. PMC 1133494. PMID 2512912.

=== Books ===
- with H. Frank Woods: Clinical and Biochemical Aspects of Lactic Acidosis. Oxford: Blackwell Scientific Publications. 1976; xii+276 pages
- as editor with B. Lewis, K. G. M. M. Alberti, A. M. Denman: The Metabolic and Molecular Basis of Acquired Disease, Vols. 1 & 2. London: Baillière Tindall. 1990. ISBN 0-7020-1493-1; 2082 pages
- Cohen, Robert D. (2011). Man and the Liver from Myth to Science. Troubador Publishing. ISBN 9781848767966.
- Cohen, Robert D. (2012). Nephrosapiens: A History of Man's Thinking about the Kidney. Troubador Publishing. ISBN 9781780882192.
- Cohen, Robert D. (2013). Splancreas: And Other Offal. Troubador Publishing Limited. ISBN 978-1780883960; 160 pages
- Cohen, Robert D. (2013). A Muscle Odyssey. Troubador Publishing. ISBN 9781780884738.
- Cohen, Robert D. (2013). Skin and Bones. Troubador Publishing. ISBN 9781780884936.
- Cohen, Robert D. (2013). Corpus Hominis: Memoirs of an Academic Physician. Troubador Publishing. ISBN 9781783060672.
- Cohen, Robert D. (2014). Movement and Motion. Troubador Publishing. ISBN 9781784620004.
- Cohen, Robert D. (2014). Ladders: The History and Science of Elevation. Troubador Publishing. ISBN 9781783063253.
