= Decylcitrate synthase =

Class of enzymes

decylcitrate synthase

Identifiers
- EC no.: 2.3.3.2
- CAS no.: 9068-72-8

Databases
- IntEnz: IntEnz view
- BRENDA: BRENDA entry
- ExPASy: NiceZyme view
- KEGG: KEGG entry
- MetaCyc: metabolic pathway
- PRIAM: profile
- PDB structures: RCSB PDB PDBe PDBsum
- Gene Ontology: AmiGO / QuickGO
Search
- PMC: articles
- PubMed: articles
- NCBI: proteins

Decylcitrate synthase (EC 2.3.3.2) is an enzyme that catalyzes the chemical reaction in enzymology.

lauroyl-CoA + H_{2}O + oxaloacetate $\rightleftharpoons$ (2S,3S)-2-hydroxytridecane-1,2,3-tricarboxylate + CoA

The 3 substrates of this enzyme are lauroyl-CoA, H_{2}O, and oxaloacetate, whereas its two products are (2S,3S)-2-hydroxytridecane-1,2,3-tricarboxylate and CoA.

This enzyme belongs to the family of transferases, specifically those acyltransferases that convert acyl groups into alkyl groups on transfer. The systematic name of this enzyme class is dodecanoyl-CoA:oxaloacetate C-dodecanoyltransferase (thioester-hydrolysing, 1-carboxyundecyl-forming). Other names in common use include 2-decylcitrate synthase, (2S,3S)-2-hydroxytridecane-1,2,3-tricarboxylate oxaloacetate-lyase, and (CoA-acylating).
