= C6H6O5 =

The molecular formula C_{6}H_{6}O_{5} may refer to:

- Maleylacetic acid, a chemical compound produced in the biodegradation of catechin by Bradyrhizobium japonicum
- Pentahydroxybenzene, a chemical compound whose structure consists of a benzene ring with five hydroxy groups (–OH) as substituents
- Zymonic acid
