= Aspartate dehydrogenase =

Identifiers
- EC no.: 1.4.1.21
- CAS no.: 37278-97-0

Databases
- IntEnz: IntEnz view
- BRENDA: BRENDA entry
- ExPASy: NiceZyme view
- KEGG: KEGG entry
- MetaCyc: metabolic pathway
- PRIAM: profile
- PDB structures: RCSB PDB PDBe PDBsum
Search
- PMC: articles
- PubMed: articles
- NCBI: proteins

Aspartate dehydrogenase (EC 1.4.1.21) is an enzyme that catalyzes the chemical reaction

aspartic acid
+ NAD^{+}
H_{2}O
H^{+}
H_{2}O
H^{+}
oxaloacetic acid
+ NADP + NH_{3}

The three substrates of this enzyme are L-aspartic acid, water, and oxidised nicotinamide adenine dinucleotide (NAD^{+}}. Its products are oxaloacetic acid, ammonia, reduced NADH, and a proton. Nicotinamide adenine dinucleotide phosphate can be used as an alternative cofactor.

This enzyme belongs to the family of oxidoreductases, specifically those acting on the CH-NH2 group of donors with NAD+ or NADP+ as acceptor. The systematic name of this enzyme class is L-aspartate:NAD(P)+ oxidoreductase (deaminating). Other names in common use include NAD-dependent aspartate dehydrogenase, NADH2-dependent aspartate dehydrogenase, and NADP+-dependent aspartate dehydrogenase. This enzyme participates in nicotinate and nicotinamide metabolism.

== Structural studies ==
As of late 2007, only one structure has been solved for this class of enzymes, with the PDB accession code 2DC1.
