= Pyruvate carboxylase deficiency =

Inherited deficiency causing lactic acidosis

- Other names: Leigh necrotizing encephalopathy due to pyruvate carboxylase deficiency, Ataxia with lactic acidosis II
- Specialty: Endocrinology
- Symptoms: lactic acidosis, liver failure, hepatomegaly, demyelination and poor coordination
- Complications: lactic acidosis
- Duration: congenital
- Types: A, B, C
- Causes: mutation to gene for pyruvate carboxylase
- Treatment: anaplerotic therapy, low-fat diet

Pyruvate carboxylase deficiency is an inherited disorder that causes lactic acid to accumulate in the blood. High levels of these substances can damage the body's organs and tissues, particularly in the nervous system. Pyruvate carboxylase deficiency is a rare condition, with an estimated incidence of 1 in 250,000 births worldwide. Type A of the disease appears to be much more common in some Algonkian Indian tribes in eastern Canada, while the type B disease is more present in European populations.

== Signs and symptoms ==
Pyruvate carboxylase deficiency causes lactic acidosis and hyperammonaemia. Lactic acidosis may then lead to liver failure, hepatomegaly, reduced ketone body synthesis, and demyelination of neurons.

== Genetics ==
Pyruvate carboxylase deficiency has an autosomal recessive pattern of inheritance.

Pyruvate carboxylase deficiency is caused by mutations in the PC gene. The PC gene provides instructions for making an enzyme called pyruvate carboxylase.

This condition is inherited in an autosomal recessive pattern, which means two copies of the gene must be inherited for the disorder to be present. The parents of an individual with an autosomal recessive disorder are carriers of one copy of the altered gene, but do not show signs and symptoms of the disorder.

== Mechanism ==
Pyruvate carboxylase is active in mitochondria in cells. It is involved in the generation of glucose through gluconeogenesis. By generating oxaloacetate, it catalyses an important anaplerotic reaction that maintains the citric acid cycle to generate energy by aerobic respiration. Pyruvate carboxylase also plays a role in the formation of the myelin sheath that surrounds certain nerve cells, and the production of neurotransmitters for communication between neurons.

Mutations in the PC gene reduce the amount of pyruvate carboxylase in cells or disrupt the enzyme's activity. The missing or altered enzyme cannot carry out its essential role in generating glucose, which impairs the body's ability to make energy in mitochondria. Additionally, a loss of pyruvate carboxylase allows potentially toxic compounds, such as lactic acid and ammonia, to build up and damage organs and tissues. Loss of pyruvate carboxylase function in the nervous system, particularly the role of the enzyme in myelin formation and neurotransmitter production, may contribute to the neurological features of pyruvate carboxylase deficiency.

== Diagnosis ==
=== Classification ===
There are at least three types of pyruvate carboxylase deficiency, which are distinguished by the severity of their signs and symptoms.

==== Type A ====
Type A, which has been identified mostly in people from North America, has moderately severe symptoms that begin in infancy. Characteristic features include developmental delay and a buildup of lactic acid in the blood (lactic acidosis). Increased acidity in the blood can lead to vomiting, abdominal pain, extreme tiredness (fatigue), muscle weakness, and difficulty breathing. In some cases, episodes of lactic acidosis are triggered by an illness or periods without food. Children with pyruvate carboxylase deficiency type A typically survive only into early childhood.

==== Type B ====
Pyruvate carboxylase deficiency type B has life-threatening signs and symptoms that become apparent shortly after birth. This form of the condition has been reported mostly in Europe, particularly France. Affected infants have severe lactic acidosis, a build-up of ammonia in the blood (hyperammonemia), and liver failure. They experience neurological problems including weak muscle tone (hypotonia), abnormal movements, seizures, and coma. Infants with this form of the condition usually survive for less than 3 months after birth.

==== Type C ====
This type is characterised by its late onset and is associated with isolated mild intellectual delay.

== Treatment ==
Pyruvate carboxylase deficiency treatment typically consists of providing the body with alternate sources of energy (anaplerotic therapy). This may include a diet rich in proteins and carbohydrates but not lipids.

Acutely, triheptanoin may be administered as a source of acetyl-CoA.

== Epidemiology ==
Pyruvate carboxylase deficiency is very rare, and is estimated to affect around 1 in 250,000 people.
