= Lactic acidosis =

Metabolic medical condition

Lactic acid
- L-(+)-lactic acid
- Specialty: Endocrinology

Lactic acidosis refers to the process leading to the production of lactate by anaerobic metabolism. It increases hydrogen ion concentration tending to the state of acidemia or low pH. The result can be detected with high levels of lactate and low levels of bicarbonate. This is usually considered the result of illness but also results from strenuous exercise. The effect on pH is moderated by the presence of respiratory compensation.

Lactic acidosis is usually the result of tissue hypoxia which is not the same as arterial hypoxia. Adequate circulation of blood and perfusion of metabolizing tissue to meet demand is necessary to prevent tissue hypoxia. Lactic acidosis can also be the result of illnesses, medications, poisonings or inborn errors of metabolism that interfere directly with oxygen utilization by cells.

The symptoms are generally attributable to the underlying cause, but may include nausea, vomiting, shortness of breath, and generalised weakness.

The diagnosis is made on biochemical analysis of blood (often initially on arterial blood gas samples), and once confirmed, generally prompts an investigation to establish the underlying cause to treat the acidosis. In some situations, hemofiltration (purification of the blood) is temporarily required. In rare chronic forms of lactic acidosis caused by mitochondrial disease, a specific diet or dichloroacetate may be used. The prognosis of lactic acidosis depends largely on the underlying cause; in some situations (such as severe infections), it indicates an increased risk of death.

== Classification ==
The Cohen–Woods classification categorizes causes of lactic acidosis as:

- Type A: Decreased tissue oxygenation (e.g., from decreased blood flow)
- Type B
  - B1: Underlying diseases (sometimes causing type A)
  - B2: Medication or intoxication
  - B3: Inborn error of metabolism

== Signs and symptoms ==
Lactic acidosis is commonly found in people who are unwell, such as those with severe heart and/or lung disease, a severe infection with sepsis, the systemic inflammatory response syndrome due to another cause, severe physical trauma, or severe depletion of body fluids. Symptoms in humans include all those of typical metabolic acidosis (nausea, vomiting, generalized muscle weakness, and laboured and deep breathing).

== Causes ==
The several different causes of lactic acidosis include:

- Genetic conditions
  - Biotinidase deficiency, multiple carboxylase deficiency, or nongenetic deficiencies of biotin
  - Diabetes mellitus and deafness
  - Fructose 1,6-bisphosphatase deficiency
  - Glucose-6-phosphatase deficiency
  - GRACILE syndrome
  - Mitochondrial encephalomyopathy, lactic acidosis, and stroke-like episodes
  - Pyruvate dehydrogenase deficiency
  - Pyruvate carboxylase deficiency
  - Leigh syndrome
- Drugs
  - Linezolid
  - Paracetamol/acetaminophen poisoning
  - Metformin: this risk is low (less than 10 cases for 100,000 patient years), but the risk of metformin-induced lactic acidosis (MALA) increases in certain situations where both the plasma levels of metformin are increased and lactate clearance is impaired. The older related and now withdrawn drug phenformin carried a much higher risk of lactic acidosis.
  - Isoniazid toxicity
  - Propofol
  - Epinephrine
  - Propylene glycol (D-lactic acidosis)
  - Nucleoside reverse-transcriptase inhibitors
  - Abacavir/dolutegravir/lamivudine
  - Emtricitabine/tenofovir
  - Potassium cyanide (cyanide poisoning)
  - Fialuridine
- Other
  - Thiamine deficiency (especially during TPN)
  - Impaired delivery of oxygen to cells in the tissues (e.g., from impaired blood flow (hypoperfusion))
  - Bleeding
  - Polymyositis
  - Ethanol toxicity
  - Sepsis
  - Shock
  - Advanced liver disease
  - Diabetic ketoacidosis
  - Excessive exercise (overtraining)
  - Regional hypoperfusion (e.g., bowel ischemia or marked cellulitis)
  - Cancers such as Non-Hodgkin's and Burkitt lymphomas
  - Pheochromocytoma
  - Tumor lysis syndrome
  - D-lactic acidosis due to intestinal bacterial flora production in short gut syndrome

== Pathophysiology ==
Glucose metabolism begins with glycolysis, in which the molecule is broken down into pyruvate in ten enzymatic steps. A significant proportion of pyruvate is converted into lactate (the blood lactate-to-pyruvate ratio is normally 10:1). The human metabolism produces about 20 mmol/kg of lactic acid every 24 hours. This happens predominantly in tissues (especially muscle) that have high levels of the "A" isoform of the enzyme lactate dehydrogenase (LDHA), which predominantly converts pyruvate into lactate. The lactate is carried by the bloodstream to other tissues where it is converted back to pyruvate by the "B" isoform of LDH (LDHB). Firstly there is gluconeogenesis in the liver (as well as the kidney and some other tissues), where lactate is converted into pyruvate and then into glucose; this is known as the Cori cycle. In addition, pyruvate generated from lactate can be oxidized to acetyl-CoA, which can enter the citric acid cycle to enable ATP production by oxidative phosphorylation.

Elevations in lactate are either a consequence of increased production or of decreased metabolism. With regard to metabolism, this predominantly takes place in the liver (70%), which explains that lactate levels may be elevated in the setting of liver disease.

In "type A" lactic acidosis, the production of lactate is attributable to insufficient oxygen for aerobic metabolism. If there is no oxygen available for the parts of the glucose metabolism that require oxygen (citric acid cycle and oxidative phosphorylation), excess pyruvate will be converted in excess lactate. In "type B" lactic acidosis the lactate accumulates because there is a mismatch between glycolysis activity and the remainder of glucose metabolism. Examples are situations where the sympathetic nervous system is highly active (e.g. severe asthma). There is controversy as to whether elevated lactate in acute illness can be attributed to tissue hypoxia; there is limited empirical support for this theoretical notion.

== Diagnosis ==
Acid-base disturbances such as lactic acidosis are typically first assessed using arterial blood gas tests. Testing of venous blood is also available as an alternative as they are effectively interchangeable. Normally resulting lactate concentrations are in the range indicated below:

	mg/dL	mM
Venous blood	4.5–19.8	0.5–2.2
Arterial blood	4.5–14.4	0.5–1.6

Lactic acidosis is classically defined as an elevated lactate together with pH < 7.35 and bicarbonate below 20 mmol/L, but this is not required as lactic acidosis may exist together with other acid-base abnormalities that may affect these two parameters.

== Treatment ==
If elevated lactate is present in acute illness, supporting the oxygen supply and blood flow are key initial steps. Some vasopressors (drugs that augment the blood pressure) are less effective when lactate levels are high, and some agents that stimulate the beta-2 adrenergic receptor can elevate the lactate further.

Direct removal of lactate from the body (e.g. with hemofiltration or dialysis) is difficult, with limited evidence for benefit; it may not be possible to keep up with the lactate production.

Limited evidence supports the use of sodium bicarbonate solutions to improve the pH (which is associated with increased carbon dioxide generation and may reduce the calcium levels).

Lactic acidosis caused by inherited mitochondrial disorders (type B3) may be treated with a ketogenic diet and possibly with dichloroacetate (DCA), although this may be complicated by peripheral neuropathy and has a weak evidence base.

== Prognosis ==
Mild and transient elevations in lactate have limited impact on mortality, whereas sustained and severe lactate elevations are associated with a high mortality.

The mortality of lactic acidosis in people taking metformin was previously reported to be 50%, but in more recent reports this was closer to 25%.

== Other animals ==
=== Reptiles ===
Reptiles, which rely primarily on anaerobic energy metabolism (glycolysis) for intense movements, can be particularly susceptible to lactic acidosis. In particular, during the capture of large crocodiles, the animals' use of their glycolytic muscles often alters the blood's pH to a point where they are unable to respond to stimuli or move. Cases are recorded in which particularly large crocodiles which put up extreme resistance to capture later died of the resulting pH imbalance. Certain turtle species have been found to be capable of tolerating high levels of lactic acid without experiencing the effects of lactic acidosis. Painted turtles hibernate buried in mud or underwater and do not resurface for the entire winter. As a result, they rely on lactic acid fermentation to provide the majority of their energy needs. Adaptations in particular in the turtle's blood composition and shell allow it to tolerate high levels of lactic acid accumulation. In the anoxic conditions where fermentation is dominant, calcium levels in the blood plasma increase. This calcium serves as a buffer, reacting with the excess lactate to form the precipitate calcium lactate. This precipitate is suggested to be reabsorbed by the shell and skeleton, thereby removing it from the bloodstream; studies examining turtles that have been subjected to prolonged anoxic conditions have up to 45% of their lactate stored within their skeletal structure.

=== Ruminants ===
In ruminant livestock, the cause of clinically serious lactic acidosis is different from the causes described above.

In domesticated ruminants, lactic acidosis may occur as a consequence of ingesting large amounts of grain, especially when the rumen population is poorly adapted to deal with grain. Activity of various rumen organisms results in accumulation of various volatile fatty acids (normally, mostly acetic, propionic, and butyric acids), which are partially dissociated. Although some lactate is normally produced in the rumen, it is normally metabolized by such organisms as Megasphaera elsdenii and, to a lesser extent, Selenomonas ruminantium and some other organisms. With high grain consumption, the concentration of dissociated organic acids can become quite high, resulting in rumen pH dropping below 6. Within this lower pH range, Lactobacillus spp. (producing lactate and hydrogen ions) are favored, and M. elsdenii and S. ruminantium are inhibited, tending to result in a considerable rise of lactate and hydrogen ion concentrations in the rumen fluid. The pKa of lactic acid is low, about 3.9, versus, for example, 4.8 for acetic acid; this contributes to the considerable drop in rumen pH which can occur.

Because of the high solute concentration of the rumen fluid under such conditions, considerable water is translocated from the blood to the rumen along the osmotic potential gradient, resulting in dehydration which cannot be relieved by drinking, and which can ultimately lead to hypovolemic shock. As more lactate accumulates and rumen pH drops, the ruminal concentration of undissociated lactic acid increases. Undissociated lactic acid can cross the rumen wall to the blood, where it dissociates, lowering blood pH. Both L and D isomers of lactic acid are produced in the rumen; these isomers are metabolized by different metabolic pathways, and activity of the principal enzyme involved in metabolism of the D isomer declines greatly with lower pH, tending to result in an increased ratio of D:L isomers as acidosis progresses.

Measures for preventing lactic acidosis in ruminants include avoidance of excessive amounts of grain in the diet, and gradual introduction of grain over a period of several days, to develop a rumen population capable of safely dealing with a relatively high grain intake. Administration of lasalocid or monensin in feed can reduce risk of lactic acidosis in ruminants, inhibiting most of the lactate-producing bacterial species without inhibiting the major lactate fermenters. Also, using a higher feeding frequency to provide the daily grain ration can allow higher grain intake without reducing the pH of the rumen fluid.

Treatment of lactic acidosis in ruminants may involve intravenous administration of dilute sodium bicarbonate, oral administration of magnesium hydroxide, and/or repeated removal of rumen fluids and replacement with water (followed by reinoculation with rumen organisms, if necessary).
