= Anaplerotic reactions =

Chemical reaction

Anaplerotic reactions, or Anaplerosis, coined by Hans Kornberg and originating from the Greek ἀνά= 'up' and πληρόω= 'to fill', are chemical reactions that form intermediates of a metabolic pathway. Examples of such are found in the citric acid cycle (TCA cycle). In normal function of this cycle for respiration, concentrations of TCA intermediates remain constant; however, many biosynthetic reactions also use these molecules as a substrate. Anaplerosis is the act of replenishing TCA cycle intermediates that have been extracted for biosynthesis (in what are called anaplerotic reactions).

The TCA cycle is a hub of metabolism, with central importance in both energy production and biosynthesis. Therefore, it is crucial for the cell to regulate concentrations of TCA cycle metabolites in the mitochondria. Anaplerotic flux must balance cataplerotic flux in order to retain homeostasis of cellular metabolism.

== Reactions of anaplerotic metabolism ==
There are five major reactions classed as anaplerotic, and it is estimated that the production of oxaloacetate from pyruvate has the most physiologic importance.

From	To	Reaction	Notes
Pyruvate	Oxaloacetate	Pyruvate + HCO_{3}^{−} + ATP $\longrightarrow$ Oxaloacetate + ADP + P_{i} + H_{2}O	This reaction is catalysed by pyruvate carboxylase, an enzyme activated by acetyl-CoA, indicating a lack of oxaloacetate. It occurs in animal mitochondria. Most important anaplerotic reaction; depending on severity, deficiency causes lactic acidosis, severe psychomotor deficiency or death in infancy Pyruvate can also be converted to L-malate, another intermediate, in a similar way.
Aspartate	Oxaloacetate	-	This is a reversible reaction forming oxaloacetate from aspartate in a transamination reaction, via aspartate transaminase.
Glutamate	α-Ketoglutarate	Glutamate + NAD^{+} + H_{2}O $\longrightarrow$ NH_{4}^{+} + α-Ketoglutarate + NADH.	This reaction is catalysed by glutamate-dehydrogenase.
Propionyl-CoA	Succinyl-CoA	-	Significant sources of propionyl-CoA are the essential amino acids: valine, methionine, isoleucine, threonine; odd-chained fatty acids and propionic acid from intestinal bacteria. When odd-chain fatty acids are oxidized, one molecule of succinyl-CoA is formed per fatty acid. The final enzyme is methylmalonyl-CoA mutase. Triheptanoin (fat with three heptanoic (C7:0) fatty acids) may be used to treat pyruvate carboxylase deficiency
Adenylosuccinate	Fumarate	Adenylosuccinate $\longrightarrow$ AMP + Fumarate	This reaction is catalysed by adenylosuccinate lyase and occurs in purine synthesis and purine nucleotide cycle. Defect of this enzyme causes psychomotor retardation.

The malate is created by PEP carboxylase and malate dehydrogenase in the cytosol. Malate, in the mitochondrial matrix, can be used to make pyruvate (catalyzed by malic enzyme) or oxaloacetic acid, both of which can enter the citric acid cycle.

Glutamine can also be used to produce oxaloacetate during anaplerotic reactions in various cell types through "glutaminolysis," which is also seen in many c-Myc transformed cells. Anaplerotic enzymes mediate an alternative pathway to insulin secretion by aiding the production of cytosolic signal molecules. Pancreatic β-cells, which regulate blood glucose level by secreting insulin, contain high a mounts of pyruvate carboxylase. A decrease in insulin secretion and anaplerotic activity has been found in β-cells that do not have hypoxia-inducible factor-1 beta.

== Diseases of anaplerotic metabolism ==
Pyruvate carboxylase deficiency is an inherited metabolic disorder where anaplerosis is greatly reduced. Other anaplerotic substrates such as the odd-carbon-containing triglyceride triheptanoin can be used to treat this disorder.
