= Committee on Toxicity =

UK scientific committee

The Committee on Toxicity of Chemicals in Food, Consumer Products and the Environment (COT) is a UK independent scientific committee that provides advice to the Food Standards Agency, the Department of Health and other government departments and agencies on matters concerning the toxicity of chemicals.

It has a number of working groups that publish reports, e.g. previously on phytoestrogens. It also works with other scientific advisory committees to develop new guidance, for example for the integration of epidemiological and toxicological evidence.

Pharmacologist Frank Woods was made a Commander of the Order of the British Empire (CBE) in the 2001 Birthday Honours, for services to the committee.

The current chair is toxicologist Professor Alan Boobis.
