= Fialuridine =

Chemical compound

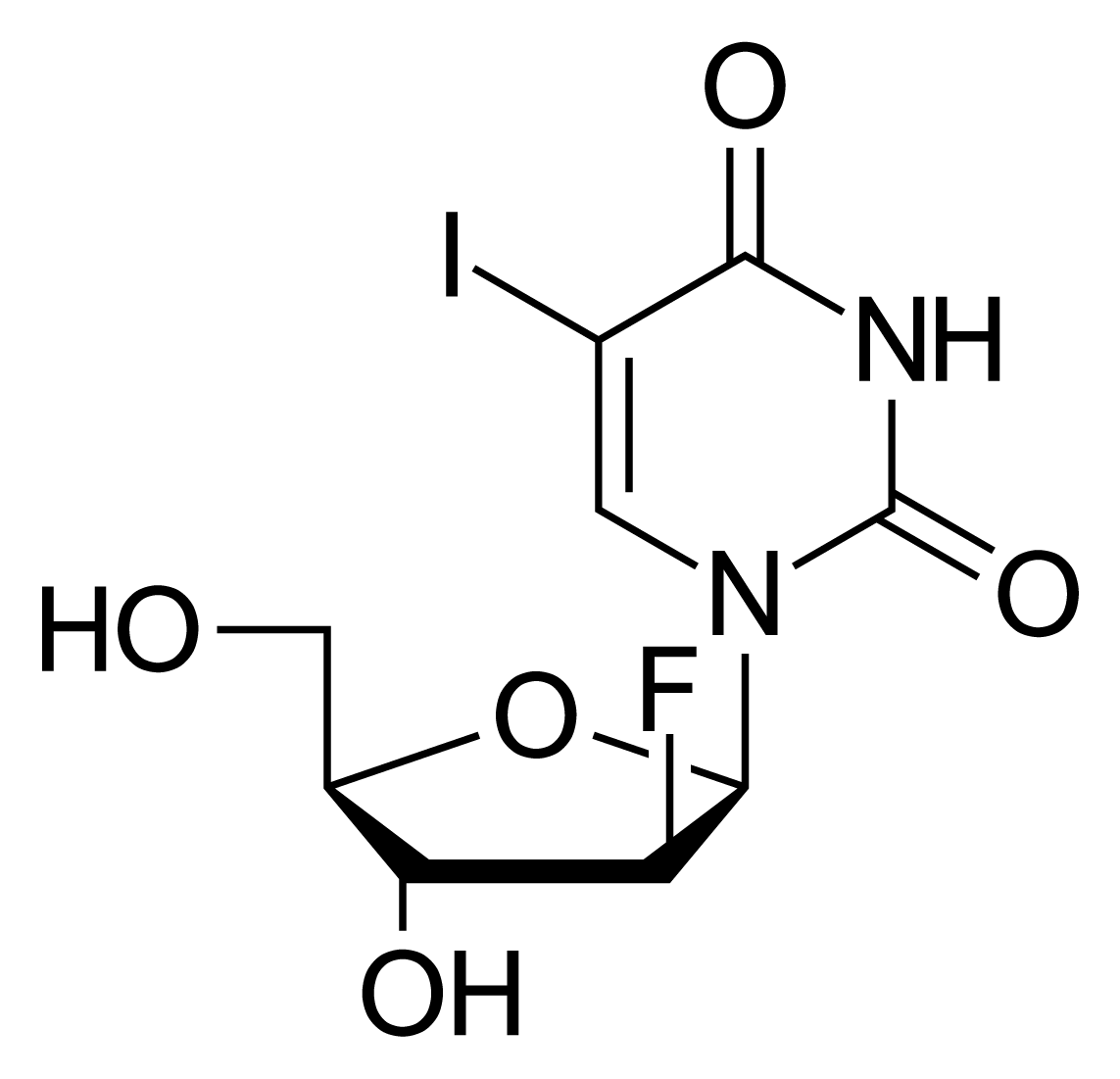

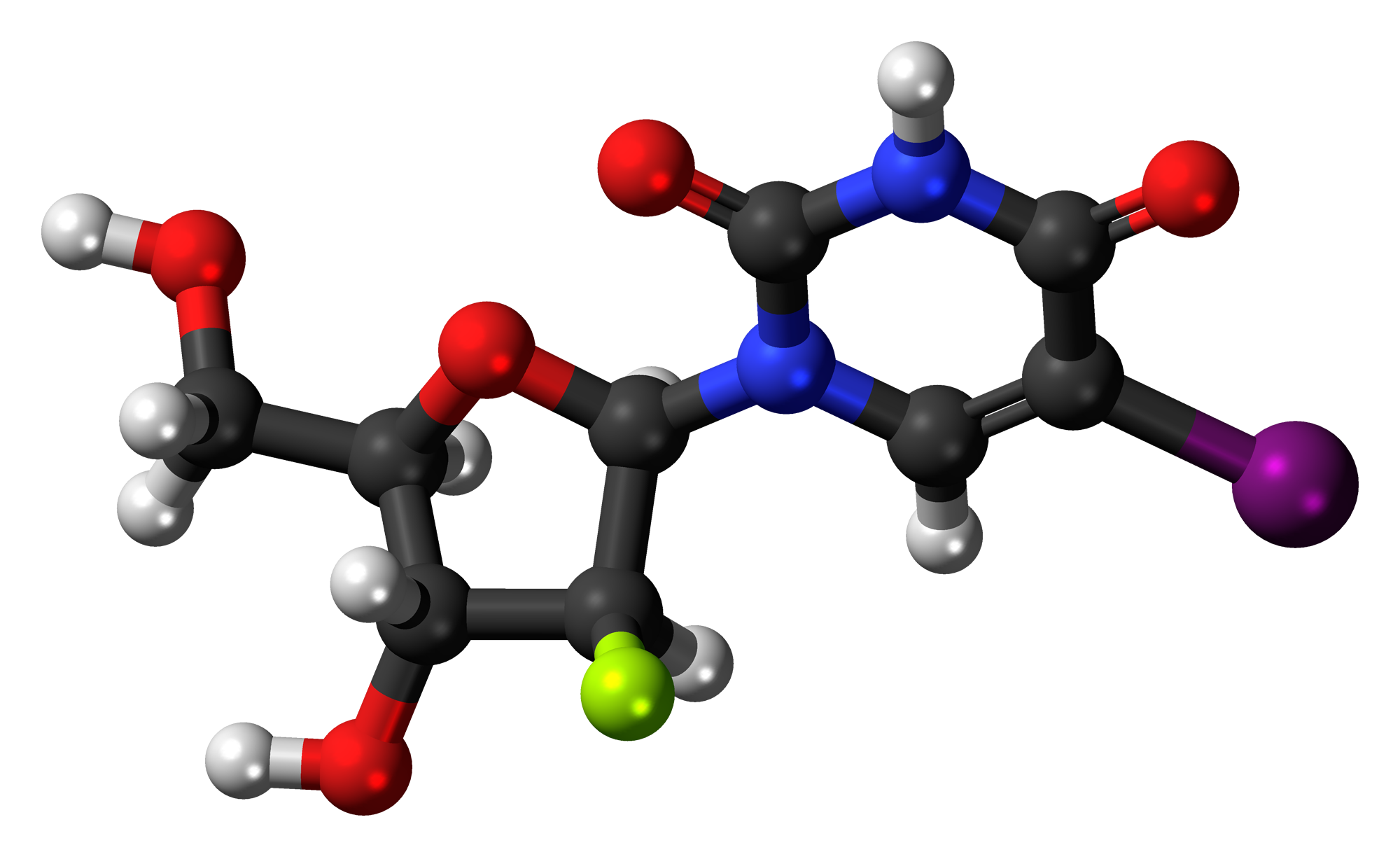

Clinical data
- Other names: 2'-Fluoro-5-iodoarauracil
- ATC code: none

Identifiers
- IUPAC name: 1-[(2R,3S,4R,5R)-3-Fluoro-4-hydroxy-5-(hydroxymethyl)- 2-tetrahydrofuranyl]-5-iodopyrimidine-2,4-dione
- CAS Number: 69123-98-4
- PubChem CID: 50313
- ChemSpider: 45627
- UNII: 53T7IN77LC
- KEGG: D04181
- ChEMBL: ChEMBL271475
- NIAID ChemDB: 070971

Chemical and physical data
- Formula: C_{9}H_{10}FIN_{2}O_{5}
- Molar mass: 372.091 g·mol^{−1}
- 3D model (JSmol): Interactive image
- SMILES: c1c(c(=O)[nH]c(=O)n1[C@H]2[C@H]([C@@H]([C@H](O2)CO)O)F)I
- InChI: InChI=1S/C9H10FIN2O5/c10-5-6(15)4(2-14)18-8(5)13-1-3(11)7(16)12-9(13)17/h1,4-6,8,14-15H,2H2,(H,12,16,17)/t4-,5+,6-,8-/m1/s1; Key:IPVFGAYTKQKGBM-BYPJNBLXSA-N

Fialuridine (FIAU) is a synthetic, solid, fluorinated nucleoside analogue of thymidine that was investigated as a treatment for chronic hepatitis B virus infection (HBV) in the early 1990s. Its effectiveness was evaluated during a Phase II clinical trial over a six-month course, with 24 patients treated. FIAU was provided by Oclassen Pharmaceuticals and administered under an Investigational New Drug Application held by Eli Lilly and Company.

Administration of FIAU resulted in antiviral activity, alongside several side effects which resulted in the termination of some clinical trials. Investigations found that affected patients suffered a depletion of mitochondrial DNA (mtDNA) in both liver and muscle tissue, establishing mitochondrial dysfunction as a contributing mechanism to toxicity. The FIAU trial is considered a landmark case in drug production and influenced subsequent drug safety assessments regarding mitochondrial toxicity.

== Medical uses ==
The primary target for the development of FIAU was the treatment of chronic hepatitis B virus (HBV) infection. FIAU is a nucleoside analogue, meaning that the molecule is similar to the building blocks of deoxyribonucleic acid, DNA. Once it enters the body and it is phosphorylated by viral thymidine kinase the FIAU is activated. The FIAU will then be incorporated into the viral DNA while the virus is dividing. The virus will begin building a new DNA strand and use FIAU as a ‘building block’, but as it is an analogue and not a real nucleotide the DNA chain cannot be completed. FIAU was a potent inhibitor of HBV replication, thus resulting in a large decrease in serum HBV DNA levels.

FIAU (and its parent drug FIAC) was also studied for the use in treating herpes simplex virus (HSV), varicella zoster virus (VZV), and cytomegalovirus (CMV). Nowadays FIAU is an important compound in the field of drug-induced liver injury research. FIAU, despite its early promise, was never put on the market and has never been available for medicinal use.

In the initial clinical trials FIAU was a potent inhibitor of the HBV replication, as patients experienced a large decrease in serum HBV DNA levels. And in the high-dosed groups the HBV DNA was reduced by 70 to 95%. But even though the treatment was very promising, the antiviral effect was almost always temporary.

== Adverse effects ==
During the trials there were 5 deaths from acute liver failure and 2 other patients were saved from death by receiving a liver transplant. The toxicity of FIAU was notably delayed as the severe effects became apparent after 13 weeks of treatment. The specific toxic symptoms include: fatigue, skin rash, nausea, bone marrow suppression, seizures, pain in the arms and legs, hepatic (liver) failure (with mild jaundice), lactic acidosis (severe accumulation of lactic acid in the blood), pancreatitis, micro versicular steatosis (marked accumulation of the fat within the cells of the liver), myopathy and peripheral neuropathy.

The FIAU is a clear example of direct drug-induced mitochondrial toxicity. Besides being incorporated into the viral DNA, FIAU is also incorporated into mitochondrial DNA. As FIAU is inserted into the growing chain of mitochondrial DNA replication. This leads to an inability of mitochondrial DNA polymerase γ to (further) replicate the DNA. There is a lack of DNA to provide ‘instructions’ to the mitochondria, resulting in reduction of mitochondrial respiration and the activity of mitochondrial respiratory complexes. The mitochondria no longer produce sufficient energy, causing lactic acid to form rapidly.

The acute liver failure is a direct result of this cascade. The liver is an energy-intensive organ and thus the failure of its cellular power plants will quickly lead to physical decay. But this damage is not limited to only the liver, as mitochondria are found all throughout the body. The end result will thus be multiple organ failure [10] and damage to the muscles and nerves in the arms and legs.

The animal trials done before the clinical trial had failed to predict this extreme species-selective toxicity. This is mainly due to that humans have the human equilibrate nucleoside transporter-1 (hENT-1) which will allow selective uptake of FIAU into the mitochondria in a way that other species do not.

== Pharmacology ==
=== Mechanism of action ===
Fialuridine (FIAU) is thymidine-like nucleoside analogue that was investigated as an antiviral against hepatitis B virus (HBV).

HBV replication depends on its viral polymerase, which acts as reverse transcriptase and makes viral DNA. Because FIAU-TP resembles the normal nucleotide TTP, the viral polymerase can use FIAU-TP as an alternative substrate during DNA synthesis. This disrupts replication in two related ways. Fist, FIAU-TP can directly inhibit hepatitis virus DNA polymerase activity (shown in the duck hepatitis B virus model). Second, FIAU-TP interferes with the early protein-priming stage of reverse transcription. In an in-vitro priming system, FIAU-TP caused premature termination of the short starter DNA, which prevents proper extension into full-length viral DNA.

Importantly, FIAU is not a classic obligate chain terminator, because it still has an intact 3’-OH group. However, once FIAU is incorporated into the growing DNA strand, extension becomes strongly slowed or blocked after a short step, so it behaves as a ‘de facto’ chain terminator. So FIAU's antiviral action can be summarized as follows: after FIAU is converted inside the cell into the active triphosphate form FIAU-TP, it can be used by the viral polymerase during BHV reverse transcription. This interaction disrupts the priming step and subsequent DNA chain synthesis, which eventually reduces the formation of complete viral DNA genomes. In cell-based HBV systems, FIAU also showed selective inhibitions of viral replication, suggesting that the mechanism is relevant for living cells.

=== Pharmacokinetics ===
Like many nucleoside analogues, FIAU is not active right away, it first needs to be converted inside liver cells to become active. In the liver FIAU is converted to its triphosphate form, which is the form that can be used by polymerases.

FIAU is the de-aminated product of fiacitabine (FIAC). Upon the entering of FIAC into the cell, cytosine nucleoside deaminase de-aminates FIAC to FIAU.

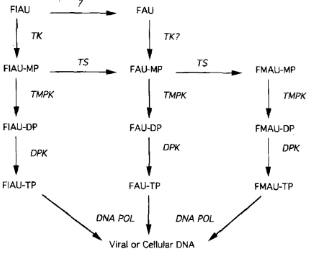
Figure 4: Metabolic activation and related pathways of fialuridine.

FIAU is then phosphorylated stepwise: thymidine kinase (TK) converts FIAU to FIAU-monophosphate (FIAU-MP), then thymidylate kinase (TMPK) forms FIAU-diphosphate (FIAU-DP) and finally nucleoside-diphosphate kinase (DPK) produces FIAU-triphosphate (FIAU-TP). FIAU-TP can be incorporated into viral or cellular DNA (figure 4).

In addition, thymidylate synthase (TS) has the potential to de-iodinate FIAU to FAU and then subsequently methylate FAU to FMAU monophosphate. FMAU monophosphate can subsequently be converted into FMAU diphosphate by thymidine monophosphate kinase (TMPK). Finally, FMAU diphosphate can be converted into FMAU triphosphate by the enzyme diphosphate kinase (DPK) with the purpose of incorporation into the viral or cellular DNA. FIAU does not exist as only one compound inside the cell, its metabolites can also contribute and FAU can ultimately be incorporated as FMAU in whole cells.

=== Mechanism of toxicity in humans ===
After FIAU is converted to FIAU-TP, it is not only available to viral polymerase, in humans it can also be taken up into mitochondria and used by mitochondrial DNA polymerase γ (POLG). When FIAU is incorporated into mitochondrial DNA (mtDNA), it disrupts mtDNA replication, which leads to mtDNA depletion. With less mtDNA, cells can make fewer proteins for the electron transport chain, so oxidative phosphorylation fails. The consequences are lactic acidosis (shift to anaerobic metabolism) and microvascular steatosis (impaired fatty-acid oxidation), especially in the liver

=== Toxicology data ===
In the 1990s, fialuridine (FIAU) was investigated in clinical trials. The first trial was a 10-day trial in which 43 patients, who were infected with HIV and hepatitis B, demonstrated effective antiviral activity. A subsequent second dose-ranging study was done on 24 patients with hepatitis B over a period of four weeks. The second trial showed significant viral suppression at intermediate doses. However, patients later relapsed, meaning that the viral infection had returned. A longer, 6-month NIH-sponsored, third trial was planned to be conducted, but severe toxicity emerged at patients who had participated in the second trial. Many severe and fatal adverse effects were reported, including lactic acidosis, acute liver failure, peripheral neuropathy, multiple organ failure, and mitochondrial toxicity. A 60-year-old patient died from liver failure and lactic acidosis four months after the second trial. During the third trial, many patients experienced unpleasant side effects such as nausea and vomiting to such an extent that the researchers decided to end the trial.

A theory put forward by Dr. Yung-Chi Chang of Yale University in 1991, which hypothesize that FIAU damaged the mitochondrial DNA, thereby giving rise to delayed toxicity. Urgent attempts were subsequently made to counteract the loss of mitochondria. However, by July 16, three patients had died, of whom two had already received a liver transplant and one was waiting for one. By August 1993, two more patients reported to be gravely ill and two other patients had also died. In conclusion, of the 15 patients who had completed treatment, 7 developed varying degrees of hepatic failure and lactic acidosis and 5 died. Investigations found that affected patients suffered depletion of mitochondrial DNA (mtDNA) in both liver and muscle tissue, establishing mitochondrial dysfunction as a contributing mechanism to the observed toxicity.

The FDA conducted a study into whether adverse effects could have been predicted beforehand. However, Dr. A Weinstein concluded that there was no way in which these adverse effects could have been predicted in laboratory animal studies or studies on patients.

== Chemistry ==
=== Structure ===
Fialuridine is a synthetic pyrimidine nucleoside analogue with the molecular formula C_{9}H_{10}FIN_{2}O_{5} and a molecular weight of 372.09 g/mol. Structurally, it consists of a substituted pyrimidine base covalently linked to a modified pentose sugar.

The base component is a 5-iodo-substituted pyrimidine-2,4-dione ring. The pyrimidine ring is aromatic, containing two carbonyl groups at positions 2 and 4. The uracil derivative also contains an iodine atom at position 5.

The attached sugar is a five-membered furanose ring that differs from natural deoxyribose in two ways: it has a fluorine atom at the second carbon (2-deoxy-2-fluoro substitution) and adopts the arabino configuration (fluor pointing up, 3’hydroxyl pointing down). The sugar ring is saturated and non-aromatic.

The modified base and sugar are connected via a β-N1 glycosidic bond between the anomeric carbon of the sugar and the N1 nitrogen of the pyrimidine ring. All these structural features correspond to similar pyrimidine analogues.

=== Reactivity ===
Fialuridine's functional groups all influence its chemical activity. The iodine substituent at the 5-position of the pyrimidine ring is a bulky halogen that can participate in metal-halogen exchange in the presence of an organolithium reagent to synthesize 5-substituted nucleosides The pyrimidine base's carbonyl groups are electrophilic and capable of participating in hydrogen bonding and condensation reactions. Fluorine substitution in the furanose ring increases local electronegativity and influences the stability of neighbouring bonds like the glycosidic linkage. The β-N1 glycosidic bond is generally stable but can undergo acid-catalysed hydrolysis under harsh conditions.

=== Synthesis ===
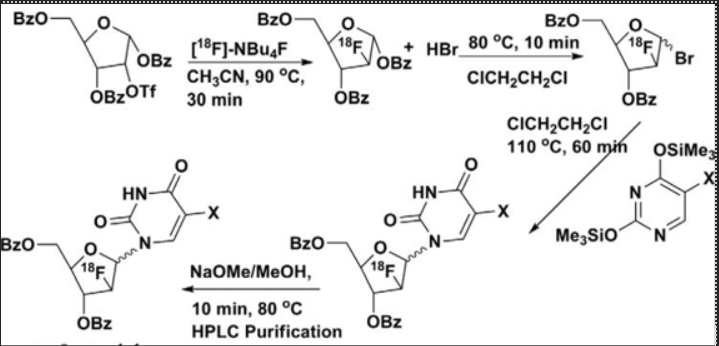
Figure 2: The synthesis of [F^{18}]-FIAU using TMSOTf-promoted glycosylation of a protected 2-deoxy-2-fluoro-D-arabinofuranose derivative with a silylated 5-iodouracil base, producing a mixture of α and β anomers in approximately a 1:1 ratio.

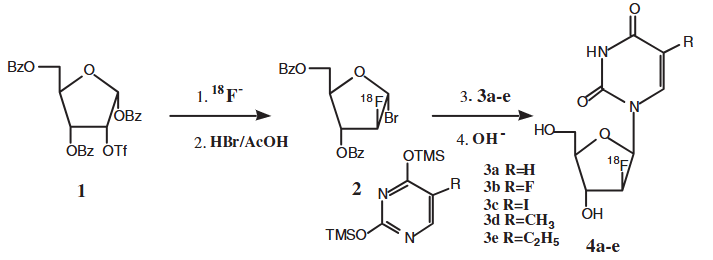
Figure 3: shows the synthesis of 2-deoxy-2-[F^{18}]fluoro-arabinofuranose uracil (a FIAU analogue) using a 1-bromo sugar intermediate and silylated uracil bases, which leads to improved selectivity for the β-anomer.

FIAU can be synthesized in many ways, with one of the recent ones following a glycosylation strategy typically used in nucleoside chemistry (Figure 2). The synthesis begins with a protected 2-deoxy-2-fluoro-1,3,5-tri-O-benzoyl-D-arabinofuranose to control reactivity at the anomeric carbon. The 5-iodouracil base is converted into a silylated form. Glycosylation is promoted using trimethylsilyl trifluoromethanesulfonate (TMSOTF), which activates the sugar derivative and enables formation of the glycosidic bond between the N1 nitrogen from the pyridine base and the anomeric carbon from the sugar. This procedure simplifies earlier synthetic steps but yields a 1:1 yield of both α and β anomers.

Other approaches have demonstrated improved β selectivity (Figure 3). Synthesis of closely related 2-deoxy-2-fluoro-β-D-arabinofuranosesyluracil derivatives employ pre-activated glycosyl donors (such as 1-bromo-2-fluoro sugar intermediates), which resulted in preferential formation of the β anomer in significantly higher proportions. This difference indicates that choice of glycosyl donor has a high influence on the α:β anomer ratio in FIAU, and related nucleoside analogues, synthesis.

Although the mentioned strategies involve radiolabelled fluorine-18, the overall synthetic approach is applicable to normal FIAU formation since isotopic substitution does not alter the bonding or reaction pathway.
