= Oxaloacetase =

Class of enzymes

Identifiers
- EC no.: 3.7.1.1
- CAS no.: 9024-89-9

Databases
- BRENDA: enzyme data
- ExPASy: NiceZyme view
- KEGG: enzyme entry
- MetaCyc: metabolic pathway
- Rhea: reactions
- PDB structures: RCSB PDB PDBe PDBsum
- Gene Ontology: AmiGO / QuickGO
Search
- PMC: articles
- PubMed: articles
- NCBI: proteins

Oxaloacetase (EC 3.7.1.1) is an enzyme characterised from Aspergillus niger that catalyzes the hydrolysis of oxaloacetic acid to oxalic acid and acetic acid:

oxaloacetic acid
H_{2}O
oxalic acid
+
acetic acid

The ultimate source of the oxalic acid is by the catabolism of glucose by a series of biochemical trnsformations.

This enzyme is a hydrolase, specifically one acting on carbon-carbon bonds in ketonic substances. The systematic name of this enzyme class is oxaloacetate acetylhydrolase. This enzyme is also called oxalacetic hydrolase.
