= Pyruvate carboxylase =

Enzyme

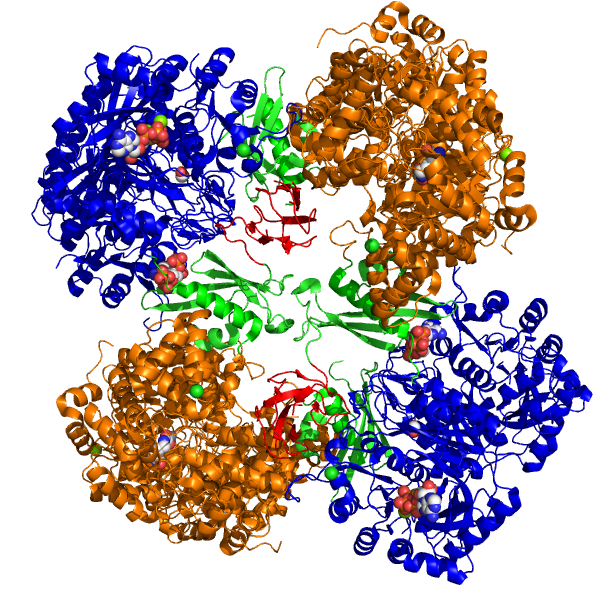
- Crystallographic structure of pyruvate carboxylase from Rhizobium etli: biotin carboxylase domain (blue); allosteric linking domain (green); biotin binding domain (red); and carboxyl transferase domain (orange)

Identifiers
- EC no.: 6.4.1.1
- CAS no.: 9014-19-1

Databases
- BRENDA: enzyme data
- ExPASy: NiceZyme view
- KEGG: enzyme entry
- MetaCyc: metabolic pathway
- Rhea: reactions
- PDB structures: RCSB PDB PDBe PDBsum
- Gene Ontology: AmiGO / QuickGO
Search
- PMC: articles
- PubMed: articles
- NCBI: proteins

Pyruvate carboxyltransferase

Identifiers
- Symbol: PYR_CT
- Pfam: PF00682
- InterPro: IPR000891
- PROSITE: PDOC50991
Available protein structures:
- PDB: IPR000891 PF00682 (ECOD; PDBsum)
- AlphaFold: IPR000891; PF00682

Pyruvate carboxylase

Identifiers
- Symbol: PC
- NCBI gene: 5091
- HGNC: 8636
- OMIM: 608786
- RefSeq: NM_000920
- UniProt: P11498

Other data
- EC number: 6.4.1.1
- Locus: Chr. 11 q11-q13.1
Search for
- Structures: Swiss-model
- Domains: InterPro

PC

Identifiers
- Aliases: PC, pyruvate carboxylase, PCB
- External IDs: OMIM: 608786; MGI: 97520; GeneCards: PC
Available structures
PDB	Ortholog search: PDBe RCSB
PDB	List of PDB id codes 3BG3, 3BG9
Enzyme activity
EC #	BRENDA	ExPASy	KEGG	MetaCyc
6.4.1.1	↗	↗	↗	↗

Gene location (Human)
Chr.	Chromosome 11 (human)
Band	11q13.2	Start	66,848,417 bp
Band	11q13.2	End	66,958,386 bp

Gene location (Mouse)
Chr.	Chromosome 19 (mouse)
Band	19 A|19 4.07 cM	Start	4,560,500 bp
Band	19 A|19 4.07 cM	End	4,671,780 bp
RNA expression pattern
Bgee	Human / Mouse (ortholog); Top expressed in: right lobe of liver; right frontal lobe; prefrontal cortex; caudate nucleus; right hemisphere of cerebellum; right adrenal gland; putamen; ganglionic eminence; nucleus accumbens; right adrenal cortex / Top expressed in: tunica adventitia of aorta; white adipose tissue; brown adipose tissue; right kidney; lactiferous gland; human kidney; subcutaneous adipose tissue; left lobe of liver; proximal tubule; adrenal gland; More reference expression data
BioGPS	n/a
Gene ontology
Molecular function	nucleotide binding; biotin binding; metal ion binding; pyruvate carboxylase activity; ligase activity; protein binding; catalytic activity; ATP binding; identical protein binding
Cellular component	cytoplasm; cytosol; mitochondrial matrix; mitochondrion
Biological process	gluconeogenesis; biotin metabolic process; lipid metabolism; negative regulation of gene expression; positive regulation by host of viral process; pyruvate metabolic process; viral RNA genome packaging; metabolism
Sources:Amigo / QuickGO
Orthologs
Databases	NCBI: entry; OMA: entry
Species	Human	Mouse
Entrez	5091	18563
Ensembl	ENSG00000173599	ENSMUSG00000024892
UniProt	P11498	Q05920
RefSeq (mRNA)	NM_000920; NM_001040716; NM_022172	NM_001162946; NM_008797
RefSeq (protein)	NP_000911; NP_001035806; NP_071504	n/a
Location (UCSC)	Chr 11: 66.85 – 66.96 Mb	Chr 19: 4.56 – 4.67 Mb
PubMed search
- Wikidata
View/Edit Human	View/Edit Mouse

Pyruvate carboxylase (PC) encoded by the gene PC is an enzyme (EC 6.4.1.1) of the ligase class that catalyzes (depending on the species) the physiologically irreversible carboxylation of pyruvate to form oxaloacetate (OAA).

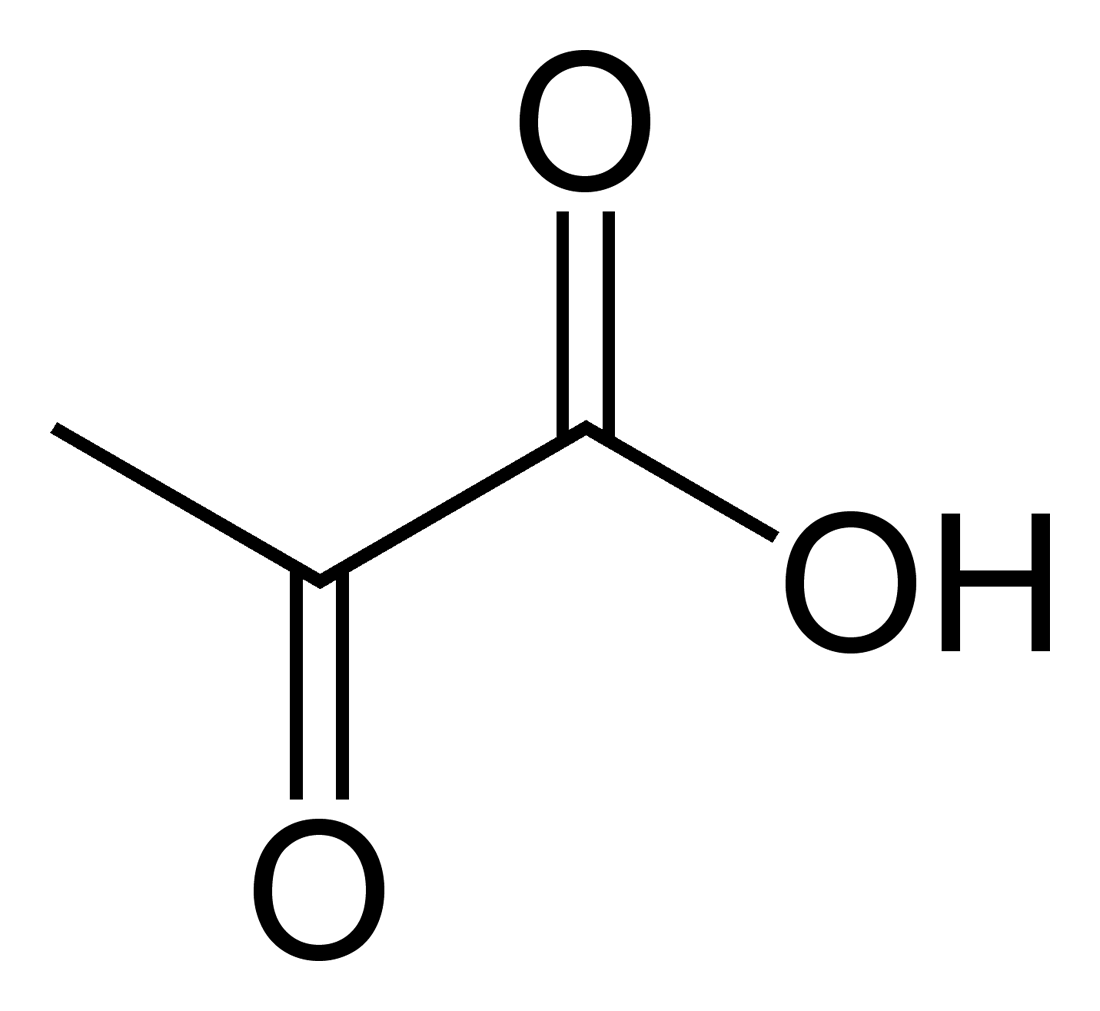
Pyruvic acid

Oxaloacetic acid

The reaction it catalyzes is:

pyruvate + HCO^{−}_{3} + ATP → oxaloacetate + ADP + P

It is an important anaplerotic reaction that creates oxaloacetate from pyruvate. PC contains a biotin prosthetic group and is typically localized to the mitochondria in eukaryotes with exceptions to some fungal species such as Aspergillus nidulans which have a cytosolic PC. PC requires magnesium and zinc or manganese for catalysis. PC from different organisms exhibit varying degrees of activation by acetyl-CoA, but vertebrate PC typically requires it for activity.

Pyruvate carboxylase was first discovered in 1959 at Case Western Reserve University by M. F. Utter and D. B. Keech. Since then it has been found in a wide variety of prokaryotes and eukaryotes including fungi, bacteria, and animals. In mammals, PC plays a crucial role in gluconeogenesis and lipogenesis, in the biosynthesis of neurotransmitters, and in glucose-induced insulin secretion by pancreatic islets. Oxaloacetate produced by PC is an important intermediate, which is used in these biosynthetic pathways. In mammals, PC is expressed in a tissue-specific manner, with its activity found to be highest in the liver and kidney (gluconeogenic tissues), in adipose tissue and lactating mammary gland (lipogenic tissues), and in pancreatic islets. Activity is moderate in brain, heart and adrenal gland, and least in white blood cells and skin fibroblasts.

== Structure ==
Structural studies of PC have been conducted by electron microscopy, by limited proteolysis, and by cloning and gasa sequencing of genes and cDNA encoding the enzyme. Most well characterized forms of active PC consist of four identical subunits arranged in a tetrahedron-like structure. Each subunit contains a single biotin moiety acting as a swinging arm to transport carbon dioxide to the catalytic site that is formed at the interface between adjacent monomers. Each subunit of the functional tetramer contains four domains: the biotin carboxylation (BC) domain, the transcarboxylation (CT) domain, the biotin carboxyl carrier (BCCP) domain and the recently termed PC tetramerization (PT) domain. From the two most complete crystal structures available, an asymmetric and symmetric form of the protein have been visualized. The Staphylococcus aureus tetramer in complex with the activator coenzyme A is highly symmetric, possessing 222 symmetry, and has been confirmed by cryo-EM studies. In contrast the Rhizobium etli, tetramer in complex with ethyl-CoA, a non-hydrolyzable analog of acetyl-CoA, possesses only one line of symmetry.

Pyruvate Carboxylase Symmetry Comparison

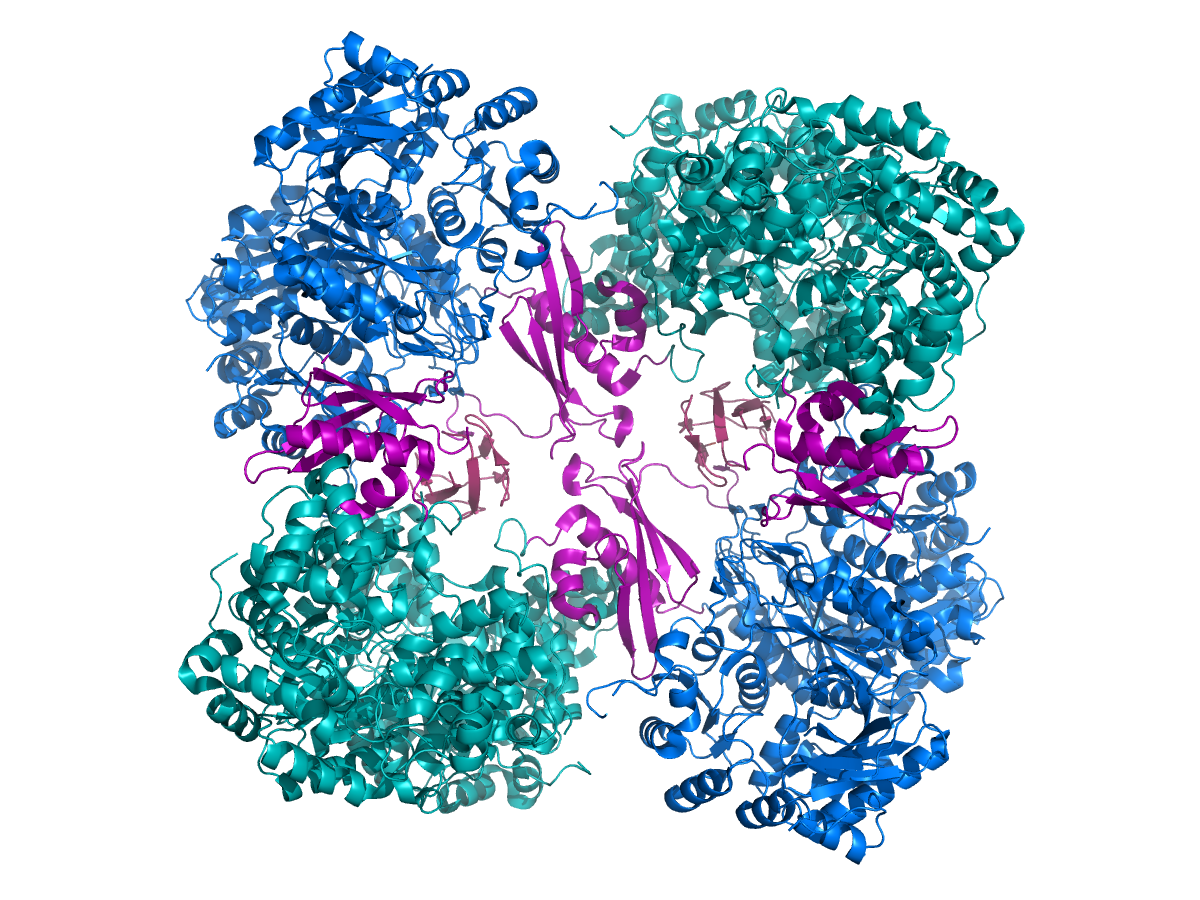
Rhizobium etli

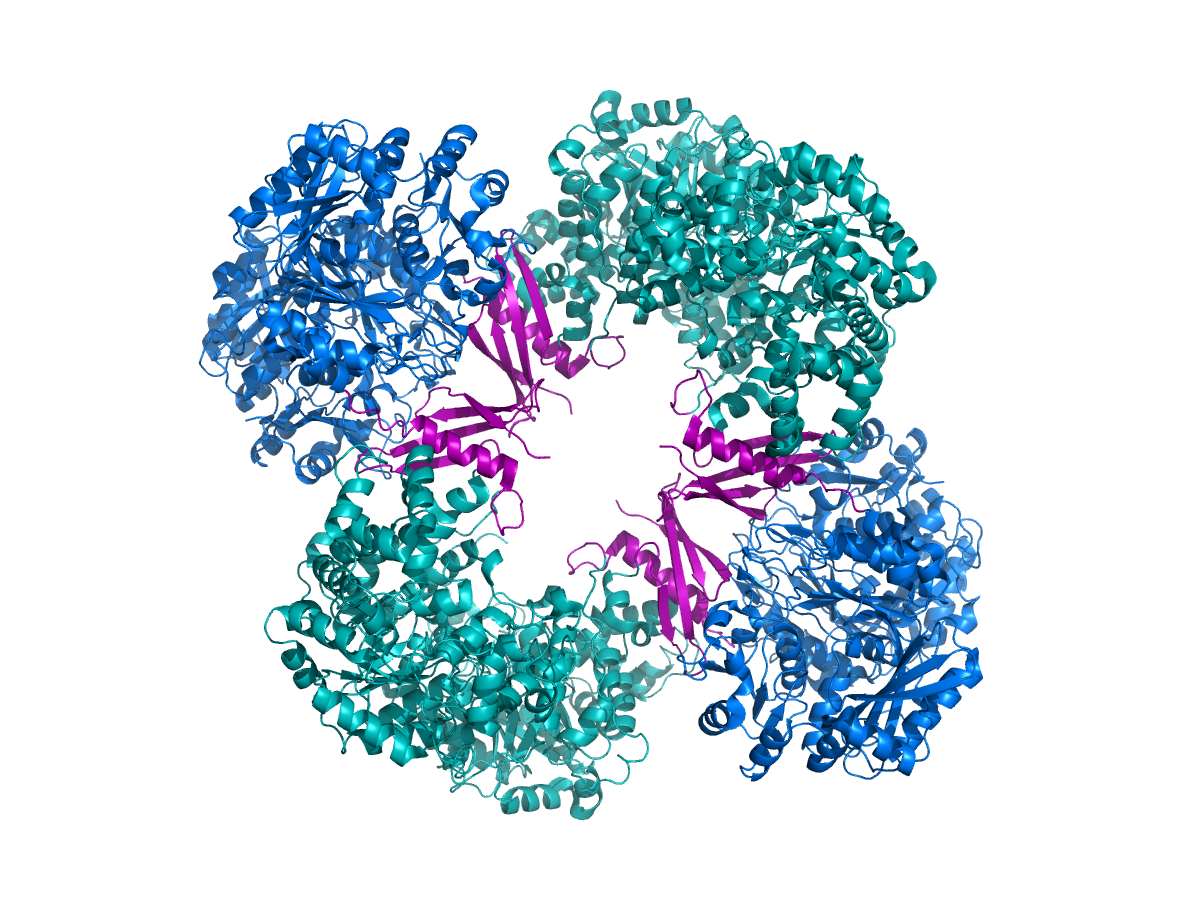
Staphylococcus aureus

Pyruvate carboxylase uses a covalently attached biotin cofactor which is used to catalyze the ATP– dependent carboxylation of pyruvate to oxaloacetate in two steps. Biotin is initially carboxylated at the BC active site by ATP and bicarbonate. The carboxyl group is subsequently transferred by carboxybiotin to a second active site in the CT domain, where pyruvate is carboxylated to generate oxaloacetate. The BCCP domain transfers the tethered cofactor between the two remote active sites. The allosteric binding site in PC offers a target for modifiers of activity that may be useful in the treatment of obesity or type II diabetes, and the mechanistic insights gained from the complete structural description of RePC (R. etli) permit detailed investigations into the individual catalytic and regulatory sites of the enzyme.

== Reaction mechanism ==
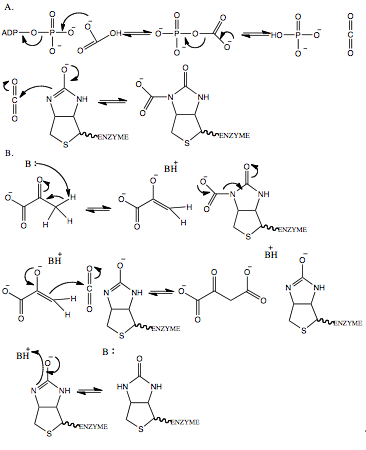
Proposed mechanism of pyruvate carboxylase: (A) ATP dependent carboxylation of biotin (BC domain); (B) Transcarboxylation of pyruvate (CT domain).

The reaction mechanism can be subdivided into two partial reactions (see figure to the right). In the first reaction, ATP is carboxylated to produce carbonic phosphoric anhydride [^{−}O(^{−}O)P(=O)O–C(=O)O^{−}] which in turn carboxylates a biotin cofactor that is covalently attached to a lysine residue of the BCCP domain. Carbonic phosphoric anhydride decomposes into carbon dioxide and phosphate prior to attack by the enzyme linked biotin molecule. In most species, this reaction requires acetyl-CoA as an allosteric activator binding to the PT domain. In the second reaction, occurring in the CT domain of an adjacent monomer, carbon dioxide is transferred to the acceptor molecule, pyruvate, to form oxaloacetate. The reaction proceeds via the removal of a proton from pyruvate, by an as yet unidentified active site residue, to generate an enolate intermediate. The enolate intermediate then attacks CO_{2} transiently released from the enzyme linked biotin molecule. The resultant oxaloacetate is released. The biotin molecule is protonated by the aforementioned active site residue and released from the active site of the CT domain to be recarboxylated. The major regulator of enzyme activity, acetyl-CoA, stimulates the cleavage of ATP in the first partial reaction and also it has been shown to induce a conformational change in the tetrameric structure of the enzyme.

== Function ==
During gluconeogenesis, pyruvate carboxylase is involved in the synthesis of phosphoenolpyruvate (PEP) from pyruvate. Pyruvate is first converted by pyruvate carboxylase to oxaloacetate (OAA) in the mitochondrion requiring hydrolysis of one molecule of ATP. The OAA is then decarboxylated and simultaneously phosphorylated, which is catalyzed by one of two isoforms of phosphoenolpyruvate carboxykinase (PEPCK) either in the cytosol or in the mitochondria to produce PEP. Under ordinary gluconeogenic conditions, OAA is converted into PEP by mitochondrial PEPCK; the resultant PEP is then transported out of the mitochondrial matrix by an anion transporter carrier system, and converted into glucose by cytosolic gluconeogenic enzymes. However, during starvation when cytosolic NADH concentration is low and mitochondrial NADH levels are high oxaloacetate can be used as a shuttle of reducing equivalents. As such OAA is converted into malate by mitochondrial malate dehydrogenase (MDH). After export into the cytosol, malate is converted back into OAA, with concomitant reduction of NAD^{+}; OAA is subsequently converted to PEP which is available for gluconeogenesis in the cytosol along with the transported reducing equivalent NADH.

Very high levels of PC activity, together with high activities of other gluconeogenic enzymes including PEPCK, fructose-1,6-bisphosphatase and glucose-6-phosphatase in liver and kidney cortex, suggest that a primary role of PC is to participate in gluconeogenesis in these organs. During fasting or starvation when endogenous glucose is required for certain tissues (brain, white blood cells and kidney medulla), expression of PC and other gluconeogenic enzymes is elevated. In rats and mice, alteration of nutrition status has been shown to affect hepatic PC activity. Fasting promotes hepatic glucose production sustained by an increased pyruvate flux, and increases in PC activity and protein concentration; diabetes similarly increases gluconeogenesis through enhanced uptake of substrate and increased flux through liver PC in mice and rats. Similarly to other gluconeogenic enzymes, PC is positively regulated by glucagon and glucocorticoids while negatively regulated by insulin. Further supporting the key role of PC in gluconeogenesis, in dairy cattle, which have hexose absorption ability at adequate nutrition levels, PC and the associated gluconeogenic enzyme PEPCK are markedly elevated during the transition to lactation in proposed support of lactose synthesis for milk production.

Aside from the role of PC in gluconeogenesis, PC serves an anaplerotic role (an enzyme catalyzed reaction that can replenish the supply of intermediates in a metabolic pathway) for the tricarboxylic acid cycle (essential to provide oxaloacetate), when intermediates are removed for different biosynthetic purposes.

Click on genes, proteins and metabolites below to link to respective articles. (Note: The interactive pathway map can be edited at WikiPathways: "GlycolysisGluconeogenesis_WP534".)

Glycolysis and Gluconeogenesis edit

=== Regulation ===
Pyruvate carboxylase is allosterically regulated by acetyl-CoA, Mg-ATP, and pyruvate.

== Clinical significance ==
As a crossroad between carbohydrate and lipid metabolism, pyruvate carboxylase expression in gluconeogenic tissues, adipose tissues and pancreatic islets must be coordinated. In conditions of over nutrition, PC levels are increased in pancreatic β-cells to increase pyruvate cycling in response to chronically elevated levels of glucose. In contrast, PC enzyme levels in the liver are decreased by insulin; during periods of overnutrition adipocyte tissue is expanded with extreme expression of PC and other lipogenic enzymes. Hepatic control of glucose levels is still regulated in an over nutrition situation, but in obesity induced type 2 diabetes the regulation of peripheral glucose levels is no longer under regulation of insulin. In type 2 diabetic rats, chronic exposure of β-cells to glucose due to peripheral insulin resistance results in decreased PC enzyme activity and decreased pyruvate cycling. The continued overproduction of glucose by hepatocytes causes dramatic alteration of gene expression in β-cells with large increases in normally suppressed genes, and equivalent decreases in expression of mRNA for insulin, ion pumps necessary for insulin secretion, and metabolic enzymes related to insulin secretion, including pyruvate carboxylase. Concurrently adipose tissue develops insulin resistance causing accumulation of triacylglycerols and non-esterified fatty acids in circulation; these not only further impairing β-cell function, but also further decreasing PC expression. These changes result in the decline of the β-cell phenotype in decompensated diabetes.

A deficiency of pyruvate carboxylase can cause lactic acidosis as a result of lactate build up. Normally, excess pyruvate is shunted into gluconeogenesis via conversion of pyruvate into oxaloacetate, but because of the enzyme deficiency, excess pyruvate is converted into lactate instead. As a key role of gluconeogenesis is in the maintenance of blood sugar, deficiency of pyruvate carboxylase can also lead to hypoglycemia.

== See also ==
- Pyruvate carboxylase deficiency
