= 3-Hydroxyvaleric acid =

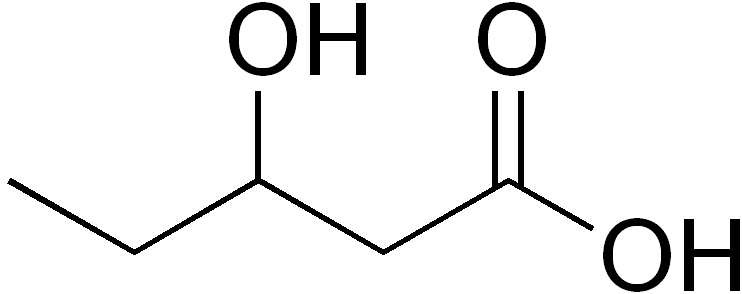

Names
- Preferred IUPAC name 3-Hydroxypentanoic acid
- Other names β-Hydroxyvaleric acid β-Hydroxypentanoic acid

Identifiers
CAS Number	10237-77-1
3D model (JSmol)	Interactive image; Interactive image
ChemSpider	96952
ECHA InfoCard	100.123.761
PubChem CID	107802
UNII	9D6K40J6UZ
CompTox Dashboard (EPA)	DTXSID00864240
- InChI: InChI=1S/C5H10O3/c1-2-4(6)3-5(7)8/h4,6H,2-3H2,1H3,(H,7,8) Key: REKYPYSUBKSCAT-UHFFFAOYSA-N; InChI=1/C5H10O3/c1-2-4(6)3-5(7)8/h4,6H,2-3H2,1H3,(H,7,8) Key: REKYPYSUBKSCAT-UHFFFAOYAT
- SMILES: CCC(CC(=O)O)O; O=C(O)CC(O)CC

Properties
Chemical formula	C_{5}H_{10}O_{3}
Molar mass	118.132 g·mol^{−1}
Solubility in water	784.8 g/L (estimated)
- Except where otherwise noted, data are given for materials in their standard state (at 25 °C [77 °F], 100 kPa). verify (what is ?) Infobox references

3-Hydroxyvaleric acid (3-hydroxypentanoic acid) is the organic compound with the formula CH_{3}CH_{2}CH(OH)CH_{2}CO_{2}H. It is one of the hydroxypentanoic acids. It is made from odd carbon fatty acids in the liver and rapidly enters the brain. As opposed to 4-carbon ketone bodies, 3-hydroxyvaleric acid is anaplerotic, meaning it can refill the pool of TCA cycle intermediates. The triglyceride triheptanoin is used clinically to produce 3-hydroxyvalerate (the carboxylate form).

== Properties ==
- Solubility in water: 784.8 g/L at 25 °C (estimated)
