= Hydroxyvaleric acid =

Hydroxyvaleric acid or hydroxypentanoic acid may refer to the following compounds:

- α-Hydroxyvaleric acid (2-hydroxyvaleric acid)
- β-Hydroxyvaleric acid (3-hydroxyvaleric acid)
- γ-Hydroxyvaleric acid (4-hydroxyvaleric acid)
- ω-Hydroxyvaleric acid (5-hydroxyvaleric acid), a ω-hydroxy acid

The carboxylate of the acid is hydroxyvalerate or hydroxypentanoate

== See also ==
- β-Hydroxyisovaleric acid
