= Oxaloacetate tautomerase =

Enzyme

oxaloacetate tautomerase

Identifiers
- EC no.: 5.3.2.2
- CAS no.: 37318-45-9

Databases
- IntEnz: IntEnz view
- BRENDA: BRENDA entry
- ExPASy: NiceZyme view
- KEGG: KEGG entry
- MetaCyc: metabolic pathway
- PRIAM: profile
- PDB structures: RCSB PDB PDBe PDBsum
- Gene Ontology: AmiGO / QuickGO
Search
- PMC: articles
- PubMed: articles
- NCBI: proteins

In enzymology, an oxaloacetate tautomerase (EC 5.3.2.2) is an enzyme that catalyzes the chemical reaction

keto-oxaloacetate $\rightleftharpoons$ enol-oxaloacetate

Hence, this enzyme has one substrate, keto-oxaloacetate, and one product, enol-oxaloacetate.

This enzyme belongs to the family of isomerases, specifically those intramolecular oxidoreductases interconverting keto- and enol-groups. The systematic name of this enzyme class is oxaloacetate keto---enol-isomerase. This enzyme is also called oxaloacetic keto-enol isomerase.

While oxaloacetate tautomerase was characterized in several papers in the 1960s and 1970s, this activity has not been correlated with any gene identified in the genome of higher organisms.
