= Roche ester =

- (R)- and (S)-enantiomers of Roche ester

Names
- Preferred IUPAC name Methyl 3-hydroxy-2-methylpropanoate

Identifiers
CAS Number	72657-23-9 (R); 80657-57-4 (S)
3D model (JSmol)	(R): Interactive image; (S): Interactive image
ChemSpider	4482250 (R); 8368063 (S)
ECHA InfoCard	100.250.015
PubChem CID	5324733 (R); 10192563 (S)
UNII	569FQ3X7KG
CompTox Dashboard (EPA)	DTXSID90993497
- InChI: (R): InChI=1S/C5H10O3/c1-4(3-6)5(7)8-2/h4,6H,3H2,1-2H3/t4-/m1/s1 Key: ATCCIZURPPEVIZ-SCSAIBSYSA-N; (S): InChI=1S/C5H10O3/c1-4(3-6)5(7)8-2/h4,6H,3H2,1-2H3/t4-/m0/s1 Key: ATCCIZURPPEVIZ-BYPYZUCNSA-N
- SMILES: (R): C[C@H](CO)C(=O)OC; (S): C[C@@H](CO)C(=O)OC

Properties
Chemical formula	C_{5}H_{10}O_{3}
Molar mass	118.13 gmol^{−1}
Density	1.071 g/mL
Boiling point	74 °C (165 °F; 347 K) at 10 mmHg

Hazards
Flash point	80 °C (176 °F; 353 K)
- Except where otherwise noted, data are given for materials in their standard state (at 25 °C [77 °F], 100 kPa). Infobox references

Roche ester (methyl 3-hydroxy-2-methylpropionate) is a chemical compound with formula C_{5}H_{10}O_{3}. It can exist as two enantiomers. Both are commercially available and have been widely used as starting blocks for the synthesis of many targets including dictyostatin, discodermolide and spongidepsin.
