= Zymonic acid =

Names
- IUPAC name 4-hydroxy-2-methyl-5-oxofuran-2-carboxylic acid
- Other names: 2,5-Dihydro-4-hydroxy-2-methyl-5-oxo-2-furancarboxylic acid; 4-hydroxy-2-methyl-5-oxo-2,5-dihydrofuran-2-carboxylic acid

Identifiers
CAS Number	24891-71-2
3D model (JSmol)	Interactive image
ChEBI	CHEBI:172309
ChemSpider	35013332
PubChem CID	71436380
CompTox Dashboard (EPA)	DTXSID701187301
- InChI: InChI=1S/C6H6O5/c1-6(5(9)10)2-3(7)4(8)11-6/h2,7H,1H3,(H,9,10) Key: FMOWGHRAYUFXIG-UHFFFAOYSA-N
- SMILES: CC1(C=C(C(=O)O1)O)C(=O)O

Properties
Chemical formula	C_{6}H_{6}O_{5}
Molar mass	158.109 g·mol^{−1}
Appearance	white solid
Density	1.523 g/cm^{3}
- Except where otherwise noted, data are given for materials in their standard state (at 25 °C [77 °F], 100 kPa). Infobox references

Zymonic acid is an organic compound with the empirical formula C_{6}H_{6}O_{5}. It is the product of the condensation of two molecules of pyruvic acid:

2 CH_{3}C(O)CO_{2}H → (O=C)(HOC)(HC)OC(CH_{3})(CO_{2}H) + H_{2}O

The molecule is an unsaturated furanone, as established by X-ray crystallography. In aqueous solution, zymonic acid reversibly converts to a variety of derivatives including ring-opened and cyclic hydrates.
