= Pyruvic acid =

Simplest of the alpha-keto acids

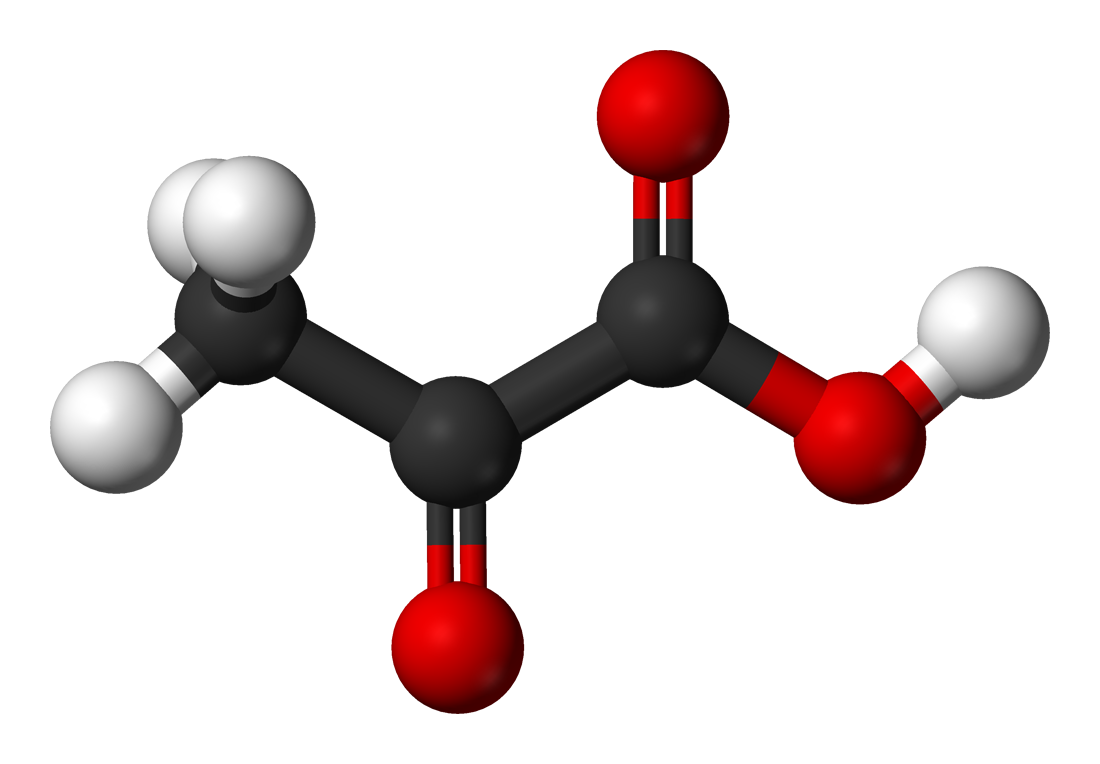

Names
- Preferred IUPAC name 2-Oxopropanoic acid
- Systematic IUPAC name 2-Oxopropanoic acid
- Other names 2-Oxopropionic acid Pyruvic acid α-Ketopropionic acid Acetylformic acid Pyroracemic acid Acetylcarboxylic acid

Identifiers
CAS Number	127-17-3
3D model (JSmol)	Interactive image
Abbreviations	Pyr
ChEBI	CHEBI:32816
ChEMBL	ChEMBL1162144
ChemSpider	1031
DrugBank	DB00119
ECHA InfoCard	100.004.387
IUPHAR/BPS	4809
KEGG	C00022
PubChem CID	1060
UNII	8558G7RUTR
CompTox Dashboard (EPA)	DTXSID2021650
- InChI: InChI=1S/C3H4O3/c1-2(4)3(5)6/h1H3,(H,5,6) Key: LCTONWCANYUPML-UHFFFAOYSA-N
- SMILES: O=C(C(=O)O)C

Properties
Chemical formula	C_{3}H_{4}O_{3}
Molar mass	88.06 g/mol
Density	1.250 g/cm^{3}
Melting point	11.8 °C (53.2 °F; 284.9 K)
Boiling point	165 °C (329 °F; 438 K)
Acidity (pK_{a})	2.50

Related compounds
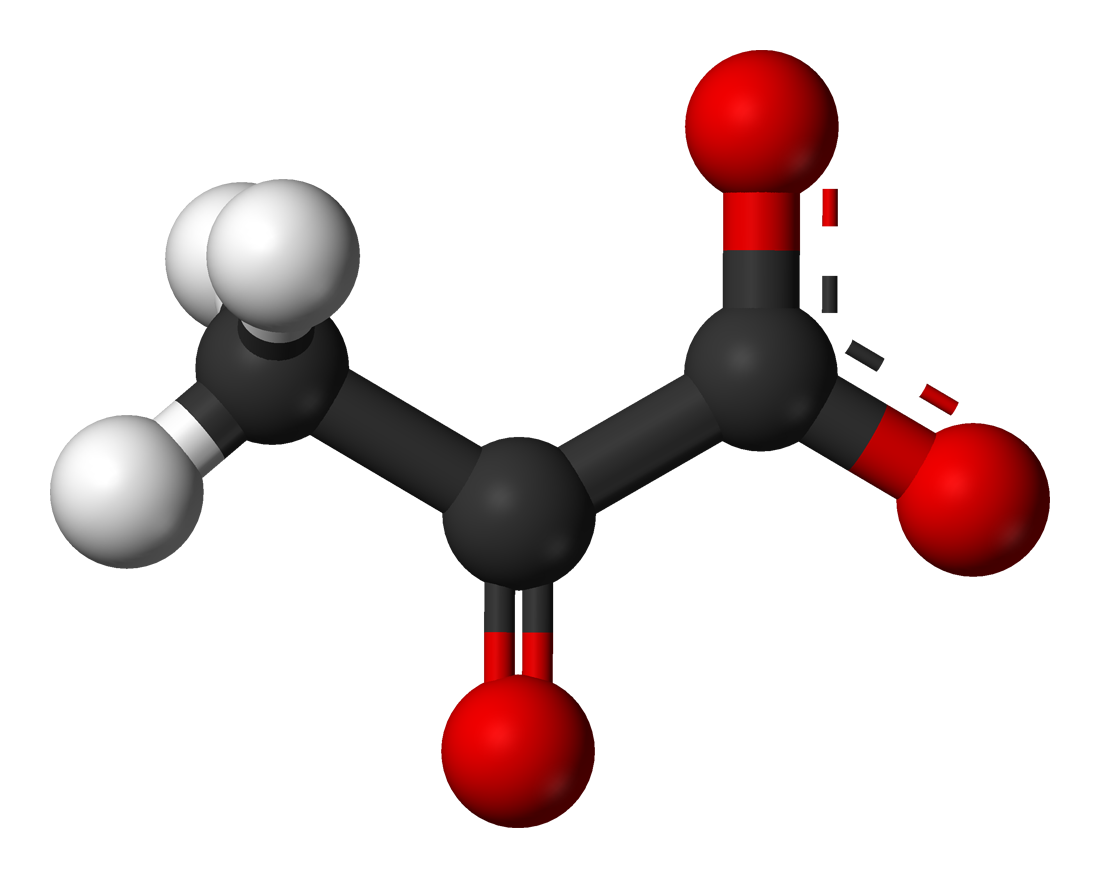
Other anions	Pyruvate
Related keto-acids, carboxylic acids	Acetic acid; Glyoxylic acid; Oxalic acid; Propionic acid; Acetoacetic acid
Related compounds	Propionaldehyde; Glyceraldehyde; Methylglyoxal; Sodium pyruvate
- Except where otherwise noted, data are given for materials in their standard state (at 25 °C [77 °F], 100 kPa). verify (what is ?) Infobox references

Pyruvic acid (CH_{3}COCOOH or CH_{3}COCO_{2}H) is the simplest of the alpha-keto acids, with a carboxylic acid and a ketone functional group. Pyruvate (CH_{3}COCOO^{−} or CH_{3}COCO_{2}^{−}), the conjugate base, is an intermediate in several metabolic pathways throughout the cell.

Pyruvic acid can be made from glucose through glycolysis, converted back to carbohydrates (such as glucose) via gluconeogenesis, or converted to fatty acids through a reaction via acetyl-CoA. It can also be used to construct the amino acid alanine and can be converted into ethanol or lactic acid via fermentation.

Pyruvic acid supplies energy to cells through the citric acid cycle (also known as the Krebs cycle) when oxygen is present (aerobic respiration). Alternatively, it can ferment to produce lactate in the absence of oxygen.

== History ==
In 1834, Théophile-Jules Pelouze distilled tartaric acid and isolated glutaric acid and another unknown organic acid. Jöns Jacob Berzelius characterized this other acid the following year and named pyruvic acid because it was distilled using heat. The correct molecular structure was deduced by the 1870s.

== Production ==
Pyruvic acid is prepared by treating tartaric acid with acid. It can also be produced by oxidation of propylene glycol by potassium permanganate or bleach. The hydrolysis of acetyl cyanide, formed by reaction of acetyl chloride with potassium cyanide, represents yet another route:

CH_{3}COCN + 2 H_{2}O → CH_{3}COCOOH + NH_{3}

== Structure ==
Pyruvic acid crystallizes as the keto acid, not the enol. The six non-hydrogen atoms are nearly coplanar. More relevant to biochemistry is the structure of the pyruvate anion. Several salts of pyruvate have been examined by X-ray crystallography. These tests confirm that pyruvate anion also exists in the keto form.

== Reactivity ==
As a simple, abundant and bifunctional compound, pyruvic acid has been shown to participate in many reactions. Pyruvate reacts with amino acids to give alanine by the process called transamination:

CH_{3}C(O)CO_{2}^{−} + RCH_{2}NH_{2} → CH_{3}CH(NH_{2})CO_{2}^{−} + RCHO

Pyruvic acid self-condenses to give zymonic acid, a cyclic dehydrated dimer:

2 CH_{3}C(O)CO_{2}H → (O=C)(HOC)(HC)C(CH_{3})(CO_{2}H) + H_{2}O

The dehydration can be induced by distillation of pyruvic acid. Zymonic acid in turn forms a variety of derivatives in aqueous solution.

Pyruvic acid is a precursor to several types of heterocycles. When treated with phenethylamine, it gives tetrahydroisoquinoline by a sequential condensation/acylation process (Bischler–Napieralski reaction). With ortho-phenylenediamine it condenses to give quinoxalines. Condensation with 4,5-diaminopyrimidine give hydroxypteridines.

== Biochemistry ==
Pyruvate is important in biochemistry. It is the output of the metabolism of glucose known as glycolysis. One molecule of glucose breaks down into two molecules of pyruvate, which are then used to provide further energy, in one of two ways. Pyruvate is converted into acetyl-coenzyme A, which is the main input for a series of reactions known as the Krebs cycle (also known as the citric acid cycle or tricarboxylic acid cycle). Pyruvate is also converted to oxaloacetate by an anaplerotic reaction, which replenishes Krebs cycle intermediates; also, the oxaloacetate is used for gluconeogenesis.

These reactions are named after Hans Adolf Krebs, the biochemist awarded the 1953 Nobel Prize for physiology, jointly with Fritz Lipmann, for research into metabolic processes. The cycle is also known as the citric acid cycle or tricarboxylic acid cycle, because citric acid is one of the intermediate compounds formed during the reactions.

If insufficient oxygen is available, the acid is broken down anaerobically, creating lactate in animals and ethanol in plants and microorganisms (and in carp). Pyruvate from glycolysis is converted by fermentation to lactate using the enzyme lactate dehydrogenase and the coenzyme NADH in lactate fermentation, or to acetaldehyde (with the enzyme pyruvate decarboxylase) and then to ethanol in alcoholic fermentation.

Pyruvate is a key intersection in the network of metabolic pathways. Pyruvate can be converted into carbohydrates via gluconeogenesis, to fatty acids or energy through acetyl-CoA, to the amino acid alanine, and to ethanol. Therefore, it unites several key metabolic processes.

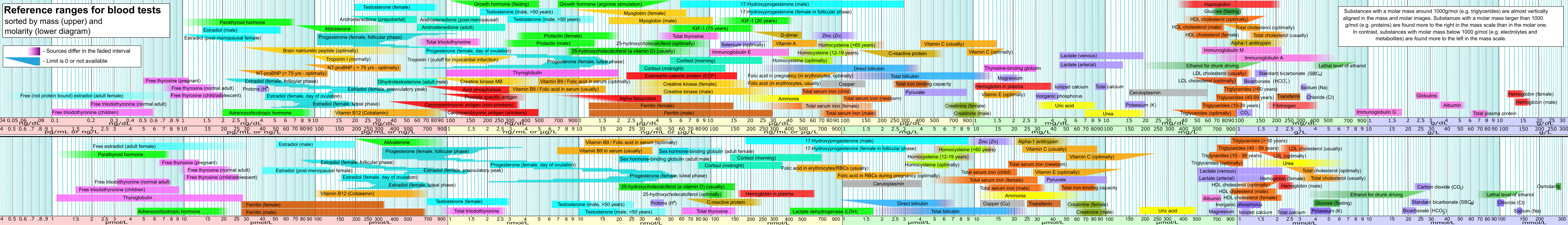
Reference ranges for blood tests, comparing blood content of pyruvate (shown in violet near middle) with other constituents.

=== Pyruvic acid production by glycolysis ===
In the last step of glycolysis, phosphoenolpyruvate (PEP) is converted to pyruvate by pyruvate kinase. This reaction is strongly exergonic and metabolically irreversible; in gluconeogenesis, it takes two enzymes, pyruvate carboxylase and PEP carboxykinase, to catalyze the reverse transformation of pyruvate to PEP.

phosphoenolpyruvate	pyruvate kinase		pyruvic acid
	ADP	ATP
	ADP	ATP
	pyruvate carboxylase and PEP carboxykinase

Compound C00074 at KEGG Pathway Database. Enzyme 2.7.1.40 at KEGG Pathway Database. Compound C00022 at KEGG Pathway Database.

Click on genes, proteins and metabolites below to link to respective articles. (Note: The interactive pathway map can be edited at WikiPathways: "GlycolysisGluconeogenesis_WP534".)

Glycolysis and Gluconeogenesis edit

=== Decarboxylation to acetyl CoA ===
Pyruvate decarboxylation by the pyruvate dehydrogenase complex produces acetyl-CoA.

pyruvate	pyruvate dehydrogenase complex		acetyl-CoA
	CoA + NAD^{+}	CO_{2} + NADH + H^{+}

=== Carboxylation to oxaloacetate ===
Carboxylation by pyruvate carboxylase produces oxaloacetate.

pyruvate	pyruvate carboxylase		oxaloacetate
	ATP + CO_{2}	ADP + P_{i}

=== Transamination to alanine ===
Transamination by alanine transaminase produces alanine.

pyruvate	alanine transaminase		alanine
	glutamate	α-ketoglutarate
	glutamate	α-ketoglutarate

=== Reduction to lactate ===
Reduction by lactate dehydrogenase produces lactate.

pyruvate	lactate dehydrogenase		lactate
	NADH	NAD^{+}
	NADH	NAD^{+}

=== Environmental chemistry ===
Pyruvic acid is an abundant carboxylic acid in secondary organic aerosols.

== Uses ==
Aside from its major role in the functioning of living organisms, pyruvic acid is of interest as a reagent in the synthesis of specialized organic compounds as discussed above in the reactivity section.

== See also ==
- Pyruvate scale
- Uvitonic acid
