= Frank Woods (pharmacologist) =

British pharmacologist (1937-2016)

Professor Frank Woods CBE, FRCP, FRCPE, FFPM, FMedSci
- Born: Hubert Frank Woods; 1937
- Died: January 2016 (aged 78–79)
- Occupation: Pharmacologist
- Employer: University of Sheffield
- Known for: Clinical and Biochemical Aspects of Lactic Acidosis (1976); Cohen-Woods classification

Professor Hubert Frank Woods CBE, FRCP, FRCPE, FFPM, FMedSci (1937-2016), known as Frank, was a British pharmacologist.

He was appointed professor of pharmacology and therapeutics at the University of Sheffield in 1976. In 1989 he became Sir George Franklin professor of medicine and was made the University's director of the division of clinical sciences (south). He was dean of the faculty of medicine there from 1988 to 1998.

He served as chair of the General Medical Council's Health Committee, and sat on the Committee on Toxicity of Chemicals in Food, Consumer Products and the Environment, and was made a Commander of the Order of the British Empire (CBE) in the 2001 Birthday Honours, for services to the latter.

He was elected a Fellow of the Academy of Medical Sciences in 1998, a Fellow of the Royal College of Physicians, a Fellow of the Royal College of Physicians of Edinburgh, and a Fellow of the Faculty of Pharmaceutical Medicine.

He died in January 2016.
