= Oxaloacetic acid =

Organic compound

- Skeletal structure

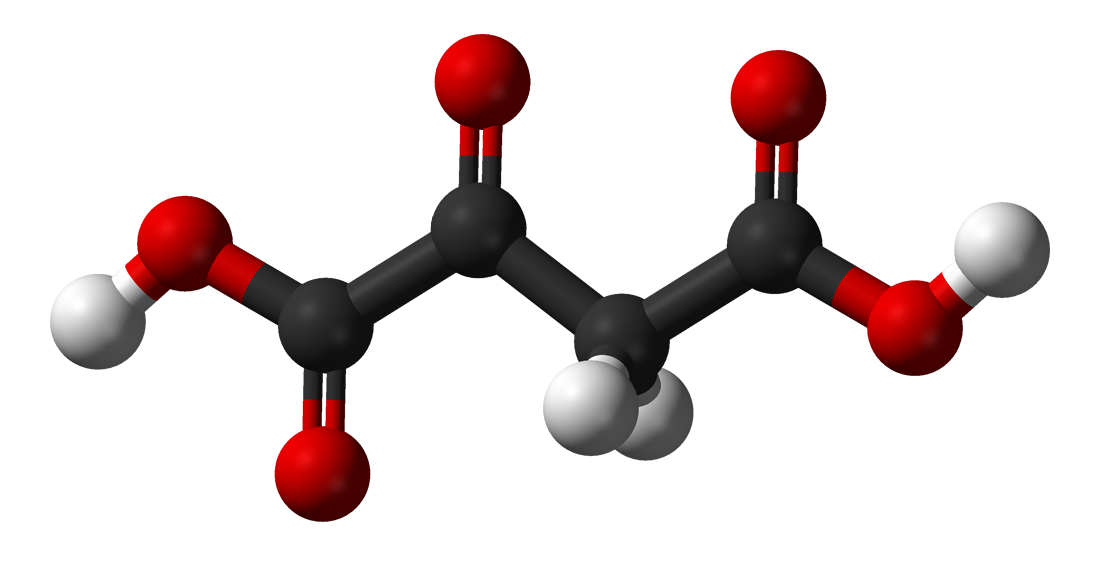
- Ball-and-stick model

Names
- Preferred IUPAC name 2-Oxobutanedioic acid
- Other names Oxaloacetic acid Oxalacetic acid 2-Oxosuccinic acid Ketosuccinic acid

Identifiers
CAS Number	328-42-7
3D model (JSmol)	Interactive image
ChEBI	CHEBI:30744
ChemSpider	945
ECHA InfoCard	100.005.755
EC Number	206-329-8
IUPHAR/BPS	5236
KEGG	C00036
PubChem CID	970
UNII	2F399MM81J
CompTox Dashboard (EPA)	DTXSID8021646
- InChI: InChI=1S/C4H4O5/c5-2(4(8)9)1-3(6)7/h1H2,(H,6,7)(H,8,9) Key: KHPXUQMNIQBQEV-UHFFFAOYSA-N
- SMILES: O=C(O)C(=O)CC(=O)O

Properties
Chemical formula	C_{4}H_{4}O_{5}
Molar mass	132.07 g/mol
Density	1.6 g/cm^{3}
Melting point	161 °C (322 °F; 434 K)

Thermochemistry
Std enthalpy of formation (Δ_{f}H^{⦵}_{298})	−943.21 kJ/mol
Std enthalpy of combustion (Δ_{c}H^{⦵}_{298})	−1205.58 kJ/mol
- Except where otherwise noted, data are given for materials in their standard state (at 25 °C [77 °F], 100 kPa). verify (what is ?) Infobox references

Oxaloacetic acid (also known as oxalacetic acid or OAA) is a crystalline organic compound with the chemical formula HO_{2}CC(O)CH_{2}CO_{2}H. Oxaloacetic acid, in the form of its conjugate base oxaloacetate, is a metabolic intermediate in many processes that occur in animals. It takes part in gluconeogenesis, the urea cycle, the glyoxylate cycle, amino acid synthesis, fatty acid synthesis and the citric acid cycle.

== Properties ==
Oxaloacetic acid undergoes successive deprotonations to give the dianion:

HO_{2}CC(O)CH_{2}CO_{2}H ⇌ ^{−}O_{2}CC(O)CH_{2}CO_{2}H + H^{+}, pK_{a} = 2.22
^{−}O_{2}CC(O)CH_{2}CO_{2}H ⇌ ^{−}O_{2}CC(O)CH_{2}CO_{2}^{−} + H^{+}, pK_{a} = 3.89

At high pH, the enolizable proton is ionized:

^{−}O_{2}CC(O)CH_{2}CO_{2}^{−} ⇌ ^{−}O_{2}CC(O^{−})CHCO_{2}^{−} + H^{+}, pK_{a} = 13.03

The enol forms of oxaloacetic acid are particularly stable. Keto-enol tautomerization is catalyzed by the enzyme oxaloacetate tautomerase. trans-Enol-oxaloacetate also appears when tartrate is the substrate for fumarase.

Oxaloacetate tautomerase catalyzed creation of enol-oxaloacetate. (Z) isoform is shown.

== Biosynthesis ==
Oxaloacetate forms in several ways in nature. A principal route is upon oxidation of L-malate, catalyzed by malate dehydrogenase, in the citric acid cycle. Malate is also oxidized by succinate dehydrogenase in a slow reaction with the initial product being enol-oxaloacetate.
It also arises from the condensation of pyruvate with carbonic acid, driven by the hydrolysis of ATP:

CH_{3}C(O)CO_{2}^{−} + HCO_{3}^{−} + ATP → ^{−}O_{2}CCH_{2}C(O)CO_{2}^{−} + ADP + Pi

Occurring in the mesophyll of plants, this process proceeds via phosphoenolpyruvate, catalysed by phosphoenolpyruvate carboxylase.
Oxaloacetate can also arise from trans- or de- amination of aspartic acid.

== Biochemical functions ==
Oxaloacetate is an intermediate of the citric acid cycle, where it reacts with acetyl-CoA to form citrate, catalyzed by citrate synthase. It is also involved in gluconeogenesis, the urea cycle, the glyoxylate cycle, amino acid synthesis, and fatty acid synthesis. Oxaloacetate is also a potent inhibitor of complex II.

=== Gluconeogenesis ===
Gluconeogenesis is a metabolic pathway consisting of a series of eleven enzyme-catalyzed reactions, resulting in the generation of glucose from non-carbohydrate substrates. The beginning of this process takes place in the mitochondrial matrix, where pyruvate molecules are found. A pyruvate molecule is carboxylated by a pyruvate carboxylase enzyme, activated by a molecule each of ATP and water. This reaction results in the formation of oxaloacetate. NADH reduces oxaloacetate to malate. This transformation is needed to transport the molecule out of the mitochondria. Once in the cytosol, malate is oxidized to oxaloacetate again using NAD+. Then oxaloacetate remains in the cytosol, where the rest of reactions will take place. Oxaloacetate is later decarboxylated and phosphorylated by phosphoenolpyruvate carboxykinase and becomes 2-phosphoenolpyruvate using guanosine triphosphate (GTP) as phosphate source. Glucose is obtained after further downstream processing.

=== Urea cycle ===
The urea cycle is a metabolic pathway that results in the formation of urea using one ammonium molecule from degraded amino acids, another ammonium group from aspartate and one bicarbonate molecule. This route commonly occurs in hepatocytes. The reactions related to the urea cycle produce NADH, and NADH can be produced in two different ways. One of these uses oxaloacetate. In the cytosol there are fumarate molecules. Fumarate can be transformed into malate by the actions of the enzyme fumarase. Malate is acted on by malate dehydrogenase to become oxaloacetate, producing a molecule of NADH. After that, oxaloacetate will be recycled to aspartate, as transaminases prefer these keto acids over the others. This recycling maintains the flow of nitrogen into the cell.

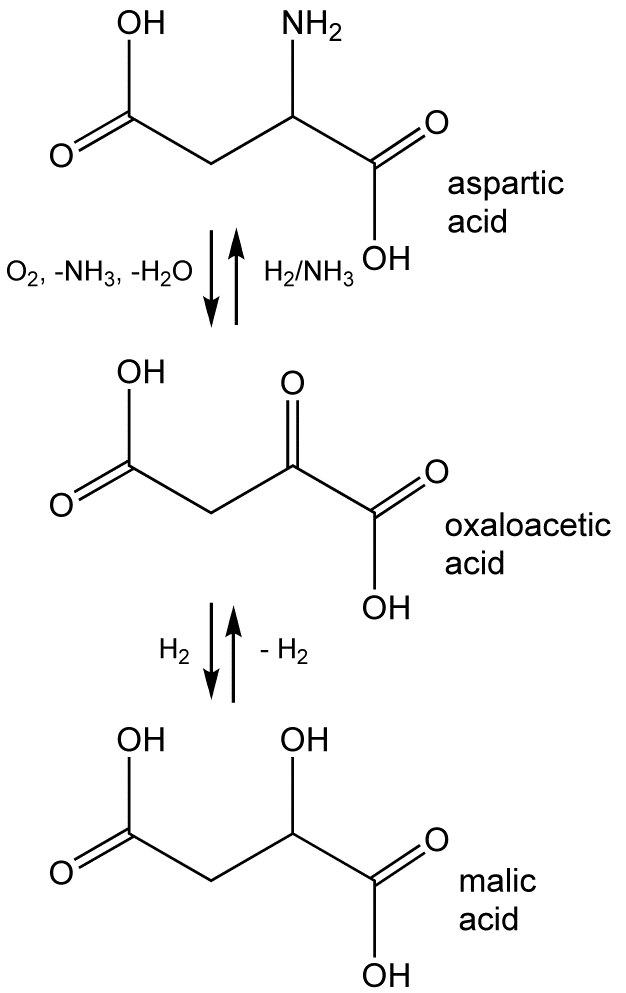
Relationship of oxaloacetic acid, malic acid, and aspartic acid

=== Glyoxylate cycle ===
The glyoxylate cycle is a variant of the citric acid cycle. It is an anabolic pathway occurring in plants and bacteria utilizing the enzymes isocitrate lyase and malate synthase. Some intermediate steps of the cycle are slightly different from the citric acid cycle; nevertheless oxaloacetate has the same function in both processes. This means that oxaloacetate in this cycle also acts as the primary reactant and final product. In fact the oxaloacetate is a net product of the glyoxylate cycle because its loop of the cycle incorporates two molecules of acetyl-CoA.

=== Fatty acid synthesis ===
In previous stages acetyl-CoA is transferred from the mitochondria to the cytoplasm where fatty acid synthase resides. The acetyl-CoA is transported as a citrate, which has been previously formed in the mitochondrial matrix from acetyl-CoA and oxaloacetate. This reaction usually initiates the citric acid cycle, but when there is no need of energy it is transported to the cytoplasm where it is broken down to cytoplasmic acetyl-CoA and oxaloacetate.

Another part of the cycle requires NADPH for the synthesis of fatty acids. Part of this reducing power is generated when the cytosolic oxaloacetate is returned to the mitochondria as long as the internal mitochondrial layer is non-permeable for oxaloacetate. Firstly the oxaloacetate is reduced to malate using NADH. Then the malate is decarboxylated to pyruvate. Now this pyruvate can easily enter the mitochondria, where it is carboxylated again to oxaloacetate by pyruvate carboxylase. In this way, the transfer of acetyl-CoA that is from the mitochondria into the cytoplasm produces a molecule of NADH. The overall reaction, which is spontaneous, may be summarized as:

HCO_{3}^{–} + ATP + acetyl-CoA → ADP + P_{i} + malonyl-CoA

=== Amino acid synthesis ===
Six essential amino acids and three nonessential are synthesized from oxaloacetate and pyruvate. Aspartate and alanine are formed from oxaloacetate and pyruvate, respectively, by transamination from glutamate. Asparagine is synthesized by amidation of aspartate, with glutamine donating the NH4. These are nonessential amino acids, and their simple biosynthetic pathways occur in all organisms. Methionine, threonine, lysine, isoleucine, valine, and leucine are essential amino acids in humans and most vertebrates, meaning that oxaloacetate cannot be converted into any of these aminos. However they can be synthesizers in bacteria via biosynthetic pathways that are complex and interconnected.

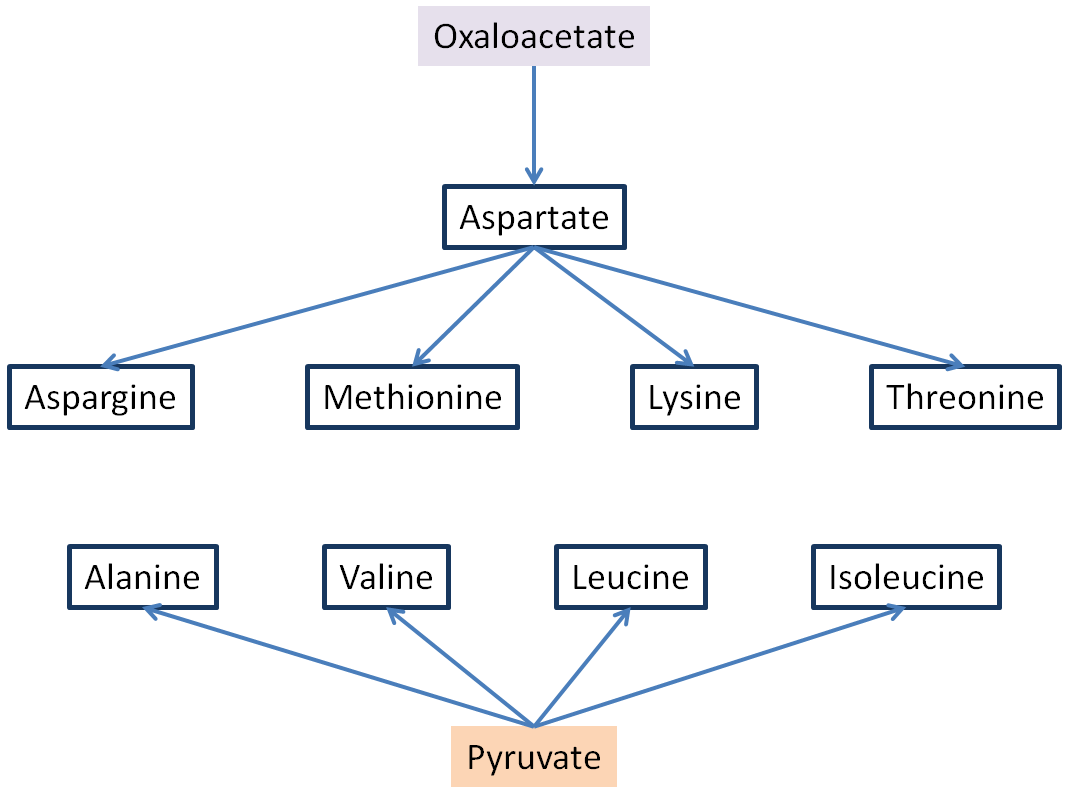
Oxaloacetate and pyruvate aminoacid synthesis

=== Oxalate biosynthesis ===
Oxaloacetate produces oxalate by hydrolysis.

oxaloacetate + H_{2}O ⇌ oxalate + acetate

This process is catalyzed by the enzyme oxaloacetase. This enzyme is seen in plants, but is not known in the animal kingdom.

== Interactive pathway map ==
Click on genes, proteins and metabolites below to link to respective articles. (Note: The interactive pathway map can be edited at WikiPathways: "GlycolysisGluconeogenesis_WP534".)

Glycolysis and Gluconeogenesis edit
Click on genes, proteins and metabolites below to link to respective articles. (Note: The interactive pathway map can be edited at WikiPathways: "TCACycle_WP78".)
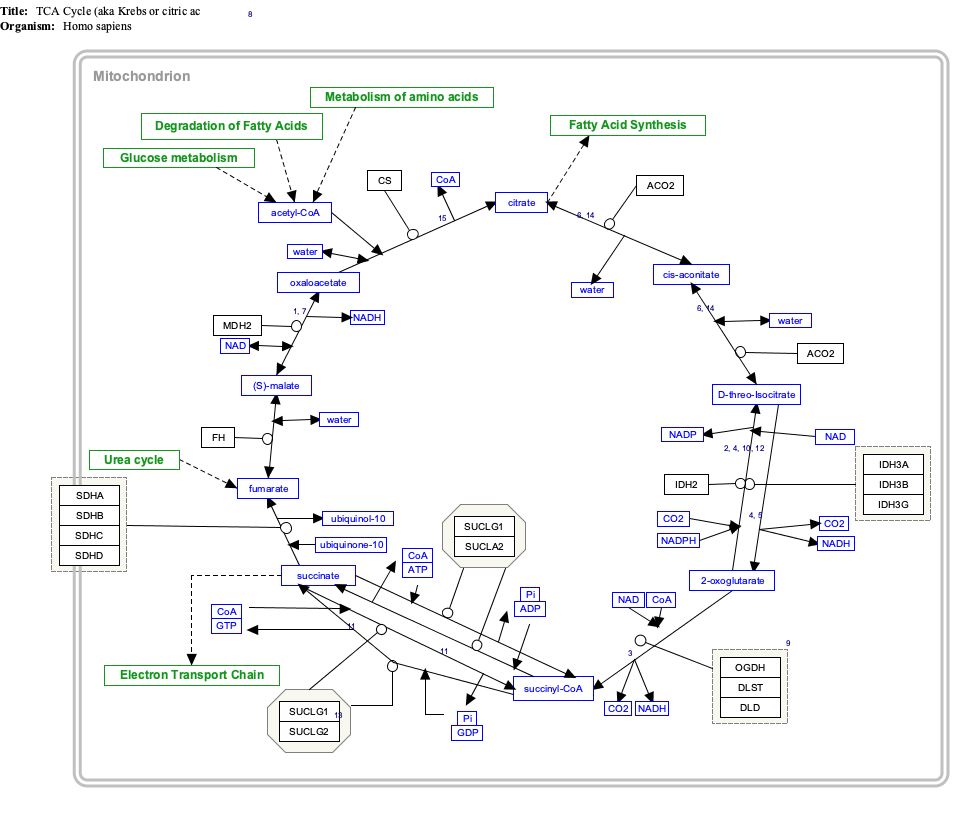

TCACycle_WP78 edit

== See also ==
- Dioxosuccinic acid
- Glycolysis
- Oxidative phosphorylation
- Citric acid cycle
