= Malate dehydrogenase (disambiguation) =

Malate dehydrogenase is an enzyme class (EC 1.1.1.37) that reversibly catalyzes the oxidation of malate to oxaloacetate using the reduction of NAD+ to NADH.

Malate dehydrogenase may also refer to:

== Oxaloacetate forming enzyme classes ==
- Malate dehydrogenase (NADP^{+}) (EC 1.1.1.82), uses NADP(H) as a cofactor instead
- Malate dehydrogenase (NAD(P)^{+}) (EC 1.1.1.299), uses either NAD(H) or NADP(H) as a cofactor
- Malate dehydrogenase (quinone) (EC 1.1.5.4), uses quinone as a cofactor

== Pyruvate forming enzyme classes ==
- Malate dehydrogenase (decarboxylating) (EC 1.1.1.39), produces pyruvate but doesn't act on added oxaloacetate
- Malate dehydrogenase (oxaloacetate-decarboxylating) (EC 1.1.1.38), produces pyruvate and does act on added oxaloacetate
- Malate dehydrogenase (oxaloacetate-decarboxylating) (NADP^{+}) (EC 1.1.1.40), uses NADP(H) as a cofactor to produce pyruvate and does act on added oxaloacetate

== Enzymes ==
- Malate dehydrogenase, mitochondrial, Krebs cycle enzyme (EC 1.1.1.37) encoded by the gene MDH2.

== See also ==
- D-malate dehydrogenase (decarboxylating) (EC 1.1.1.83)
- Malate dehydrogenase, cytoplasmic, enzyme (EC 1.1.1.37) encoded by the MDH1.
