= Malic enzyme =

Index of chemical compounds with the same name.

Malic enzyme (ME) may refer to decarboxylating malate dehydrogenases:

- Malate dehydrogenase (decarboxylating) (EC 1.1.1.39) or NAD-malic enzyme
- Malate dehydrogenase (oxaloacetate-decarboxylating) (EC 1.1.1.38), another NAD-malic enzyme
- Malate dehydrogenase (oxaloacetate-decarboxylating) (NADP+) (EC 1.1.1.40) or NADP-malic enzyme

including

- D-malate dehydrogenase (decarboxylating) (EC 1.1.1.83)
