= Malate dehydrogenase (NAD(P)+) =

Class of enzymes found in archaea

Malate dehydrogenase (NAD(P)^{+})

Identifiers
- EC no.: 1.1.1.299

Databases
- BRENDA: enzyme data
- ExPASy: NiceZyme view
- KEGG: enzyme entry
- MetaCyc: metabolic pathway
- Rhea: reactions
- PDB structures: RCSB PDB PDBe PDBsum
Search
- PMC: articles
- PubMed: articles
- NCBI: proteins

Malate dehydrogenase (NAD(P)^{+}) (EC 1.1.1.299) is a type of enzyme found in archaea with systematic name (S)-malate:NAD(P)^{+} oxidoreductase. This enzyme catalyses the following chemical reaction:

(S)-malic acid
+ NAD^{+}
H^{+}
H^{+}
oxaloacetic acid
+ NADH

The enzyme was characterized from the methanogenic archaeon Methanobacterium thermoautotrophicum, catalyses only the reduction of oxaloacetate, and can use NAD^{+} or NADP^{+} with similar specific activity. It is different from EC 1.1.1.37 (malate dehydrogenase (NAD^{+})), EC 1.1.1.82 (malate dehydrogenase (NADP^{+})) and EC 1.1.5.4 (malate dehydrogenase (quinone)).

== Other names ==
This enzyme has also been called MdH II and NAD(P)^{+}-dependent malate dehyrogenase.
