= Malate oxidase =

malate oxidase

Identifiers
- EC no.: 1.1.3.3
- CAS no.: 9028-73-3

Databases
- BRENDA: enzyme data
- ExPASy: NiceZyme view
- KEGG: enzyme entry
- MetaCyc: metabolic pathway
- Rhea: reactions
- PDB structures: RCSB PDB PDBe PDBsum
- Gene Ontology: AmiGO / QuickGO
Search
- PMC: articles
- PubMed: articles
- NCBI: proteins

In enzymology, a malate oxidase (EC 1.1.3.3) is an enzyme that catalyzes the chemical reaction

(S)-malate + O_{2} $\rightleftharpoons$ oxaloacetate + H_{2}O_{2}

Thus, the two substrates of this enzyme are (S)-malate and O_{2}, whereas its two products are oxaloacetate and H_{2}O_{2}.

This enzyme belongs to the family of oxidoreductases, specifically those acting on the CH-OH group of donor with oxygen as acceptor. The systematic name of this enzyme class is (S)-malate:oxygen oxidoreductase. Other names in common use include FAD-dependent malate oxidase, malic oxidase, and malic dehydrogenase II. This enzyme participates in pyruvate metabolism. It employs one cofactor, FAD. The enzyme is commonly localized on the inner surface of the cytoplasmic membrane although another family member (malate dehydrogenase 2 (NAD)) is found in the mitochondrial matrix.

== Mechanisms ==
Malate oxidase belongs to the family of malate dehydrogenases (EC 1.1.1.37) (MDH) that reversibly catalyze the oxidation of malate to oxaloacetate by means of the reduction of a cofactor. The most common isozymes of malate dehydrogenase use NAD+ or NADP+ as a cofactor to accept electrons and protons.

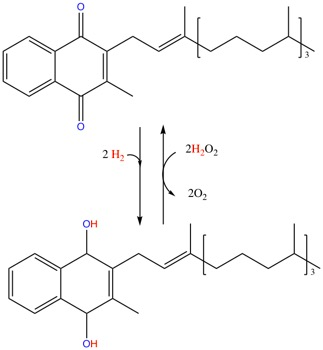
Reduction of Vitamin K by the addition of hydrogen to the quinone ring and reverse oxidation reaction with subsequent formation of H_{2}O_{2} from oxygen

However, the main difference of malate oxidase is that it normally employs FAD as redox partner as alternative. Contrary to pyridine based NAD+/NADP+, FAD comprises a quinone moiety, which is reduced by the forward reaction. FAD is thereby converted to FADH_{2}. In this case, malate oxidase is qualified as malate dehydrogenase (quinone).

In mutant strains of Escherichia coli lacking the activity of NAD-dependent malate dehydrogenase, malate oxidase is expressed. It is suggested that products of malate dehydrogenase could be responsible for repression of malate oxidase. This would confirm the existence of a family of structurally different malate dehydrogenases. Malate oxidase is induced only in cells, which completely lack the activity of NAD-specific malate dehydrogenase.

Irradiation of cytoplasm membranes of Mycobacterium smegmatis with ultraviolet light (360 nm) for 10 minutes resulted in about a 50% loss of malate oxidase activity. The addition of vitamin K, containing a functional naphthoquinone ring, restores the oxidation activity of malate oxidase. The quinone functionality of vitamin K can hence act as an alternative for FAD.

== Biological Reference ==
However, instead of using NAD+, NADP+ or FAD as cofactors, malate oxidase can also shift to oxygen as oxidant and proton acceptor.

(S)-malate + O_{2} ⇌ oxaloacetate + H_{2}O_{2}

Reversible reaction of (S)-malate to oxaloactetate with oxygen as the proton acceptor (oxidant), catalyzed by malate oxidase.

Although seemingly unlikely because of its reactive oxidative character, hydrogen peroxide is found in biological systems including the human body. It signals oxidative stress from wounds to the immune system to recruit white blood cells for the healing process.

A study in Nature suggested that asthma sufferers have higher levels of hydrogen peroxide in their lungs than healthy people, which would explain why these patients also have inappropriate levels of white blood cells in their lungs. Asthma sufferers might have certain variations in cellular levels of NAD+/NADP+ or FAD, which causes malate oxidase to shift to oxygen as its oxidant, due to its high abundancy in the lungs. This could be a possible explanation for the elevated levels of hydrogen peroxide in their lungs.

== Uses ==
Topical compositions of malate oxidase combined with suitable disease-detecting biomarkers and a chemiluminescent dye are used in disease detecting systems. The biomarker activates the malate oxidase to generate hydrogen peroxide that excites the light-emitting dye, which exhibits chemiluminescence in the presence of the peroxide. Such contemporary compositions are thus used as a diagnostic tool for detecting diseases.

In a similar method, malate oxidase is used in the transcutaneous measurement of the amount of a substrate in blood. The method is conducted by contacting the skin with the enzyme, reacting the substrate with the enzyme and directly detecting the amount of H_{2}O_{2} produced as a measure of the amount of substrate in the blood, with use of a hydrogen peroxide electrode. Further dermatological applications are in drugs or cosmetic agents, comprising a suitable substrate and malate oxidase as hydrogen peroxide producing enzyme for skin lightening and age spots or freckles.

Other illustrative uses that employ the capacity of malate oxidase to yield hydrogen peroxide in the presence of a suitable substrate, including malate, are found in toothpaste to remove bacterial plaque, cleaning compositions for removing blood stains and the like, and in the removal of chewing gum lumps stuck on surfaces by enzymatic degradation.

Malate oxidase is also employed in the inhibition of corrosion by dissolved oxygen in water by converting it to hydrogen peroxide, which is subsequently broken down into water and oxygen by catalase.
