= Malic enzyme 3 =

Enzyme found in humans

ME3

Identifiers
- Aliases: ME3, NADP-ME, malic enzyme 3
- External IDs: OMIM: 604626; MGI: 1916679; GeneCards: ME3
Enzyme activity
EC #	BRENDA	ExPASy	KEGG	MetaCyc
1.1.1.40	↗	↗	↗	↗

Gene location (Human)
Chr.	Chromosome 11 (human)
Band	11q14.2	Start	86,441,108 bp
Band	11q14.2	End	86,672,636 bp

Gene location (Mouse)
Chr.	Chromosome 7 (mouse)
Band	7|7 D3	Start	89,281,600 bp
Band	7|7 D3	End	89,503,567 bp
RNA expression pattern
Bgee	Human / Mouse (ortholog); Top expressed in: apex of heart; left ovary; anterior pituitary; nasal epithelium; lateral nuclear group of thalamus; right ovary; right adrenal cortex; canal of the cervix; left adrenal cortex; caudate nucleus / Top expressed in: interventricular septum; muscle of thigh; dentate gyrus of hippocampal formation granule cell; superior frontal gyrus; skeletal muscle tissue; visual cortex; primary visual cortex; quadriceps femoris muscle; tibialis anterior muscle; knee joint; More reference expression data
BioGPS	n/a
Gene ontology
Molecular function	malate dehydrogenase (decarboxylating) (NAD+) activity; oxidoreductase activity; NAD binding; oxaloacetate decarboxylase activity; metal ion binding; malic enzyme activity; malate dehydrogenase (decarboxylating) (NADP+) activity
Cellular component	mitochondrion; mitochondrial matrix
Biological process	aerobic dissimilation; oxygen metabolic process; pyruvate metabolic process; malate metabolic process; tricarboxylic acid cycle
Sources:Amigo / QuickGO
Orthologs
Databases	NCBI: entry; OMA: entry
Species	Human	Mouse
Entrez	10873	109264
Ensembl	ENSG00000151376	ENSMUSG00000030621
UniProt	Q16798; Q6TCH8	Q8BMF3
RefSeq (mRNA)	NM_001014811; NM_001161586; NM_006680; NM_001351934; NM_001395868	NM_181407
RefSeq (protein)	NP_001014811; NP_001155058; NP_006671; NP_001338863; NP_001014811.1 NP_006671.2	NP_852072
Location (UCSC)	Chr 11: 86.44 – 86.67 Mb	Chr 7: 89.28 – 89.5 Mb
PubMed search
- Wikidata
View/Edit Human	View/Edit Mouse

Malic enzyme 3, also called mitochondrial NADP-dependent malic enzyme, is an enzyme that in humans is encoded by the gene ME3. This enzyme function acts as a NADP-dependent malic enzyme (NADP-ME, EC 1.1.1.40), meaning it can act on both malate and oxaloacetate to (ultimately) produce pyruvate. Unlike malic enzyme 1, the other NADP-ME found in humans, this form is found in the mitochondria.

== Function ==
As a NADP-dependent malic enzyme, also called malate dehydrogenase (oxaloacetate-decarboxylating, NADP+) (EC 1.1.1.40), this enzyme catalyzes the following pair of reactions:

(S)-malate + NADP^{+} ⇌ pyruvate + CO_{2} + NADPH
oxaloacetate + H^{+} → pyruvate + CO_{2}

Malic enzymes like ME3 function to link glycolosis to the citric acid cycle. Mutations in ME3 have not yet been associated with any disease, which is suggestive that its role may be redundant with the mitochondrial NAD-dependent malic enzyme ME2.
