= ME1 =

ME1 or ME-1 may refer to:

- ME1 (gene)
- Maine's 1st congressional district
- Mass Effect (video game)
- U.S. Route 1 in Maine
- SIRT ME-1
- Me1 vs Me2 Snooker with Richard Herring
