= ME3 =

ME3 may refer to:

- ME3 (gene)
- Maine's 3rd congressional district
- Maine State Route 3
- Mass Effect 3
- ME3 carriers
