= PCK2 =

Protein-coding gene in the species Homo sapiens

Identifiers
- Aliases: PCK2, PEPCK, PEPCK-M, PEphosphoenolpyruvate carboxykinase 2, mitochondrial
- External IDs: OMIM: 614095; MGI: 1860456; GeneCards: PCK2
Enzyme activity
EC #	BRENDA	ExPASy	KEGG	MetaCyc
4.1.1.32	↗	↗	↗	↗

Gene location (Human)
Chr.	Chromosome 14 (human)
Band	14q11.2-q12	Start	24,094,053 bp
Band	14q11.2-q12	End	24,110,598 bp

Gene location (Mouse)
Chr.	Chromosome 14 (mouse)
Band	14 C3|14 28.19 cM	Start	55,777,723 bp
Band	14 C3|14 28.19 cM	End	55,788,699 bp
RNA expression pattern
Bgee	Human / Mouse (ortholog); Top expressed in: right lobe of liver; mucosa of transverse colon; rectum; gastric mucosa; body of pancreas; granulocyte; right lobe of thyroid gland; left lobe of thyroid gland; monocyte; appendix / Top expressed in: calvaria; seminal vesicula; lacrimal gland; islet of Langerhans; salivary gland; fetal liver hematopoietic progenitor cell; molar; submandibular gland; body of femur; parotid gland; More reference expression data
BioGPS	n/a
Gene ontology
Molecular function	nucleotide binding; GTP binding; protein binding; carboxy-lyase activity; purine nucleotide binding; metal ion binding; lyase activity; phosphoenolpyruvate carboxykinase activity; phosphoenolpyruvate carboxykinase (GTP) activity; manganese ion binding
Cellular component	mitochondrial matrix; mitochondrion; cytosol
Biological process	gluconeogenesis; positive regulation of insulin secretion; response to lipopolysaccharide; cellular response to tumor necrosis factor; oxaloacetate metabolic process; pyruvate metabolic process; NADH oxidation; response to dexamethasone; cellular response to glucose stimulus; propionate catabolic process; cellular response to insulin stimulus; response to lipid; response to starvation; glyceroneogenesis; hepatocyte differentiation; cellular response to dexamethasone stimulus
Sources:Amigo / QuickGO
Orthologs
Databases	NCBI: entry; OMA: entry
Species	Human	Mouse
Entrez	5106	74551
Ensembl	ENSG00000100889; ENSG00000285241	ENSMUSG00000040618
UniProt	Q16822	Q8BH04
RefSeq (mRNA)	NM_001018073; NM_001291556; NM_001308054; NM_004563	NM_028994
RefSeq (protein)	NP_001018083; NP_001278485; NP_001294983; NP_004554	NP_083270
Location (UCSC)	Chr 14: 24.09 – 24.11 Mb	Chr 14: 55.78 – 55.79 Mb
PubMed search
- Wikidata
View/Edit Human	View/Edit Mouse

Phosphoenolpyruvate carboxykinase 2, mitochondrial (PCK2, PEPCK-M), is an isozyme of phosphoenolpyruvate carboxykinase (PCK, PEPCK) that in humans is encoded by the PCK2 gene on chromosome 14. This gene encodes a mitochondrial enzyme that catalyzes the conversion of oxaloacetate (OAA) to phosphoenolpyruvate (PEP) in the presence of guanosine triphosphate (GTP). A cytosolic form of this protein is encoded by a different gene and is the key enzyme of gluconeogenesis in the liver. Alternatively spliced transcript variants have been described.[provided by RefSeq, Apr 2014]

== Structure ==
The PCK2 gene encodes the mitochondrial form of PCK and shares a 68% homology in DNA sequence with PCK1 and 70% homology in amino acid sequence with its encoded cytosolic form, PCK1. Moreover, PCK2 shares structural homology with PCK1, indicating that the genes originated from a common ancestor gene. Nonetheless, though both genes possess ten exons and nine introns, the sizes of their introns may differ by ~2 kb, with the largest intron in PCK2 spanning 2.5 kb. Altogether, the total length of the PCK2 gene spans ~10 kb. Another difference is the presence of Alu sequences in its introns that are absent in PCK1. PCK2 also contains an 18-residue mitochondrial targeting sequence at its N-terminal. Potential regulatory elements, including five GC boxes and three CCAAT boxes, lie 1819 bp upstream of the transcription start site. In addition, the proximal promoter region of PCK2 contains two putative ATF/CRE sequences which bind ATF4.

== Function ==
As a PCK, PCK2 catalyzes the GTP-driven conversion of OAA to PEP as a rate-limiting step in gluconeogenesis. This conversion step serves as a bridge between glycolytic and TCA cycle intermediates in the mitochondria. In pancreatic β-cells, PCK2 regulates glucose-stimulated insulin secretion by recycling GTP generated from the succinyl-CoA synthase reaction. This drives the TCA cycle, converting PEP to pyruvate to acetyl-CoA for the citrate synthase reaction. Since nearly all of the glycolytic reactions upstream of PEP and downstream of glucose-6-phosphate (G6P) are reversible, PCK2-mediated synthesis of PEP could fuel multiple biosynthetic processes, such as serine synthesis, glycerol synthesis, and nucleotide synthesis. Notably, PCK2 preferentially converts OAA derived from lactate and, thus, can promote biosynthesis even under low-glucose conditions. As a result, PCK2 activity contributes to cell growth and survival during stress.

While PCK1 is mainly expressed in the liver and kidney, PCK2 is ubiquitously expressed in various cell types, including leukocytes and neurons, as well as in non-gluconeogenic tissues, including pancreas, brain, heart. Moreover, while PCK1 expression is regulated by hormones or nutrients involved in gluconeogenesis, PCK2 is constitutively expressed. These differences indicate that PCK2 may also perform non-gluconeogenic functions.

== Clinical Significance ==
PCK2 is associated with several cancers, including lung cancer, and promotes tumorigenesis through its gluconeogenic function. In low-glucose settings, stress to the endoplasmic reticulum upregulates ATF4, which then upregulates PCK2. As PCK2 allows cells to utilize alternative cataplerotic pathways to convert TCA cycle intermediates to glycolytic intermediates, PCK2 activity can enhance the survival tumor cells facing reduced glucose levels.

Due to the gluconeogenic function of PCK2, PCK2 deficiency is expected to disrupt glucose homeostasis and result in hypoglycemia. However, though two cases have been documented, a subsequent study suggested that PCK2 deficiency may not have been the primary cause.

== Interactive pathway map ==
Click on genes, proteins and metabolites below to link to respective articles. (Note: The interactive pathway map can be edited at WikiPathways: "GlycolysisGluconeogenesis_WP534".)

Glycolysis and Gluconeogenesis edit

== See also ==
- Phosphoenolpyruvate carboxykinase
- PCK1
