= Diiodophenylpyruvate reductase =

diiodophenylpyruvate reductase

Identifiers
- EC no.: 1.1.1.96
- CAS no.: 37250-31-0

Databases
- IntEnz: IntEnz view
- BRENDA: BRENDA entry
- ExPASy: NiceZyme view
- KEGG: KEGG entry
- MetaCyc: metabolic pathway
- PRIAM: profile
- PDB structures: RCSB PDB PDBe PDBsum
- Gene Ontology: AmiGO / QuickGO
Search
- PMC: articles
- PubMed: articles
- NCBI: proteins

In enzymology, a diiodophenylpyruvate reductase (EC 1.1.1.96) is an enzyme that catalyzes the chemical reaction

3-(3,5-diiodo-4-hydroxyphenyl)lactate + NAD^{+} $\rightleftharpoons$ 3-(3,5-diiodo-4-hydroxyphenyl)pyruvate + NADH + H^{+}

Thus, the two substrates of this enzyme are 3-(3,5-diiodo-4-hydroxyphenyl)lactate and NAD^{+}, whereas its 3 products are 3-(3,5-diiodo-4-hydroxyphenyl)pyruvate, NADH, and H^{+}.

This enzyme belongs to the family of oxidoreductases, specifically those acting on the CH-OH group of donor with NAD^{+} or NADP^{+} as acceptor. The systematic name of this enzyme class is 3-(3,5-diiodo-4-hydroxyphenyl)lactate:NAD^{+} oxidoreductase. Other names in common use include aromatic alpha-keto acid, KAR, and 2-oxo acid reductase.

In 2025, this enzyme was found to be identical to EC 1.1.1.37, (S)-malate dehydrogenase.
