= PEPCK-Cmus mouse =

PEPCK-C^{mus} mice are genetically modified mice (Mus musculus) which as a result of their modification have up to 100 times the concentration of the PEPCK-C enzyme in their muscles, compared to ordinary mice.

They were created by a team of American scientists led by Richard Hanson, professor of biochemistry at Case Western Reserve University at Cleveland, Ohio, to gain a greater understanding of the PEPCK-C enzyme, which is present mainly in the liver and kidneys.

Professor Hanson noted that PEPCK-C^{mus} mice, dubbed "the mighty mice", "are metabolically similar to Lance Armstrong biking up the Pyrenees. They utilize mainly fatty acids for energy and produce very little lactic acid. Without eating or drinking, they can run for four or five hours. They are 10 times more active than ordinary mice in their home cage. They also live longer – up to three years of age – and are reproductively active for almost three years. In short, they are remarkable animals." However, "they eat twice as much as control mice, but they are half the weight, and are very aggressive. Why this is the case, we are not really sure."

While PEPCK-Cmus Humans weren't sighted yet, it's noted that "their [mice's] longevity and reproductive vigor has direct application to human performance".

== See also ==
- Oncomouse
- Knockout mice
- Transhumanism
