= Phosphoenolpyruvate carboxykinase =

Enzyme

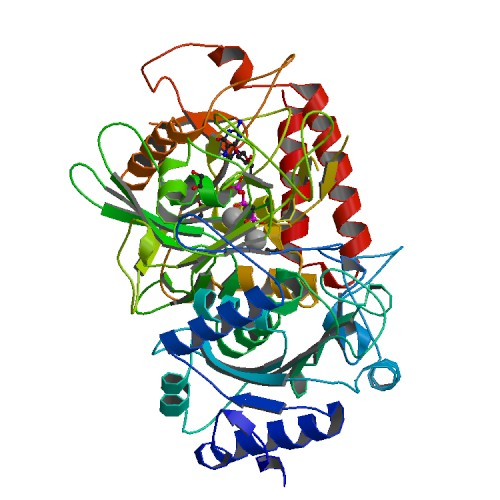
- PDB rendering based on 1khb.

Identifiers
- Symbol: PEPCK
- Pfam: PF00821
- InterPro: IPR008209
- PROSITE: PDOC00421
- SCOP2: 1khf / SCOPe / SUPFAM
Available protein structures:
- PDB: 1khb, 1khe, 1khf, 1khg, 1m51, 1nhx, 2gmv IPR008209 PF00821 (ECOD; PDBsum)
- AlphaFold: IPR008209; PF00821

phosphoenolpyruvate carboxykinase 1 (soluble)
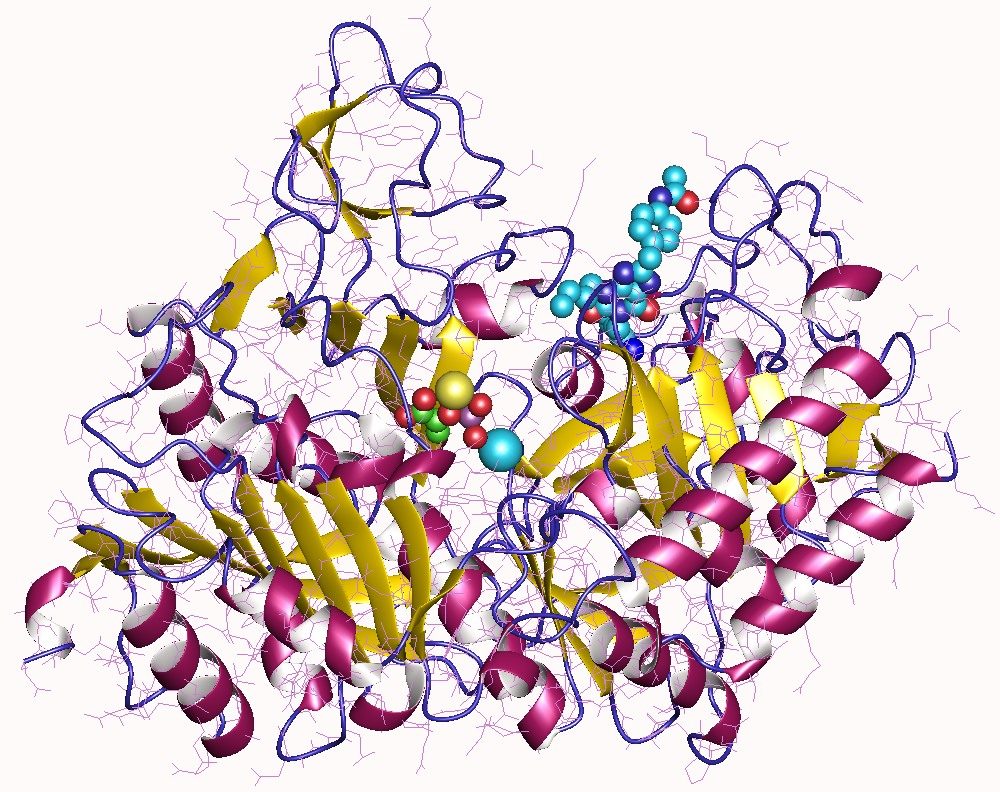
- Phosphoenolpyruvate carboxykinase (GTP, cytosolic) monomer, Human

Identifiers
- Symbol: PCK1
- Alt. symbols: PEPCK-C
- NCBI gene: 5105
- HGNC: 8724
- OMIM: 261680
- RefSeq: NM_002591

Other data
- EC number: 4.1.1.32
- Locus: Chr. 20 q13.31

phosphoenolpyruvate carboxykinase 2 (mitochondrial)

Identifiers
- Symbol: PCK2
- Alt. symbols: PEPCK-M, PEPCK2
- NCBI gene: 5106
- HGNC: 8725
- OMIM: 261650
- RefSeq: NM_001018073

Other data
- EC number: 4.1.1.32
- Locus: Chr. 14 q12

Phosphoenolpyruvate carboxykinase (EC 4.1.1.32, PEPCK) is an enzyme in the lyase family used in the metabolic pathway of gluconeogenesis. It converts oxaloacetate into phosphoenolpyruvate and carbon dioxide.

It is found in two forms, cytosolic and mitochondrial.

== Structure ==
In humans there are two isoforms of PEPCK; a cytosolic form (SwissProt P35558) and a mitochondrial isoform (SwissProt Q16822) which have 63.4% sequence identity. The cytosolic form is important in gluconeogenesis. However, there is a known transport mechanism to move PEP from the mitochondria to the cytosol, using specific membrane transport proteins. PEP transport across the inner mitochondrial membrane involves the mitochondrial tricarboxylate transport protein and to a lesser extent the adenine nucleotide carrier. The possibility of a PEP/pyruvate transporter has also been put forward.

X-ray structures of PEPCK provide insight into the structure and the mechanism of PEPCK enzymatic activity. The mitochondrial isoform of chicken liver PEPCK complexed with Mn^{2+}, Mn2+-phosphoenolpyruvate (PEP), and Mn^{2+}-GDP provides information about its structure and how this enzyme catalyzes reactions. Delbaere et al. (2004) resolved PEPCK in E. coli and found the active site sitting between a C-terminal domain and an N-terminal domain. The active site was observed to be closed upon rotation of these domains.

Phosphoryl groups are transferred during PEPCK action, which is likely facilitated by the eclipsed conformation of the phosphoryl groups when ATP is bound to PEPCK.

Since the eclipsed formation is one that is high in energy, phosphoryl group transfer has a decreased energy of activation, meaning that the groups will transfer more readily. This transfer likely happens via a mechanism similar to SN2 displacement.

=== In different species ===
PEPCK gene transcription occurs in many species, and the amino acid sequence of PEPCK is distinct for each species.

For example, its structure and its specificity differ in humans, Escherichia coli (E. coli), and the parasiteTrypanosoma cruzi.

== Mechanism ==
PEPCKase converts oxaloacetic acid and inorganic orthophosphate (P_{i}) into phosphoenolpyruvic acid and carbon dioxide:

oxaloacetic acid
P_{i}
CO_{2}
phosphoenolpyruvic acid

As PEPCK acts at the junction between glycolysis and the Krebs cycle, it causes decarboxylation of a C_{4} molecule, creating a C_{3} molecule. As the first committed step in gluconeogenesis, PEPCK decarboxylates and phosphorylates oxaloacetate (OAA) for its conversion to PEP, when GTP is present. As a phosphate is transferred, the reaction results in a GDP molecule. When pyruvate kinase – the enzyme that normally catalyzes the reaction that converts PEP to pyruvate – is knocked out in mutants of Bacillus subtilis, PEPCK participates in one of the replacement anaplerotic reactions, working in the reverse direction of its normal function, converting PEP to OAA. Although this reaction is possible, the kinetics are so unfavorable that the mutants grow at a very slow pace or do not grow at all.

== Function ==
=== Gluconeogenesis ===
PEPCK-C catalyzes an irreversible step of gluconeogenesis, the process whereby glucose is synthesized. The enzyme has therefore been thought to be essential in glucose homeostasis, as evidenced by laboratory mice that contracted diabetes mellitus type 2 as a result of the overexpression of PEPCK-C.

The role that PEPCK-C plays in gluconeogenesis may be mediated by the citric acid cycle, the activity of which was found to be directly related to PEPCK-C abundance.

PEPCK-C levels alone were not highly correlated with gluconeogenesis in the mouse liver, as previous studies have suggested. While the mouse liver almost exclusively expresses PEPCK-C, humans equally present a mitochondrial isozyme (PEPCK-M). PEPCK-M has gluconeogenic potential per se. Therefore, the role of PEPCK-C and PEPCK-M in gluconeogenesis may be more complex and involve more factors than was previously believed.

=== Animals ===
In animals, this is a rate-controlling step of gluconeogenesis, the process by which cells synthesize glucose from metabolic precursors. The blood glucose level is maintained within well-defined limits in part due to precise regulation of PEPCK gene expression. To emphasize the importance of PEPCK in glucose homeostasis, over expression of this enzyme in mice results in symptoms of type II diabetes mellitus, by far the most common form of diabetes in humans. Due to the importance of blood glucose homeostasis, a number of hormones regulate a set of genes (including PEPCK) in the liver that modulate the rate of glucose synthesis.

PEPCK-C is controlled by two different hormonal mechanisms. PEPCK-C activity is increased upon the secretion of both cortisol from the adrenal cortex and glucagon from the alpha cells of the pancreas. Glucagon indirectly elevates the expression of PEPCK-C by increasing the levels of cAMP (via activation of adenylyl cyclase) in the liver which consequently leads to the phosphorylation of S133 on a beta sheet in the CREB protein. CREB then binds upstream of the PEPCK-C gene at CRE (cAMP response element) and induces PEPCK-C transcription. Cortisol on the other hand, when released by the adrenal cortex, passes through the lipid membrane of liver cells (due to its hydrophobic nature it can pass directly through cell membranes) and then binds to a Glucocorticoid Receptor (GR). This receptor dimerizes and the cortisol/GR complex passes into the nucleus where it then binds to the Glucocorticoid Response Element (GRE) region in a similar manner to CREB and produces similar results (synthesis of more PEPCK-C).

Together, cortisol and glucagon can have huge synergistic results, activating the PEPCK-C gene to levels that neither cortisol or glucagon could reach on their own. PEPCK-C is most abundant in the liver, kidney, and adipose tissue.

A collaborative study between the U.S. Environmental Protection Agency (EPA) and the University of New Hampshire investigated the effect of DE-71, a commercial PBDE mixture, on PEPCK enzyme kinetics and determined that in vivo treatment of the environmental pollutant compromises liver glucose and lipid metabolism possibly by activation of the pregnane xenobiotic receptor (PXR), and may influence whole-body insulin sensitivity.

Researchers at Case Western Reserve University have discovered that overexpression of cytosolic PEPCK in skeletal muscle of mice causes them to be more active, more aggressive, and have longer lives than normal mice; see metabolic supermice.

=== Plants ===
PEPCK (EC 4.1.1.49) is one of three decarboxylation enzymes used in the inorganic carbon concentrating mechanisms of C_{4} and CAM plants. The others are NADP-malic enzyme and NAD-malic enzyme. In C_{4} carbon fixation, carbon dioxide is first fixed by combination with phosphoenolpyruvate to form oxaloacetate in the mesophyll. In PEPCK-type C_{4} plants the oxaloacetate is then converted to aspartate, which travels to the bundle sheath. In the bundle sheath cells, aspartate is converted back to oxaloacetate. PEPCK decarboxylates the bundle sheath oxaloacetate, releasing carbon dioxide, which is then fixed by the enzyme Rubisco. For each molecule of carbon dioxide produced by PEPCK, a molecule of ATP is consumed.

PEPCK acts in plants that undergo C_{4} carbon fixation, where its action has been localized to the cytosol, in contrast to mammals, where it has been found that PEPCK works in mitochondria.

Although it is found in many different parts of plants, it has been seen only in specific cell types, including the areas of the phloem.

It has also been discovered that, in cucumber (Cucumis sativus L.), PEPCK levels are increased by multiple effects that are known to decrease the cellular pH of plants, although these effects are specific to the part of the plant.

PEPCK levels rose in roots and stems when the plants were watered with ammonium chloride at a low pH (but not at high pH), or with butyric acid. However, PEPCK levels did not increase in leaves under these conditions.

In leaves, 5% CO_{2} content in the atmosphere leads to higher PEPCK abundance.

=== Bacteria ===
In an effort to explore the role of PEPCK, researchers caused the overexpression of PEPCK in E. coli bacteria via recombinant DNA.

PEPCK of Mycobacterium tuberculosis has been shown to trigger the immune system in mice by increasing cytokine activity.

As a result, it has been found that PEPCK may be an appropriate ingredient in the development of an effective subunit vaccination for tuberculosis.

== Clinical significance ==
=== Activity in cancer ===
PEPCK has not been considered in cancer research until recently. It has been shown that in human tumor samples and human cancer cell lines (breast, colon and lung cancer cells) PEPCK-M, and not PEPCK-C, was expressed at enough levels to play a relevant metabolic role. Therefore, PEPCK-M could have a role in cancer cells, especially under nutrient limitation or other stress conditions.

== Regulation ==
=== In humans ===
PEPCK-C is enhanced, both in terms of its production and activation, by many factors. Transcription of the PEPCK-C gene is stimulated by glucagon, glucocorticoids, retinoic acid, and adenosine 3',5'-monophosphate (cAMP), while it is inhibited by insulin. Of these factors, insulin, a hormone that is deficient in the case of type 1 diabetes mellitus, is considered dominant, as it inhibits the transcription of many of the stimulatory elements. PEPCK activity is also inhibited by hydrazine sulfate, and the inhibition therefore decreases the rate of gluconeogenesis.

In prolonged acidosis, PEPCK-C is upregulated in renal proximal tubule brush border cells, in order to secrete more NH_{3} and thus to produce more HCO_{3}^{−}.

The GTP-specific activity of PEPCK is highest when Mn^{2+} and Mg^{2+} are available. In addition, hyper-reactive cysteine (C307) is involved in the binding of Mn^{2+} to the active site.

=== Plants ===
As discussed previously, PEPCK abundance increased when plants were watered with low-pH ammonium chloride, though high pH did not have this effect.

== Classification ==
It is classified under EC number 4.1.1. There are three main types, distinguished by the source of the energy to drive the reaction:

- 4.1.1.32 – GTP (PCK1, PCK2)
- 4.1.1.38 – diphosphate
- 4.1.1.49 – ATP
