= Malate dehydrogenase =

Class of enzymes

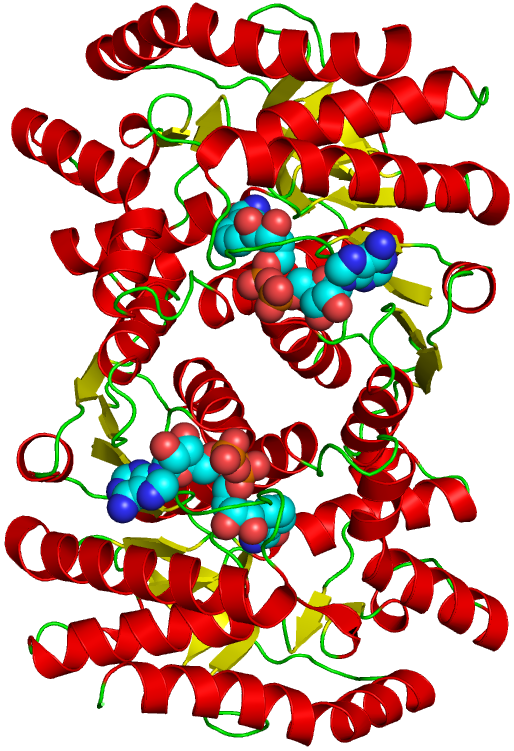
- Structure of the protein with attached cofactors

Identifiers
- EC no.: 1.1.1.37
- CAS no.: 9001-64-3

Databases
- BRENDA: enzyme data
- ExPASy: NiceZyme view
- KEGG: enzyme entry
- MetaCyc: metabolic pathway
- Rhea: reactions
- PDB structures: RCSB PDB PDBe PDBsum
Search
- PMC: articles
- PubMed: articles
- NCBI: proteins

Malate dehydrogenases (EC 1.1.1.37) (MDH) are a type of enzyme that reversibly catalyze the oxidation of malate to oxaloacetate using the reduction of the cofactor NAD^{+} to NADH. This reaction is part of many metabolic pathways, including the citric acid cycle. In humans, there are separate cytoplasmic (MDH1) and mitochondrial (MDH2) forms.

There are also other malate dehydrogenase enzyme classes which use different cofactors (like malate dehydrogenase (NADP^{+})) or further break down oxaloacetate into pyruvate (like malate dehydrogenase (oxaloacetate-decarboxylating)). These have different EC numbers and their names are often qualified like to avoid confusion.

== Isozymes ==
Several isozymes of malate dehydrogenase exist. There are two main isoforms in eukaryotic cells. One is found in the mitochondrial matrix, participating as a key enzyme in the citric acid cycle that catalyzes the oxidation of malate. The other is found in the cytoplasm, assisting the malate-aspartate shuttle with exchanging reducing equivalents so that malate can pass through the mitochondrial membrane to be transformed into oxaloacetate for further cellular processes.

Humans and most other mammals express the following two malate dehydrogenases:

malate dehydrogenase 1, NAD (cytoplasmic)

Identifiers
- Symbol: MDH1
- NCBI gene: 4190
- HGNC: 6970
- OMIM: 154200
- RefSeq: NM_005917
- UniProt: P40925

Other data
- EC number: 1.1.1.37
- Locus: Chr. 2 p23
Search for
- Structures: Swiss-model
- Domains: InterPro

malate dehydrogenase 2, NAD (mitochondrial)
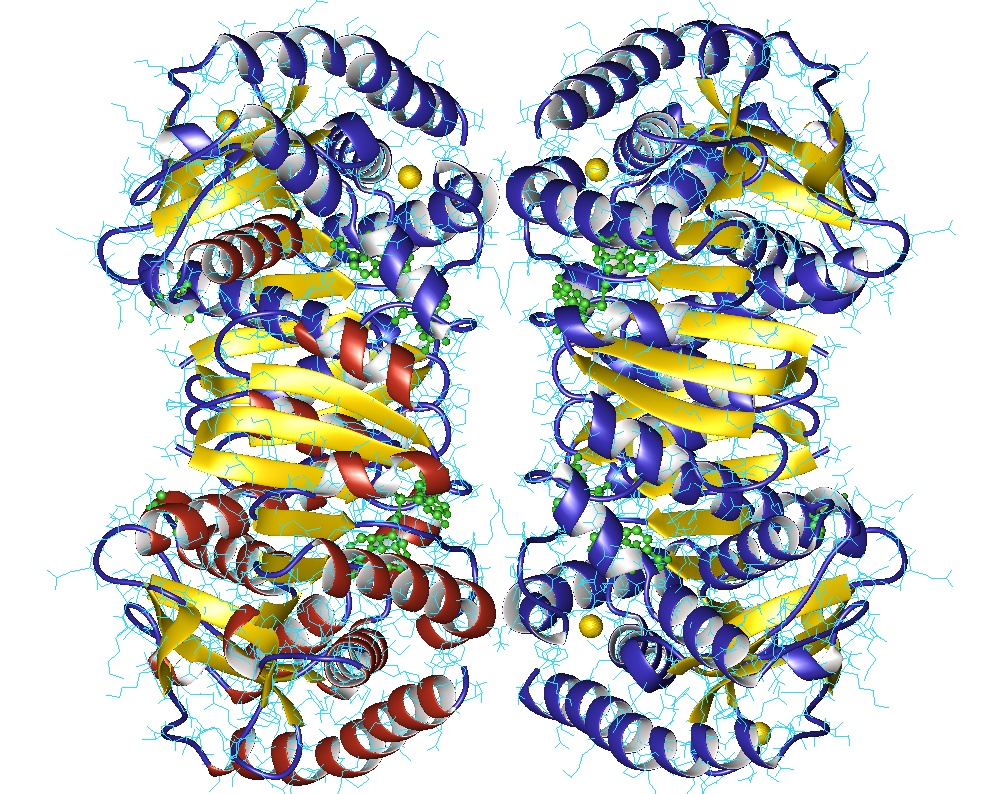
- Malate dehydrogenase 2, homotetramer, Human

Identifiers
- Symbol: MDH2
- NCBI gene: 4191
- HGNC: 6971
- OMIM: 154100
- RefSeq: NM_005918
- UniProt: P40926

Other data
- EC number: 1.1.1.37
- Locus: Chr. 7 cen-q22
Search for
- Structures: Swiss-model
- Domains: InterPro

== Protein families ==
lactate/malate dehydrogenase, NAD binding domain

Identifiers
- Symbol: Ldh_1_N
- Pfam: PF00056
- Pfam clan: CL0063
- InterPro: IPR001236
- SCOP2: 6ldh / SCOPe / SUPFAM
Available protein structures:
- PDB: IPR001236 PF00056 (ECOD; PDBsum)
- AlphaFold: IPR001236; PF00056

lactate/malate dehydrogenase, alpha/beta C-terminal domain

Identifiers
- Symbol: Ldh_1_C
- Pfam: PF02866
- Pfam clan: CL0341
- InterPro: IPR022383
- PROSITE: PDOC00066
- SCOP2: 6ldh / SCOPe / SUPFAM
Available protein structures:
- PDB: IPR022383 PF02866 (ECOD; PDBsum)
- AlphaFold: IPR022383; PF02866

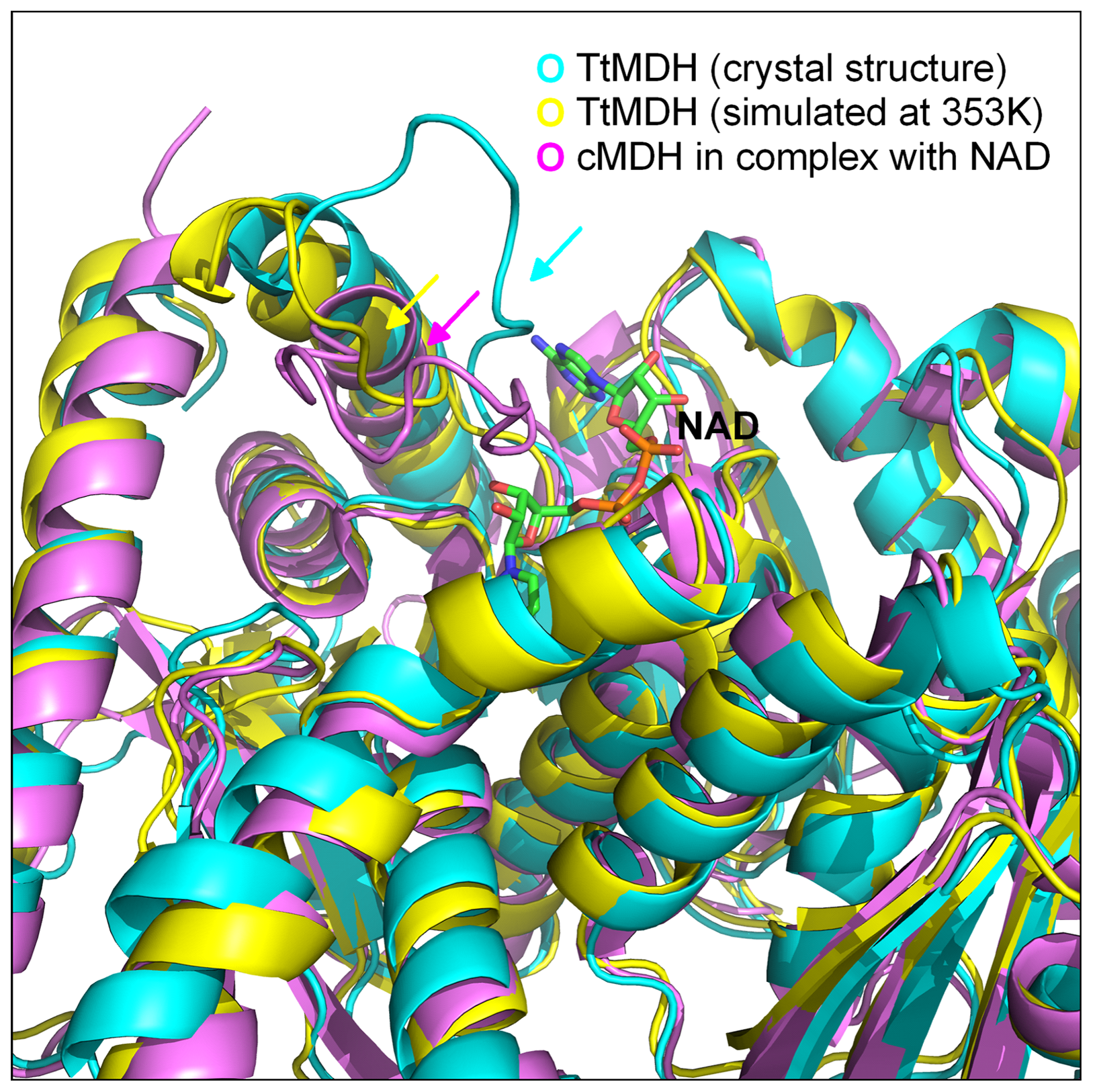
3-D crystal structure of the mobile loop region in malate dehydrogenase in the closed and open conformation. The MDH closed conformation is shown in pink (indicated by the pink arrow) while the open conformation is shown in cyan (indicated by the cyan arrow).

The malate dehydrogenase family contains L-lactate dehydrogenase and L-2-hydroxyisocaproate dehydrogenases. L-lactate dehydrogenases catalyzes the conversion of L-lactate to pyruvate, the last step in anaerobic glycolysis. The N-terminus is a Rossmann NAD-binding fold and the C-terminus is an unusual alpha+beta fold.

== Evolution and structure ==
In most organisms, malate dehydrogenase (MDH) exists as a homodimeric molecule and is closely related to lactate dehydrogenase (LDH) in structure. It is a large protein molecule with subunits weighing between 30 and 35 kDa. Based on the amino acid sequences, it seems that MDH has diverged into two main phylogenetic groups that closely resemble either mitochondrial isozymes or cytoplasmic/chloroplast isozymes. Because the sequence identity of malate dehydrogenase in the mitochondria is more closely related to its prokaryotic ancestors in comparison to the cytoplasmic isozyme, the theory that mitochondria and chloroplasts were developed through endosymbiosis is plausible. The amino acid sequences of archaeal MDH are more similar to that of LDH than that of MDH of other organisms. This indicates that there is a possible evolutionary linkage between lactate dehydrogenase and malate dehydrogenase.

Each subunit of the malate dehydrogenase dimer has two distinct domains that vary in structure and functionality. A parallel β-sheet structure makes up the NAD+ binding domain, while four β-sheets and one α-helix comprise the central NAD^{+} binding site. The subunits are held together through extensive hydrogen-bonding and hydrophobic interactions.

Malate dehydrogenase has also been shown to have a mobile loop region that plays a crucial role in the enzyme's catalytic activity. Studies have shown that conformational change of this loop region from the open conformation to the closed conformation after binding of substrate enhances MDH catalysis through shielding of substrate and catalytic amino acids from solvent. Studies have also indicated that this loop region is highly conserved in malate dehydrogenase.

== Mechanism ==
Active site of malate dehydrogenase

The active site of malate dehydrogenase is a hydrophobic cavity within the protein complex that has specific binding sites for the substrate and its coenzyme, NAD^{+}. In its active state, MDH undergoes a conformational change that encloses the substrate to minimize solvent exposure and to position key residues in closer proximity to the substrate. The three residues in particular that comprise a catalytic triad are histidine (His-195), aspartate (Asp-168), both of which work together as a proton transfer system, and arginines (Arg-102, Arg-109, Arg-171), which secure the substrate.

Mechanistically, malate dehydrogenase catalyzes the oxidation of the hydroxyl group of malate by utilizing NAD^{+} as an electron acceptor. This oxidation step results in the elimination of a proton and a hydride ion from the substrate. NAD^{+} receives the hydride ion (specifically, the hydride ion is transferred to the nicotinamide ring of the NAD^{+}) and becomes reduced to NADH while concomitantly, the His-195 residue on the enzyme accepts the proton. The positively charged His-195 residue, which is involved in base catalysis of the substrate, is stabilized by the adjacent, negatively charged Asp-168 residue. This electrostatic stabilization helps facilitate the transfer of the proton. Arg-102, Arg-109, and Arg-171 (which are protonated, and thus positively charged) participate in electrostatic catalysis and help to bind the negatively charged carboxylates on the substrate. Additionally, the Arginine residues on the enzyme provide additional substrate specificity and binding through hydrogen bonding between the guanidinium side chain of the Arginine amino acid residues and the carboxylates of the substrate.

Studies have also identified a mobile loop in malate dehydrogenase that participates in the catalytic activity of the enzyme. The loop undergoes a conformational change to shield the substrate and catalytic amino acids from the solvent in response to the binding of the malate dehydrogenase:coenzyme complex to substrate. This flipping of the loop to the up position to cover the active site also promotes enhanced interaction of the catalytically important amino residues on the enzyme with the substrate. Additionally, the movement of the loop has been shown to correlate with the rate determining step of the enzyme.

== Function ==
=== Reaction ===
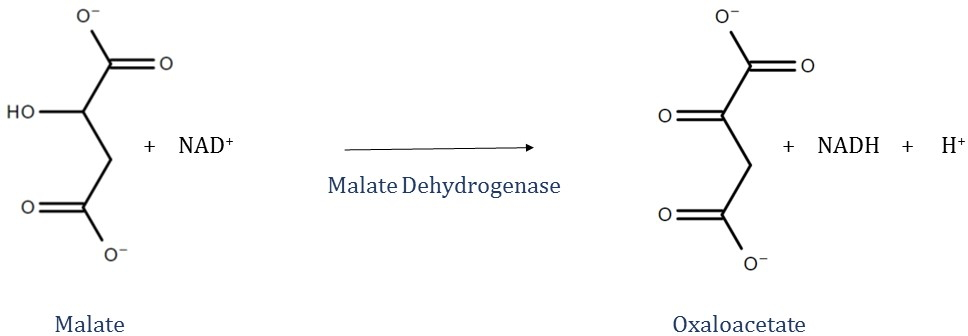
General reaction showing malate dehydrogenase catalyzed oxidation of malate through reduction of NAD^{+}.

Malate dehydrogenases catalyzes the interconversion of malate to oxaloacetate. In the citric acid cycle, malate dehydrogenase is responsible for catalyzing the regeneration of oxaloacetate This reaction occurs through the oxidation of hydroxyl group on malate and reduction of NAD^{+}. The mechanism of the transfer of the hydride ion to NAD^{+} is carried out in a similar mechanism seen in lactate dehydrogenase and alcohol dehydrogenase. The ΔG'° of malate dehydrogenase is +29.7 kJ/mol and the ΔG (in the cell) is 0 kJ/mol.

=== Other pathways ===
Malate dehydrogenase is also involved in gluconeogenesis, the synthesis of glucose from smaller molecules. Pyruvate in the mitochondria is acted upon by pyruvate carboxylase to form oxaloacetate, a citric acid cycle intermediate. In order to get the oxaloacetate out of the mitochondria, malate dehydrogenase reduces it to malate, and it then traverses the inner mitochondrial membrane. Once in the cytosol, the malate is oxidized back to oxaloacetate by cytosolic malate dehydrogenase. Finally, phosphoenolpyruvate carboxykinase (PEPCK) converts oxaloacetate to phosphoenolpyruvate (PEP).

=== Kinetics ===
Kinetic studies show that malate dehydrogenase enzymatic activity is ordered. The cofactor NAD^{+}/NADH is bound to the enzyme before the substrate. The Km value for malate, i.e., the concentration at which the enzyme activity is half-maximal, is 2 mM. The Kcat value is 259.2 s^{−1}.

== Effect of pH on catalytic activity ==
Additionally, pH levels control specificity of substrate binding by malate dehydrogenase due to proton transfer in the catalytic mechanism. A histidine moiety with a pK value of 7.5 has been suggested to play a role in the pH-dependency of the enzyme. Studies have indicated that the binding of the enol form oxaloacetate with the malate dehydrogenase:NADH complex forms much more rapidly at higher pH values. Additionally, L-malate binding to malate dehydrogenase is promoted at alkaline conditions. Consequently, the non-protonated form malate dehydrogenase binds preferentially to L-malate and the enol form of oxaloacetate. In contrast, D-malate, hydroxymalonate, and the keto form of oxaloacetate have been found to bind exclusively to the protonated form of the enzyme. Specifically, when the histidine is protonated, the His residue can form a hydrogen bond with the substrate's carbonyl oxygen, which shifts electron density away from the oxygen and makes it more susceptible to nucleophilic attack by hydride. This promotes the binding of malate dehydrogenase to these substrates. As a result, at lower pH values malate dehydrogenase binds preferentially to D-malate, hydroxymalonate, and keto-oxaloacetate.

== Allosteric regulation ==
Because malate dehydrogenase is closely tied to the citric acid cycle, studies have proposed and experimentally demonstrated that citrate is an allosteric regulator of malate dehydrogenase depending on the concentrations of L-malate and NAD^{+}. This may be due to deviations observed in the kinetic behavior of malate dehydrogenase at high oxaloacetate and L-malate concentrations. Experiments have shown that citrate can both allosterically activate and inhibit the enzymatic activity of malate dehydrogenase. Citrate has been shown to inhibit the oxidation of L-malate when there are low levels of L-malate and NAD^{+}. However, in the presence of high levels of malate and NAD^{+}, citrate can stimulate the production of oxaloacetate. Although malate dehydrogenase is typically considered a reversible enzyme, it is believed that there is an allosteric regulatory site on the enzyme where citrate can bind to and drive the reaction equilibrium in either direction.

Glutamate has also been shown to inhibit malate dehydrogenase activity. Furthermore, it has been shown that alpha ketoglutarate dehydrogenase can interact with mitochondrial aspartate aminotransferase to form a complex, which can then bind to malate dehydrogenase, forming a ternary complex that reverses inhibitory action on malate dehydrogenase enzymatic activity by glutamate. Additionally, the formation of this complex enables glutamate to react with aminotransferase without interfering activity of malate dehydrogenase. The formation of this ternary complex also facilitates the release of oxaloacetate from malate dehydrogenase to aminotransferase. Kinetically, the binding of malate dehydrogenase to the binary complex of alpha ketoglutarate dehydrogenase and aminotrannferase has been shown to increase reaction rate of malate dehydrogenase because the Km of malate dehydrogenase is decreased when it is bound as part of this complex.

== Interactive pathway map ==
Click on genes, proteins and metabolites below to link to respective articles. (Note: The interactive pathway map can be edited at WikiPathways: "GlycolysisGluconeogenesis_WP534".)

Glycolysis and Gluconeogenesis edit
