= PCK1 =

Protein-coding gene in the species Homo sapiens

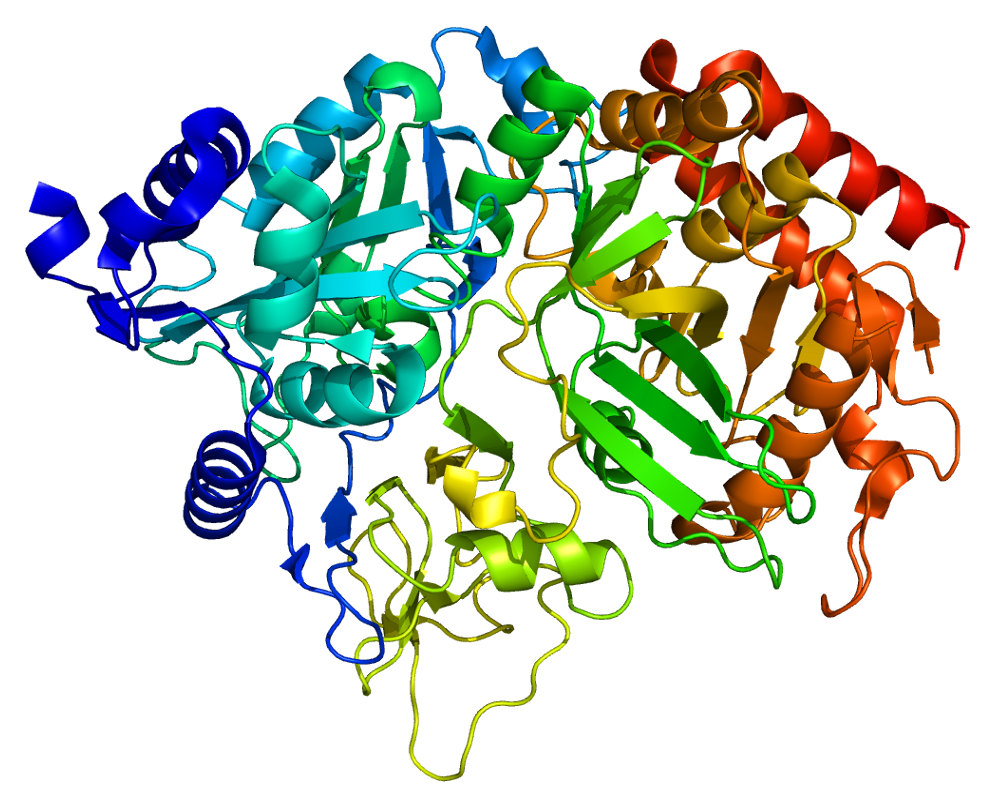

Identifiers
- Aliases: PCK1, PEPCK-C, PEPEPCKC, phosphoenolpyruvate carboxykinase 1, PCKDC
- External IDs: OMIM: 614168; MGI: 97501; GeneCards: PCK1
Available structures
PDB	Ortholog search: PDBe RCSB
PDB	List of PDB id codes 1KHB, 1KHE, 1KHF, 1KHG, 1M51, 1NHX, 2GMV
Enzyme activity
EC #	BRENDA	ExPASy	KEGG	MetaCyc
4.1.1.32	↗	↗	↗	↗

Gene location (Human)
Chr.	Chromosome 20 (human)
Band	20q13.31	Start	57,561,080 bp
Band	20q13.31	End	57,568,121 bp

Gene location (Mouse)
Chr.	Chromosome 2 (mouse)
Band	2 H3|2 95.79 cM	Start	172,994,841 bp
Band	2 H3|2 95.79 cM	End	173,001,066 bp
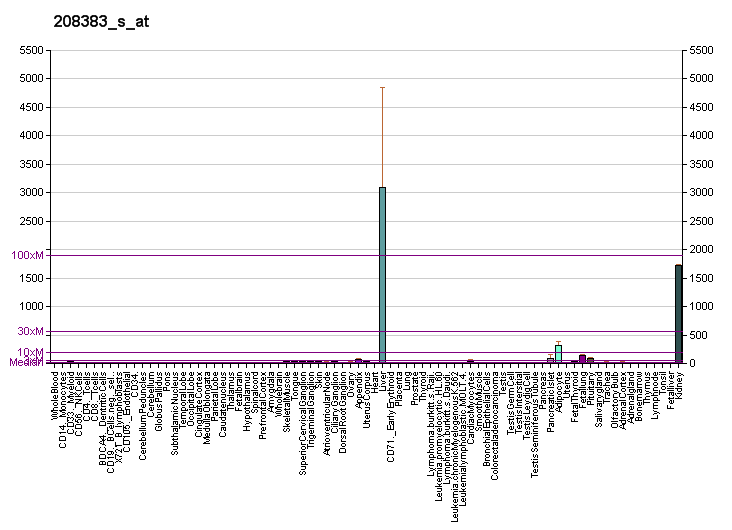
RNA expression pattern
Bgee	Human / Mouse (ortholog); Top expressed in: jejunal mucosa; right lobe of liver; glomerulus; metanephric glomerulus; kidney tubule; human kidney; mucosa of colon; renal medulla; mucosa of sigmoid colon; mucosa of ileum / Top expressed in: right kidney; brown adipose tissue; human kidney; left lobe of liver; white adipose tissue; subcutaneous adipose tissue; tunica adventitia of aorta; intercostal muscle; mammary gland; mesenteric lymph nodes; More reference expression data
BioGPS	More reference expression data
Gene ontology
Molecular function	nucleotide binding; manganese ion binding; GDP binding; phosphoenolpyruvate carboxykinase activity; GTP binding; metal ion binding; carboxylic acid binding; purine nucleotide binding; lyase activity; carboxy-lyase activity; magnesium ion binding; phosphoenolpyruvate carboxykinase (GTP) activity
Cellular component	cytoplasm; cytosol; extracellular exosome
Biological process	glucose homeostasis; internal protein amino acid acetylation; lipid metabolism; response to activity; positive regulation of transcription from RNA polymerase II promoter in response to acidic pH; oxaloacetate metabolic process; response to insulin; glyceroneogenesis; cellular response to potassium ion starvation; cellular response to retinoic acid; response to lipid; cellular response to hypoxia; cellular response to fructose stimulus; response to interleukin-6; glucose metabolic process; ageing; response to methionine; cellular response to interleukin-1; cellular response to glucagon stimulus; cellular response to cAMP; cellular response to insulin stimulus; cellular response to tumor necrosis factor; response to lipopolysaccharide; gluconeogenesis
Sources:Amigo / QuickGO
Orthologs
Databases	NCBI: entry; OMA: entry
Species	Human	Mouse
Entrez	5105	18534
Ensembl	ENSG00000124253	ENSMUSG00000027513
UniProt	P35558	Q9Z2V4
RefSeq (mRNA)	NM_002591	NM_011044
RefSeq (protein)	NP_002582	NP_035174
Location (UCSC)	Chr 20: 57.56 – 57.57 Mb	Chr 2: 172.99 – 173 Mb
PubMed search
- Wikidata
View/Edit Human	View/Edit Mouse

Phosphoenolpyruvate carboxykinase 1 (soluble), also known as PCK1, is an enzyme which in humans is encoded by the PCK1 gene.

== Function ==
This enzyme is a main control point for the regulation of gluconeogenesis. The cytosolic enzyme encoded by this gene, along with GTP, catalyzes the formation of phosphoenolpyruvate from oxaloacetate, with the release of carbon dioxide and GDP. The expression of this gene can be regulated by insulin, glucocorticoids, glucagon, cAMP, and diet. A mitochondrial isozyme of the encoded protein also has been characterized. The gene encoding PCK1 responds to thyroid hormones.

== Interactive pathway map ==
Click on genes, proteins and metabolites below to link to respective articles. (Note: The interactive pathway map can be edited at WikiPathways: "GlycolysisGluconeogenesis_WP534".)

Glycolysis and Gluconeogenesis edit

== See also ==
- PEPCK
