= Malic enzyme 2 =

Enzyme found in humans

ME2
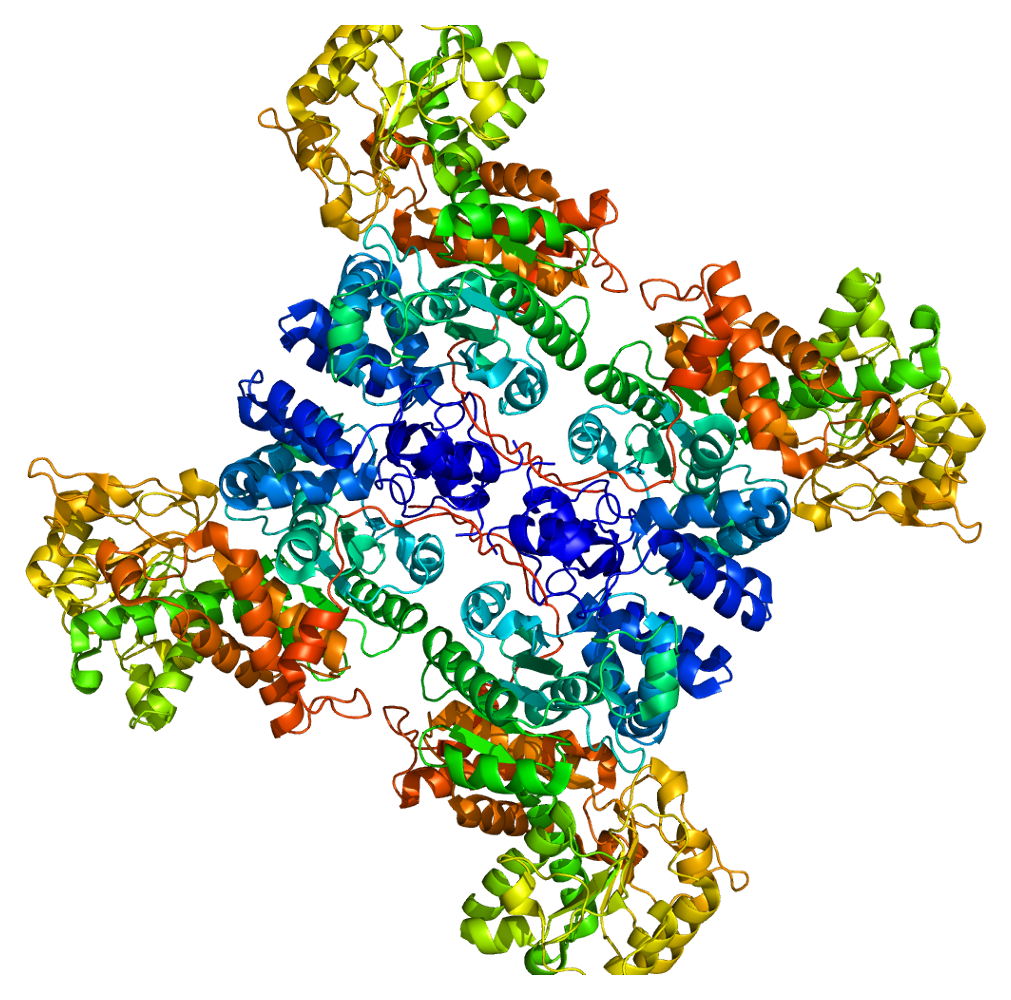

Identifiers
- Aliases: ME2, ODS1, malic enzyme 2
- External IDs: OMIM: 154270; MGI: 2147351; GeneCards: ME2
Available structures
PDB	Ortholog search: PDBe RCSB
PDB	List of PDB id codes 1DO8, 1EFK, 1EFL, 1GZ3, 1GZ4, 1PJ2, 1PJ3, 1PJ4, 1PJL, 1QR6
Enzyme activity
EC #	BRENDA	ExPASy	KEGG	MetaCyc
1.1.1.38	↗	↗	↗	↗

Gene location (Human)
Chr.	Chromosome 18 (human)
Band	18q21.2	Start	50,879,080 bp
Band	18q21.2	End	50,954,257 bp
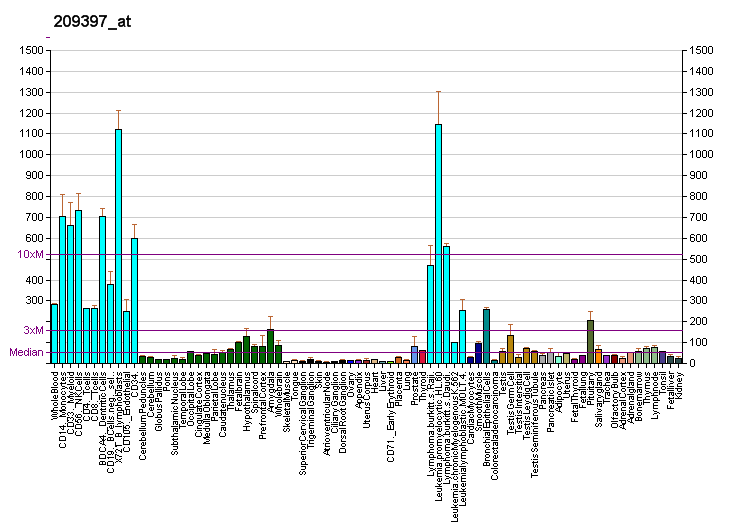

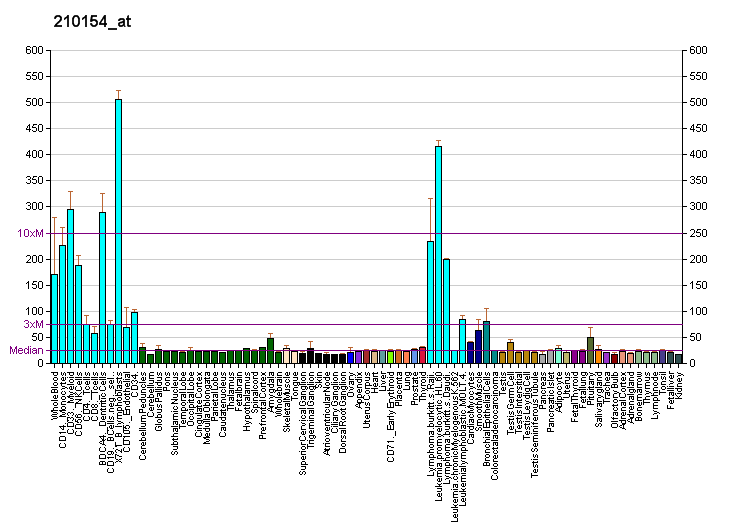

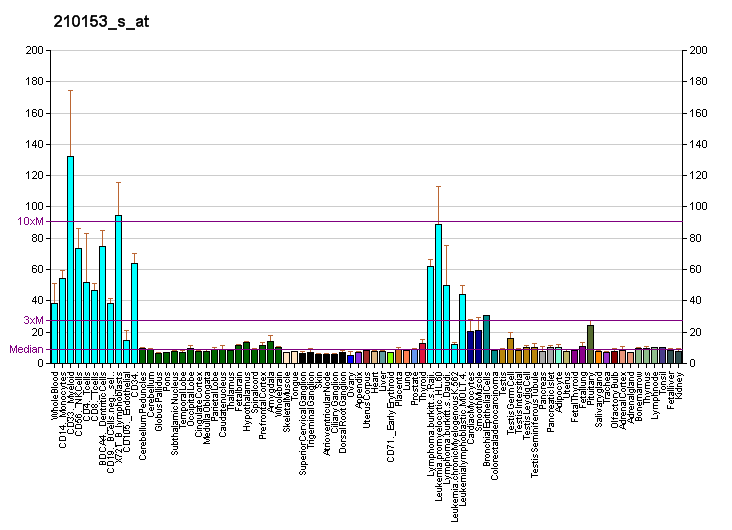
RNA expression pattern
Bgee	Human / Mouse (ortholog); Top expressed in: Epithelium of choroid plexus; jejunal mucosa; cardiac muscle tissue of right atrium; mucosa of colon; mucosa of sigmoid colon; monocyte; duodenum; right ventricle; myocardium of left ventricle; rectum / n/a; More reference expression data
BioGPS	More reference expression data
Gene ontology
Molecular function	malate dehydrogenase (decarboxylating) (NAD+) activity; electron transfer activity; oxidoreductase activity; NAD binding; oxaloacetate decarboxylase activity; catalytic activity; metal ion binding; malic enzyme activity; malate dehydrogenase (decarboxylating) (NADP+) activity
Cellular component	mitochondrion; mitochondrial matrix
Biological process	regulation of NADP metabolic process; metabolism; pyruvate metabolic process; malate metabolic process; electron transport chain; tricarboxylic acid cycle
Sources:Amigo / QuickGO
Orthologs
Databases	NCBI: entry; OMA: entry
Species	Human	Mouse
Entrez	4200	107029
Ensembl	ENSG00000082212	n/a
UniProt	P23368	Q99KE1
RefSeq (mRNA)	NM_001168335; NM_002396	NM_145494
RefSeq (protein)	NP_001161807; NP_002387	NP_663469
Location (UCSC)	Chr 18: 50.88 – 50.95 Mb	n/a
PubMed search
- Wikidata
View/Edit Human	View/Edit Mouse

Malic enzyme 2, also called NAD-dependent malic enzyme, mitochondrial, is an enzyme that in humans is encoded by the ME2 gene. This gene encodes a mitochondrial NAD-dependent malic enzyme, a homotetrameric protein, that catalyzes the oxidative decarboxylation of malate to pyruvate. It had previously been weakly linked to a syndrome known as Friedreich ataxia that has since been shown to be the result of mutation in a completely different gene.
