= Malate dehydrogenase, cytoplasmic =

Enzyme found in humans

MDH1

Identifiers
- Aliases: MDH1, HEL-S-32, MDH-s, MDHA, MGC:1375, MOR2, malate dehydrogenase 1, EIEE88, DEE88, KAR
- External IDs: OMIM: 154200; MGI: 97051; GeneCards: MDH1
Enzyme activity
EC #	BRENDA	ExPASy	KEGG	MetaCyc
1.1.1.37	↗	↗	↗	↗
1.1.1.96	↗	↗	↗	↗

Gene location (Human)
Chr.	Chromosome 2 (human)
Band	2p15	Start	63,588,609 bp
Band	2p15	End	63,607,197 bp

Gene location (Mouse)
Chr.	Chromosome 11 (mouse)
Band	11 A3.1|11 13.89 cM	Start	21,506,692 bp
Band	11 A3.1|11 13.89 cM	End	21,522,367 bp
RNA expression pattern
Bgee	Human / Mouse (ortholog); Top expressed in: lateral nuclear group of thalamus; right ventricle; pons; middle temporal gyrus; Brodmann area 10; orbitofrontal cortex; left ventricle; apex of heart; right auricle of heart; Brodmann area 46 / Top expressed in: medial vestibular nucleus; ventral tegmental area; habenula; mammillary body; dorsal tegmental nucleus; Epithelium of choroid plexus; medial dorsal nucleus; lateral hypothalamus; facial motor nucleus; substantia nigra; More reference expression data
BioGPS	n/a
Gene ontology
Molecular function	malic enzyme activity; oxidoreductase activity, acting on the CH-OH group of donors, NAD or NADP as acceptor; oxidoreductase activity; protein binding; diiodophenylpyruvate reductase activity; malate dehydrogenase activity; NAD binding; catalytic activity; L-malate dehydrogenase activity
Cellular component	extracellular exosome; myelin sheath; extracellular space; cytoplasm; mitochondrion; cytosol
Biological process	gluconeogenesis; NAD metabolic process; carboxylic acid metabolic process; tricarboxylic acid cycle; oxaloacetate metabolic process; malate metabolic process; NADH metabolic process; carbohydrate metabolic process
Sources:Amigo / QuickGO
Orthologs
Databases	NCBI: entry; OMA: entry
Species	Human	Mouse
Entrez	4190	17449
Ensembl	ENSG00000014641	ENSMUSG00000020321
UniProt	P40925	P14152
RefSeq (mRNA)	NM_005917; NM_001199111; NM_001199112; NM_001316374	NM_008618; NM_001316675
RefSeq (protein)	NP_001186040; NP_001186041; NP_001303303; NP_005908	NP_001303604; NP_032644
Location (UCSC)	Chr 2: 63.59 – 63.61 Mb	Chr 11: 21.51 – 21.52 Mb
PubMed search
- Wikidata
View/Edit Human	View/Edit Mouse

Malate dehydrogenase, cytoplasmic also known as malate dehydrogenase 1 is an enzyme that in humans is encoded by the gene MDH1. This enzyme has a role in malate-aspartate shuttle (complementary to the mitochondrial variety MDH2) and so indirectly impacts the citric acid cycle and helps supply NADH for oxidative phosphorylation. In addition to acting on malate (EC 1.1.1.37), this enzyme can also reduce aromatic alpha-keto acids.

== Function ==
Malate dehydrogenase catalyzes the reversible oxidation of malate to oxaloacetate, utilizing the NAD/NADH cofactor system in the citric acid cycle. The protein encoded by this gene is localized to the cytoplasm and may play pivotal roles in the malate-aspartate shuttle that operates in the metabolic coordination between cytosol and mitochondria. Alternatively spliced transcript variants encoding distinct isoforms have been found for this gene.

== Regulation ==
The acetylation of MDH1 activates its enzymatic activity and enhance intracellular levels of NADPH, which promotes adipogenic differentiation.

Methylation on arginine 248 (R248) negatively regulates MDH1. Protein arginine methyltransferase 4 (PRMT4/CARM1) methylates and inhibits MDH1 by disrupting its dimerization. Arginine methylation of MDH1 represses mitochondria respiration and inhibits glutamine utilization. CARM1-mediated MDH1 methylation reduces cellular NADPH level and sensitizes cells to oxidative stress. Besides, MDH1 methylation suppresses cell growth and clonogenic activity. R248 of MDH1 is hypomethylated in pancreatic ductal adenocarcinoma.

== Interactive pathway map ==
Click on genes, proteins and metabolites below to link to respective articles. (Note: The interactive pathway map can be edited at WikiPathways: "GlycolysisGluconeogenesis_WP534".)

Glycolysis and Gluconeogenesis edit
