= Malic enzyme 1 =

Enzyme found in humans

ME1
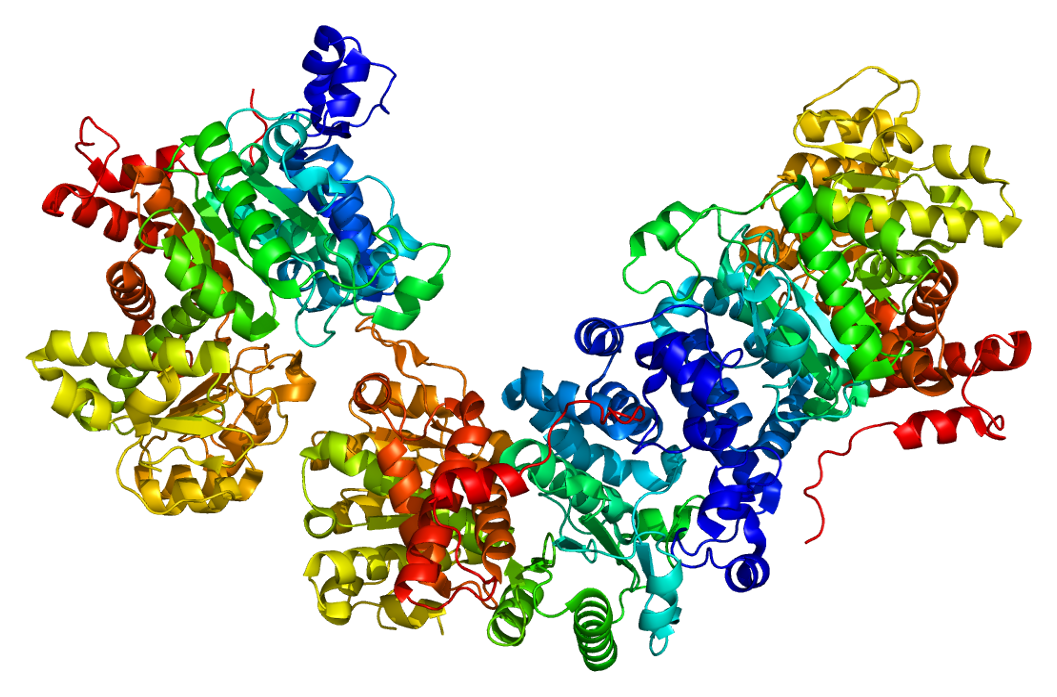

Identifiers
- Aliases: ME1, HUMNDME, MES, malic enzyme 1
- External IDs: OMIM: 154250; MGI: 97043; GeneCards: ME1
Available structures
PDB	Ortholog search: PDBe RCSB
PDB	List of PDB id codes 2AW5, 3WJA
Enzyme activity
EC #	BRENDA	ExPASy	KEGG	MetaCyc
1.1.1.40	↗	↗	↗	↗

Gene location (Human)
Chr.	Chromosome 6 (human)
Band	6q14.2	Start	83,210,402 bp
Band	6q14.2	End	83,431,051 bp

Gene location (Mouse)
Chr.	Chromosome 9 (mouse)
Band	9 E3.1|9 46.58 cM	Start	86,463,424 bp
Band	9 E3.1|9 46.58 cM	End	86,578,006 bp
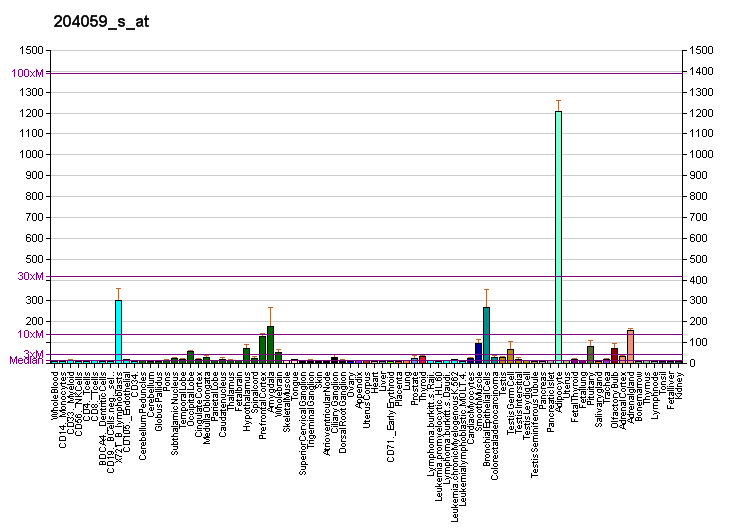

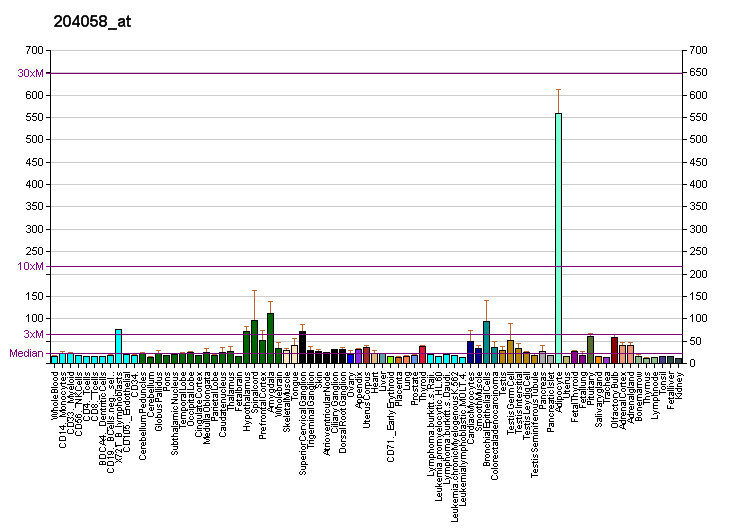
RNA expression pattern
Bgee	Human / Mouse (ortholog); Top expressed in: Skeletal muscle tissue of biceps brachii; spinal ganglia; trigeminal ganglion; pars compacta; skin of thigh; pars reticulata; right adrenal cortex; vulva; gums; gingival epithelium / Top expressed in: adrenal gland; lactiferous gland; tunica adventitia of aorta; mucous cell of stomach; pyloric antrum; right kidney; epithelium of stomach; subcutaneous adipose tissue; brown adipose tissue; zygote; More reference expression data
BioGPS	More reference expression data
Gene ontology
Molecular function	manganese ion binding; ADP binding; NAD binding; metal ion binding; NADP binding; electron transfer activity; malate dehydrogenase (decarboxylating) (NAD+) activity; oxidoreductase activity; oxaloacetate decarboxylase activity; malic enzyme activity; malate dehydrogenase (decarboxylating) (NADP+) activity
Cellular component	cytoplasm; cytosol; mitochondrion
Biological process	regulation of NADP metabolic process; protein tetramerization; NADP biosynthetic process; response to hormone; response to carbohydrate; malate metabolic process; regulation of lipid metabolic process; carbohydrate metabolic process; electron transport chain; pyruvate metabolic process; nucleotide biosynthetic process
Sources:Amigo / QuickGO
Orthologs
Databases	NCBI: entry; OMA: entry
Species	Human	Mouse
Entrez	4199	17436
Ensembl	ENSG00000065833	ENSMUSG00000032418
UniProt	P48163	P06801
RefSeq (mRNA)	NM_002395	NM_001198933; NM_008615
RefSeq (protein)	NP_002386	NP_001185862; NP_032641
Location (UCSC)	Chr 6: 83.21 – 83.43 Mb	Chr 9: 86.46 – 86.58 Mb
PubMed search
- Wikidata
View/Edit Human	View/Edit Mouse

Malic enzyme 1, sometimes ambiguously called NADP-dependent malic enzyme, is an enzyme that in humans is encoded by the gene ME1. In humans, it functions as the cytoplasmic variety of malate dehydrogenase (oxaloacetate-decarboxylating) (NADP+) (EC 1.1.1.40).

This gene encodes a cytosolic, NADP-dependent enzyme that generates NADPH for fatty acid biosynthesis. The activity of this enzyme, the reversible oxidative decarboxylation of malate to pyruvate, links the glycolytic and citric acid cycles. The regulation of expression for this gene is complex. Increased expression can result from elevated levels of thyroid hormones or by higher proportions of carbohydrates in the diet.
