= Malate dehydrogenase (decarboxylating) =

Class of enzymes found in plants

NAD-malic enzyme
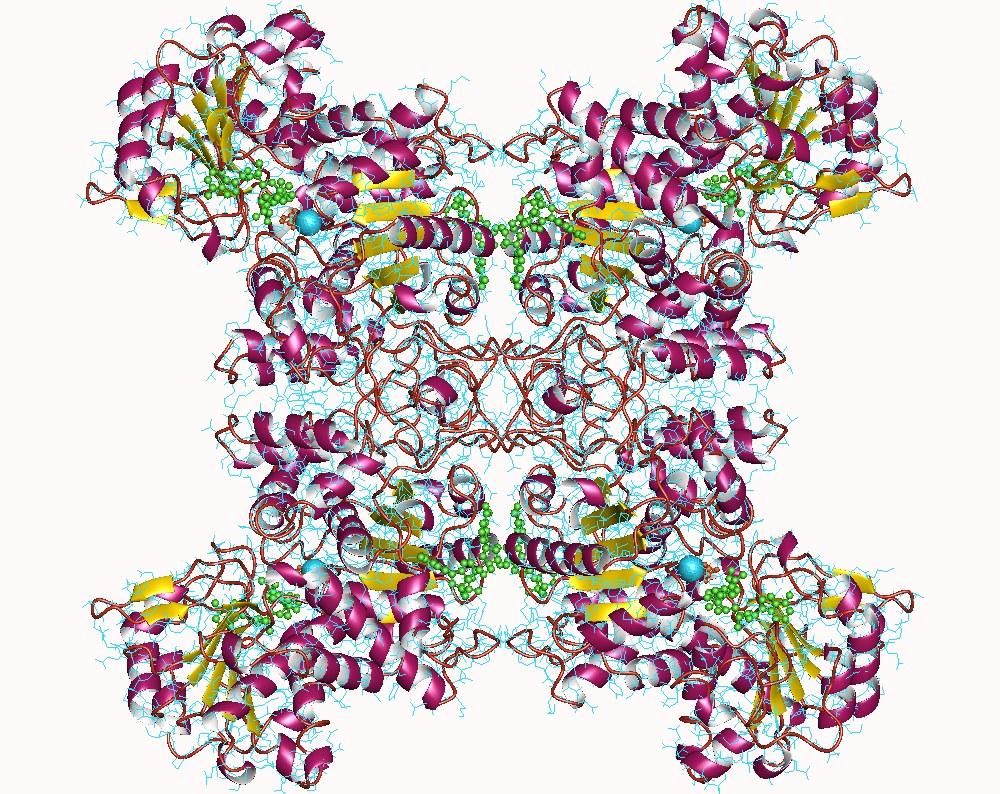
- malic enzyme tetramer, Human

Identifiers
- EC no.: 1.1.1.39
- CAS no.: 9028-46-0

Databases
- BRENDA: enzyme data
- ExPASy: NiceZyme view
- KEGG: enzyme entry
- MetaCyc: metabolic pathway
- Rhea: reactions
- PDB structures: RCSB PDB PDBe PDBsum
- Gene Ontology: AmiGO / QuickGO
Search
- PMC: articles
- PubMed: articles
- NCBI: proteins

Malate dehydrogenases (decarboxylating) (EC 1.1.1.39) or NAD-malic enzymes (NAD-ME) are a type of enzyme found in plants that catalyze the chemical reaction

(S)-Malic acid
+ NAD^{+}
H^{+}
H^{+}
Pyruvic acid
+ CO_{2} + NADH

The two substrates of this enzyme are (S)-malic acid and oxidised nicotinamide adenine dinucleotide (NAD^{+}). Its products are pyruvic acid, carbon dioxide, and reduced NADH.

This enzyme belongs to the family of oxidoreductases, to be specific, those acting on the CH-OH group of donor with NAD^{+} or NADP^{+} as acceptor. The systematic name of this enzyme class is (S)-malate:NAD^{+} oxidoreductase (decarboxylating). This enzyme participates in pyruvate metabolism and carbon fixation. NAD-malic enzyme is one of three decarboxylation enzymes used in the inorganic carbon concentrating mechanisms of C_{4} and CAM plants. The others are NADP-malic enzyme and PEP carboxykinase.

== See also ==
- Malate dehydrogenase (oxaloacetate-decarboxylating) which performs the same reaction
