= Malate dehydrogenase (oxaloacetate-decarboxylating) (NADP+) =

Class of enzymes

NADP-malic enzyme

Identifiers
- EC no.: 1.1.1.40
- CAS no.: 9028-47-1

Databases
- BRENDA: enzyme data
- ExPASy: NiceZyme view
- KEGG: enzyme entry
- MetaCyc: metabolic pathway
- Rhea: reactions
- PDB structures: RCSB PDB PDBe PDBsum
- Gene Ontology: AmiGO / QuickGO
Search
- PMC: articles
- PubMed: articles
- NCBI: proteins

Malate dehydrogenases (oxaloacetate-decarboxylating) (NADP^{+}) (EC 1.1.1.40) or NADP-malic enzymes (NADP-ME) are a type of enzyme that catalyze the following chemical reaction in the presence of a bivalent metal ion:

(S)-Malic acid
+ NADP^{+}
H^{+}
H^{+}
Pyruvic acid
+ CO_{2} + NADPH

The two substrates of this enzyme are (S)-malic acid and oxidised nicotinamide adenine dinucleotide phosphate (NADP^{+}). its products are pyruvic acid, carbon dioxide, and reduced NADPH.

This enzyme belongs to the family of oxidoreductases, to be specific those acting on the CH-OH group of donor with NAD^{+} or NADP^{+} as acceptor. The systematic name of this enzyme class is (S)-malate:NADP^{+} oxidoreductase (oxaloacetate-decarboxylating). This enzyme participates in pyruvate metabolism and carbon fixation. NADP-malic enzyme is one of three decarboxylation enzymes used in the inorganic carbon concentrating mechanisms of C4 and CAM plants. The others are NAD-malic enzyme and PEP carboxykinase. Although often one of the three photosynthetic decarboxylases predominate, the simultaneous operation of all three is also shown to exist.

== Enzyme structure ==
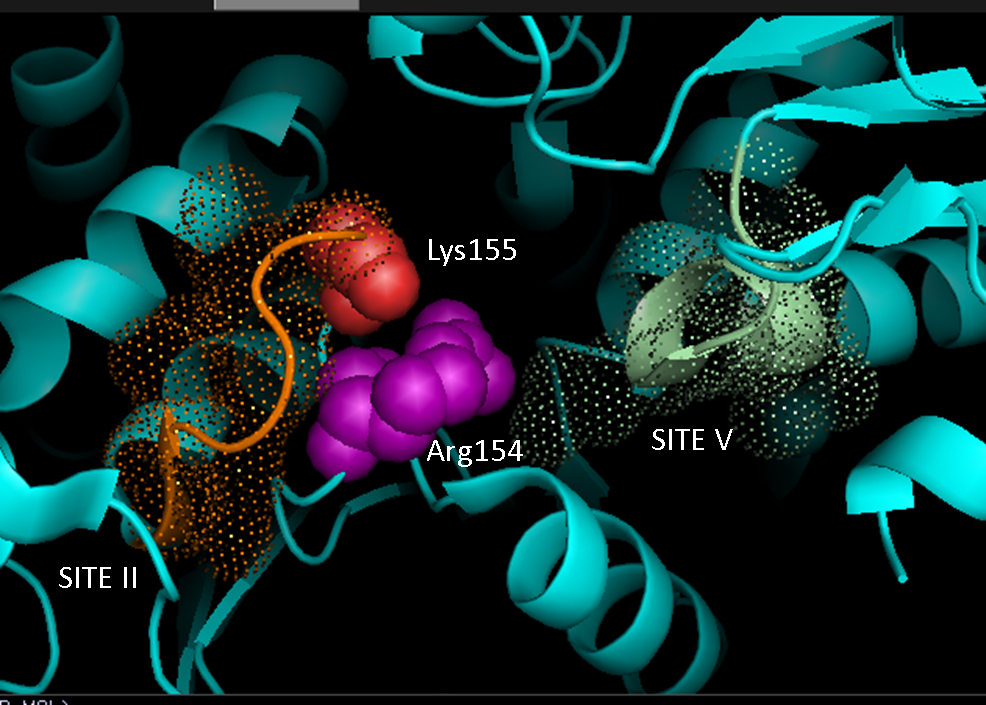
Crystal structure of a homologous human malic enzyme highlights key residues involved in substrate binding and catalysis. Site II contains the GLGDLG motif, site V contains the other GXGXXG motif, the highlighted arginine residue interacts with both NADP^{+} and malate, and the highlighted lysine may possibly be involved in base catalysis. PDB file identity for image is 2aw5.

Based on crystallography data of homologous NADP-dependent malic enzymes of mammalian origin, a 3D model for C_{4} pathway NADP-ME in plants has been developed, identifying the key residues involved in substrate-binding or catalysis. Dinucleotide binding involves two glycine-rich GXGXXG motifs, a hydrophobic groove involving at least six amino acid residues, and a negatively charged residue at the end of the βB-strand. The primary sequence of the first motif, ^{240}GLGDLG^{245}, is a consensus marker for phosphate binding, evidencing involvement with NADP binding, while the other glycine rich motif adopts a classical Rossmann fold—also a typical marker for NADP cofactor binding. Mutagenesis experiments in maize NADP-ME have supported the current model. Valine substitution for glycine in either motif region rendered the enzyme completely inactive while spectral analysis indicated no major changes from wild-type form. The data is suggestive of direct impairment at a key residue involved in binding or catalysis rather than an inter-domain residue influencing conformational stability. Additionally, a key arginine residue at site 237 has been shown to interact both with malate and NADP^{+} substrates, forming key favorable electrostatic interactions to the negatively charged carboxylic-acid and phosphate group respectively. Elucidation of whether the residue plays a role in substrate binding or substrate positioning for catalysis has yet to be determined. Lysine residue 255 has been implicated as a catalytic base for the enzymes reactivity; however, further studies are still required to conclusively establish its biochemical role.

=== Structural studies ===
As of 2007, 3 structures have been solved for this class of enzymes, with PDB accession codes PDB: 1GQ2, PDB: 1GZ4, and PDB: 2AW5.

== Biological function ==
In a broader context, malic enzymes are found within a wide range of eukaryotic organisms, from fungi to mammals, and beyond that, are shown to localize in range of subcellular locations, including the cytosol, mitochondria, and chloroplast. C_{4} NADP-ME, specifically, is in plants localized in bundle sheath chloroplasts.

During C_{4} photosynthesis, an evolved pathway to increase localized CO_{2} concentrations under the threat of enhanced photorespiration, CO_{2} is captured within mesophyll cells, fixed as oxaloacetate, converted into malate and released internally within bundle sheath cells to directly feed RuBisCO activity. This release of fixed CO_{2}, triggered by the favorable decarboxylation of malate into pyruvate, is mediated by NADP-dependent malic enzyme. In fact, the significance of NADP-ME activity in CO_{2} conservation is evidenced by a study performed with transgenic plants exhibiting a NADP-ME loss of function mutation. Plants with the mutation experienced 40% the activity of wild-type NADP-ME and achieved significantly reduced CO_{2} uptake even at high intercellular levels of CO_{2}, evidencing the biological importance of NADP-ME at regulating carbon flux towards the Calvin cycle.

== Enzyme regulation ==
NADP-ME expression has been shown to be regulated by abiotic stress factors. For CAM plants, drought conditions cause stoma to largely remain shut to avoid water loss by evapotranspiration, which leads to CO_{2} starvation. In compensation, closed stoma activates the translation of NADP-ME to reinforce high efficiency of CO_{2} assimilation during the brief intervals of CO_{2} intake, allowing for carbon fixation to continue.

In addition to regulation at the longer time scale by means of expression control, regulation at the short-time scale can occur through allosteric mechanisms. C_{4} NADP-ME has been shown to be partially inhibited by its substrate, malate, suggesting two independent binding sites: one at the active site and one at an allosteric site. However, the inhibitory effect exhibits pH-dependence – existent at a pH of 7 but not a pH of 8. The control of enzyme activity due to pH changes align with the hypothesis that NADP-ME is most active while photosynthesis is in progress: Active light reactions leads to a rise in basicity within the chloroplast stroma, the location of NADP-ME, leading to a diminished inhibitory effect of malate on NADP-ME and thereby promoting a more active state. Conversely, slowed light reactions leads to a rise in acidity within the stroma, promoting the inhibition of NADP-ME by malate. Because the high energy products of the light reactions, NADPH and ATP, are required for the Calvin cycle to proceed, a buildup of CO_{2} without them is not useful, explaining the need for the regulatory mechanism.

This protein may use the morpheein model of allosteric regulation.

== Evolution ==
NADP-malic enzyme, as all other C_{4} decarboxylases, did not evolve de novo for CO_{2} pooling to aid RuBisCO. Rather, NADP-ME was directly transformed from a C_{3} species in photosynthesis, and even earlier origins from an ancient cystolic ancestor. In the cytosol, the enzyme existed as a series of housekeeping isoforms purposed towards a variety of functions including malate level maintenance during hypoxia, microspore separation, and pathogen defense. In regards to the mechanism of evolution, the C_{4} functionality is thought to have stemmed from gene duplication error both within promoter regions, triggering overexpression in bundle-sheath cells, and within the coding region, generating neofunctionalization. Selection for CO_{2} preservation function as well as enhanced water and nitrogen utilization under stressed conditions was then shaped by natural pressures.

== See also ==
- Malate dehydrogenase (oxaloacetate-decarboxylating) which catalyses the same reaction using NAD^{+} as oxidising agent
- ME1 (human gene)
