= Malate dehydrogenase (quinone) =

Class of enzymes found in bacteria and protozoa

malate dehydrogenase (quinone)

Identifiers
- EC no.: 1.1.5.4
- CAS no.: 71822-24-7

Databases
- BRENDA: enzyme data
- ExPASy: NiceZyme view
- KEGG: enzyme entry
- MetaCyc: metabolic pathway
- Rhea: reactions
- PDB structures: RCSB PDB PDBe PDBsum
- Gene Ontology: AmiGO / QuickGO
Search
- PMC: articles
- PubMed: articles
- NCBI: proteins

Malate dehydrogenases (quinone) (EC 1.1.5.4), formerly malate dehydrogenases (acceptor) (EC 1.1.99.16), are a type of enzyme found in bacteria and protozoa that catalyze the chemical reaction

(S)-malic acid
+ a quinone
oxaloacetic acid
+ a quinol

The two substrates of this enzyme are (S)-malic acid and a quinone. Its products are oxaloacetic acid and reduced quinone. The cofactor can be a variety of quinones including vitamin K.

This enzyme belongs to the family of oxidoreductases, specifically those acting on the CH-OH group of donor with a quinone as acceptor. The systematic name of this enzyme class is (S)-malate:quinone oxidoreductase. Other names in common use include FAD-dependent malate-vitamin K reductase, malate-vitamin K reductase, and (S)-malate:(quinone) oxidoreductase. This enzyme participates in pyruvate metabolism. It employs one cofactor, FAD.
