= Malate dehydrogenase, mitochondrial =

Kreb cycle enzyme that oxidizes malate to oxaloacetate

MDH2
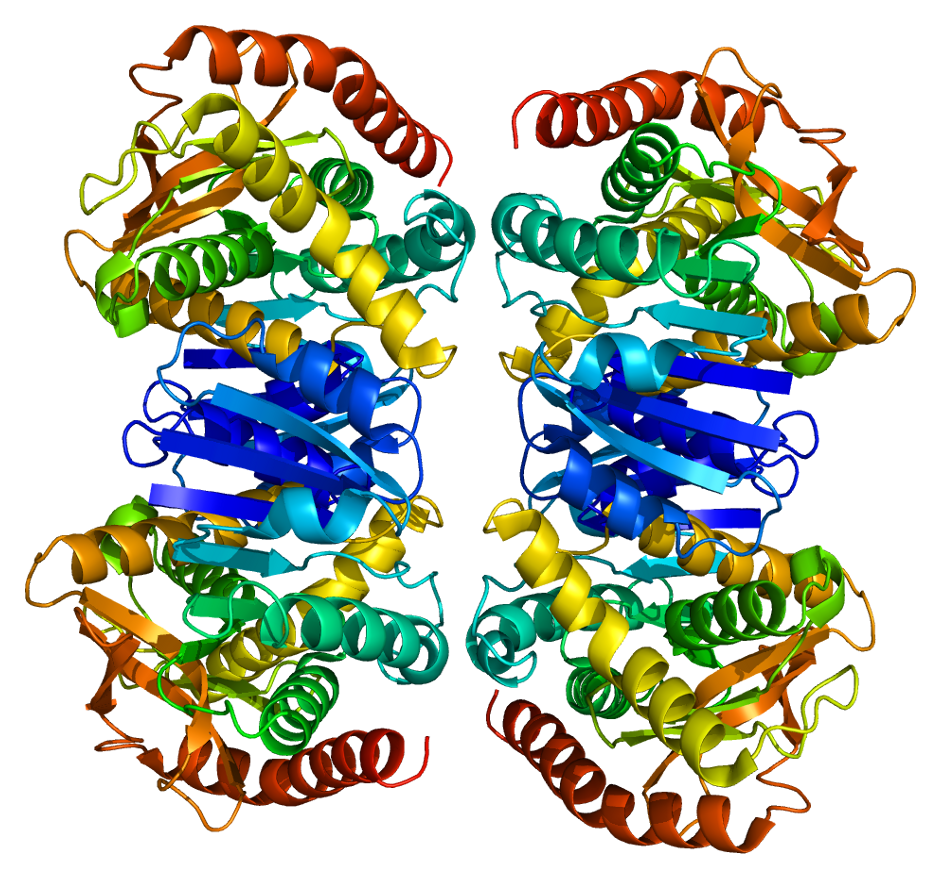

Identifiers
- Aliases: MDH2, M-MDH, MDH, MGC:3559, MOR1, Malate dehydrogenase 2, EIEE51, DEE51
- External IDs: OMIM: 154100; MGI: 97050; GeneCards: MDH2
Available structures
PDB	Ortholog search: PDBe RCSB
PDB	List of PDB id codes 2DFD, 4WLE, 4WLO, 4WLV, 4WLN, 4WLU, 4WLF
Enzyme activity
EC #	BRENDA	ExPASy	KEGG	MetaCyc
1.1.1.37	↗	↗	↗	↗

Gene location (Human)
Chr.	Chromosome 7 (human)
Band	7q11.23	Start	76,048,051 bp
Band	7q11.23	End	76,067,508 bp

Gene location (Mouse)
Chr.	Chromosome 5 (mouse)
Band	5 G2|5 75.4 cM	Start	135,807,334 bp
Band	5 G2|5 75.4 cM	End	135,819,252 bp
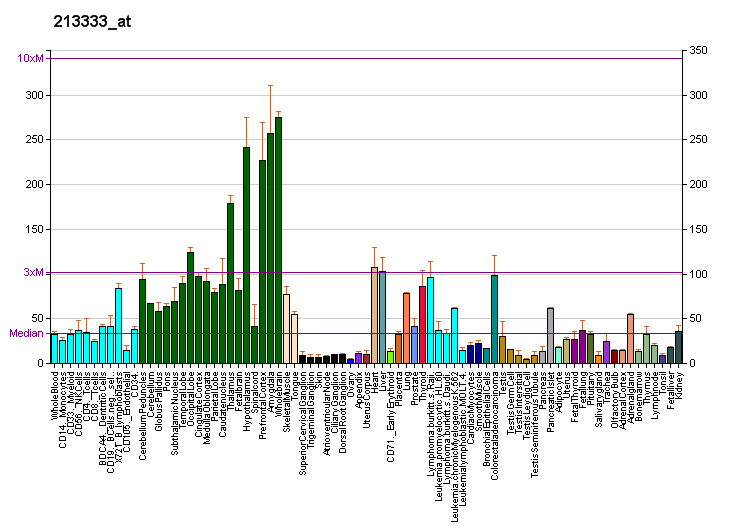

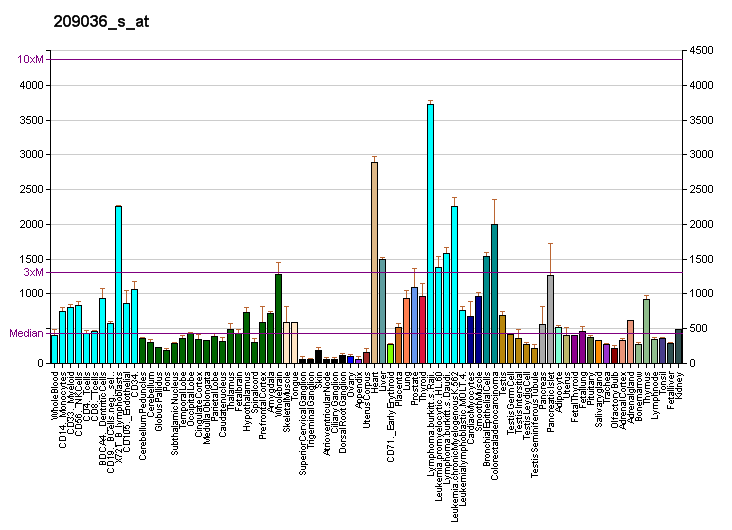
RNA expression pattern
Bgee	Human / Mouse (ortholog); Top expressed in: body of tongue; right ventricle; beta cell; Skeletal muscle tissue of rectus abdominis; gastrocnemius muscle; mucosa of pharynx; biceps brachii; Skeletal muscle tissue of biceps brachii; muscle of thigh; human penis / Top expressed in: plantaris muscle; extensor digitorum longus muscle; digastric muscle; cardiac muscle tissue of left ventricle; sternocleidomastoid muscle; right ventricle; temporal muscle; extraocular muscle; interventricular septum; duodenum; More reference expression data
BioGPS	More reference expression data
Gene ontology
Molecular function	oxidoreductase activity, acting on the CH-OH group of donors, NAD or NADP as acceptor; malate dehydrogenase activity; protein self-association; catalytic activity; L-malate dehydrogenase activity; oxidoreductase activity; malate dehydrogenase (NADP+) activity; RNA binding
Cellular component	membrane; myelin sheath; mitochondrial matrix; mitochondrion; mitochondrial inner membrane; extracellular exosome; nucleus; cytoplasm
Biological process	gluconeogenesis; malate metabolic process; carboxylic acid metabolic process; internal protein amino acid acetylation; tricarboxylic acid cycle; oxaloacetate metabolic process; NADH metabolic process; aerobic dissimilation; carbohydrate metabolic process
Sources:Amigo / QuickGO
Orthologs
Databases	NCBI: entry; OMA: entry
Species	Human	Mouse
Entrez	4191	17448
Ensembl	ENSG00000146701	ENSMUSG00000019179
UniProt	P40926	P08249
RefSeq (mRNA)	NM_001282403; NM_001282404; NM_005918	NM_008617
RefSeq (protein)	NP_001269332; NP_001269333; NP_005909	NP_032643
Location (UCSC)	Chr 7: 76.05 – 76.07 Mb	Chr 5: 135.81 – 135.82 Mb
PubMed search
- Wikidata
View/Edit Human	View/Edit Mouse

Malate dehydrogenase, mitochondrial, also known as malate dehydrogenase 2, is an enzyme that in humans is encoded by the MDH2 gene. Mitochondrial malate dehydrogenase is a core enzyme in the citric acid cycle that converts malate into oxaloacetate. It also has additional functions such as working with cytoplasmic malate dehydrogenase (MDH1) as part of the malate-aspartate shuttle and binding to mRNAs and tRNAs.

Malate dehydrogenase catalyzes the reversible oxidation of malate to oxaloacetate, utilizing the NAD/NADH cofactor system in the citric acid cycle. The protein encoded by this gene is localized to the mitochondria and may play pivotal roles in the malate-aspartate shuttle that operates in the metabolic coordination between cytosol and mitochondria.

== Structure ==
The protein encoded by MDH2 exists as a dimer, which indicate the important connection between protein stability and enzymatic activity. Each subunit contains two structurally and functionally distinct domains. The first is the NAD-binding domain, which exists in the amino-terminal half of each molecule, and contains a parallel-sheet structure, otherwise known as a Rosman fold motif. The core dinucleotide binding structure is composed of four beta-sheets and one alpha-helix. The other domain is a carboxy-terminal domain that contains the substrate binding site and amino acids that are necessary for catalysis. The active site of these enzymes is in a cleft between two domains. Crystallography reveals the dimer interface, which consists mainly of interacting alpha-helices that form a compact interaction. The active sites in these dimeric proteins are well separated from each other. The active site is conserved across both human MDH isoforms, with the substrates being bound by a histidine, asparagine, and three arginine residues.

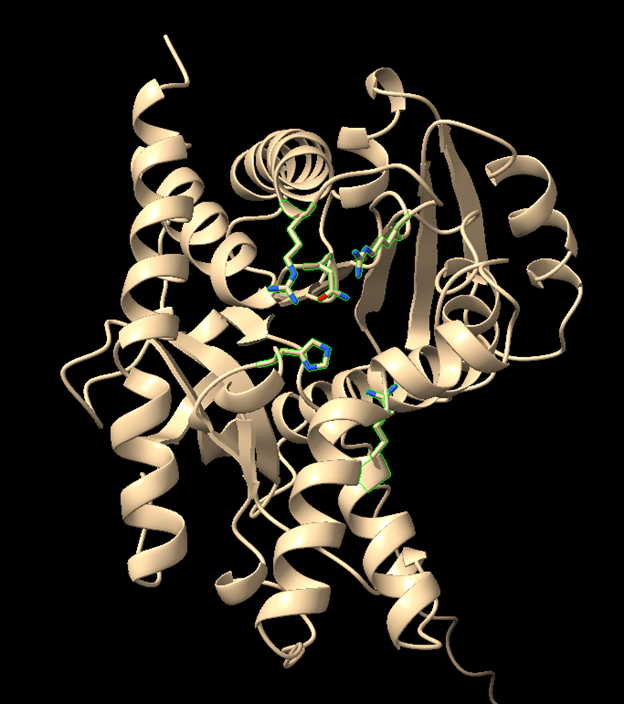
Human mitochondrial malate dehydrogenase from AlphaFold (AF-P40926-F1-v4). Highlighted residues Arg 104, Arg 110, Asn 142, Arg 176, His 200. These residues are involved in hydrogen bonding with substrates like citrate and L-malate.

== Function ==
Because malate dehydrogenase is closely tied to the citric acid cycle, regulation is highly dependent on TCA products. Citrate also affects MDH activity by very complex manner. It inhibits the reduction of oxaloacetate under all conditions. Citrate also inhibits malate oxidation, but only at low malate or NAD concentrations. While citrate shares similar hydrogen bonding patterns with oxaloacetate, the presence of an additional carboxyl group results in competitive inhibition with respect to NADH that could be the result of introduced steric hindrance with the nicotinamide ring of the cofactor. When both malate and NAD concentrations are high (10 mmol/L and 5 mmol/L, respectively), citrate can actually augment MDH2 activity. All three effectors (malate, oxaloacetate and citrate) bind to the same putative allosteric site. MDH2 has also been shown to be competitively inhibited by ATP and adenosine nucleotides in general. By occupying the Rossman fold domain, they prevent the binding of NAD/NADH while also stabilizing the dimer structure over the catalytically preferred tetramer structure. Recent studies of mitochondrial malate dehydrogenase are focused into the nature of the inactivation processes. The oligomeric structure of MDH2 has a variety of biological implications. Some researches have suggested that the dimeric structure is critical for enzymatic activity. It was first proposed that the reciprocating compulsory ordered mechanism where each subunit alternates as the active and the helper subunit, but both are needed for activity. This mechanism predicts an inactive monomer, and was corroborated by studies that showed a dramatic reduction of enzymatic activity. Studies with mitochondrial MDH2 have shown that this enzyme is allosterically regulated as a complex as well. Binding experiments indicate that mitochondrial aspartate aminotransferase can associate with the alpha-ketoglutarate dehydrogenase complex and that mitochondrial malate dehydrogenase can associate with this binary complex to form a ternary complex. Formation of this ternary complex enables low levels of the alpha-ketoglutarate dehydrogenase complex, in the presence of the aminotransferase, to reverse inhibition of malate oxidation by glutamate. Thus, glutamate can react with the aminotransferase in this complex without glutamate inhibiting production of oxaloacetate by the malate dehydrogenase in the complex. The conversion of glutamate to alpha-ketoglutarate could also be facilitated because in the trienzyme complex, oxaloacetate might be directly transferred from malate dehydrogenase to the aminotransferase. In addition, association of malate dehydrogenase with these other two enzymes enhances malate dehydrogenase activity due to a marked decrease in the Km of malate. The potential ability of the aminotransferase to transfer directly alpha-ketoglutarate to the alpha-ketoglutarate dehydrogenase complex in this multienzyme system plus the ability of succinyl-CoA, a product of this transfer, to inhibit citrate synthase could play a role in preventing alpha-ketoglutarate and citrate from accumulating in high levels. This would maintain the catalytic activity of the multienzyme system because alpha-ketoglutarate and citrate allosterically inhibit malate dehydrogenase and dissociate this enzyme from the multienzyme system.

== Clinical significance ==
Mutations in the MDH2 gene have been associated with several cancers, including uterine cancer, prostate cancer, pheochromocytoma and other paragangliomas. In particular, MDH2 has been found to be overexpressed in doxorubicin-resistant uterine cancer cells and may contribute to drug resistance. Since MDH2 plays a major role in malate-aspartate shuttling in ATP production, its overexpression likely supplies additional energy for P-glycoprotein to pump chemotherapeutic drugs out of the cells. Likewise, MDH2 contributes to docetaxel resistance in prostate cancer cells via the JNK pathway, and its knockdown reduced ATP levels as well as increased drug sensitivity. Thus, MDH2 may be an effective therapeutic target to enhance drug treatments for cancer.

== Interactive pathway map ==
Click on genes, proteins and metabolites below to link to respective articles. (Note: The interactive pathway map can be edited at WikiPathways: "TCACycle_WP78".)
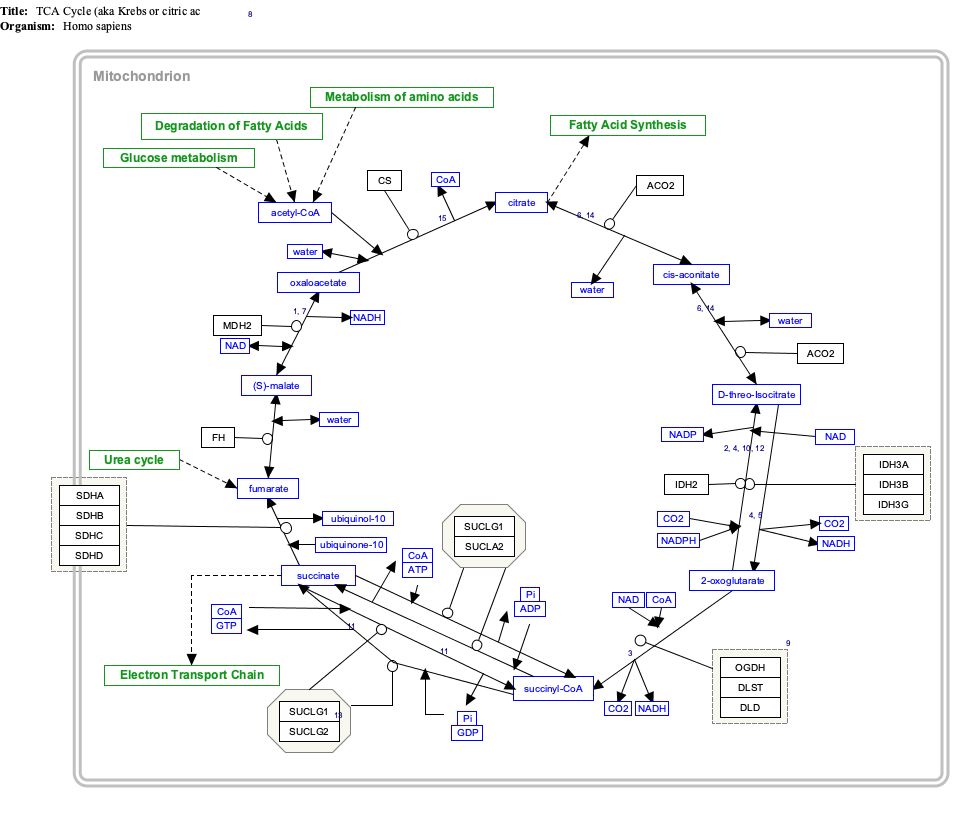

TCACycle_WP78 edit
Click on genes, proteins and metabolites below to link to respective articles. (Note: The interactive pathway map can be edited at WikiPathways: "GlycolysisGluconeogenesis_WP534".)

Glycolysis and Gluconeogenesis edit

== See also ==
- Malate dehydrogenase
