= D-malate dehydrogenase (decarboxylating) =

Enzyme

Identifiers
- EC no.: 1.1.1.83
- CAS no.: 37250-20-7

Databases
- BRENDA: enzyme data
- ExPASy: NiceZyme view
- KEGG: enzyme entry
- MetaCyc: metabolic pathway
- Rhea: reactions
- PDB structures: RCSB PDB PDBe PDBsum
- Gene Ontology: AmiGO / QuickGO
Search
- PMC: articles
- PubMed: articles
- NCBI: proteins

D-malate dehydrogenases (decarboxylating) (EC 1.1.1.83) are a type of enzyme found in bacteria and archaea that catalyze the chemical reaction

D-Malic acid
+ NAD^{+}
H^{+}
H^{+}
Pyruvic acid
+ CO_{2} + NADH

The two substrates of this enzyme are D-malic acid and oxidised nicotinamide adenine dinucleotide (NAD^{+}). Its products are pyruvic acid, carbon dioxide, reduced NADH, and a proton.

This enzyme belongs to the family of oxidoreductases, specifically those acting on the CH-OH group of a donor with NAD^{+} or NADP^{+} as acceptor. The systematic name of this enzyme class is (R)-malate:NAD^{+} oxidoreductase (decarboxylating). Other names in common use include D-malate dehydrogenase, D-malic enzyme, bifunctional L(+)-tartrate dehydrogenase-D(+)-malate (decarboxylating). This enzyme participates in butanoate metabolism.
