= Malate dehydrogenase (NADP+) =

Class of light-sensitive plant enzymes

malate dehydrogenase (NADP^{+})
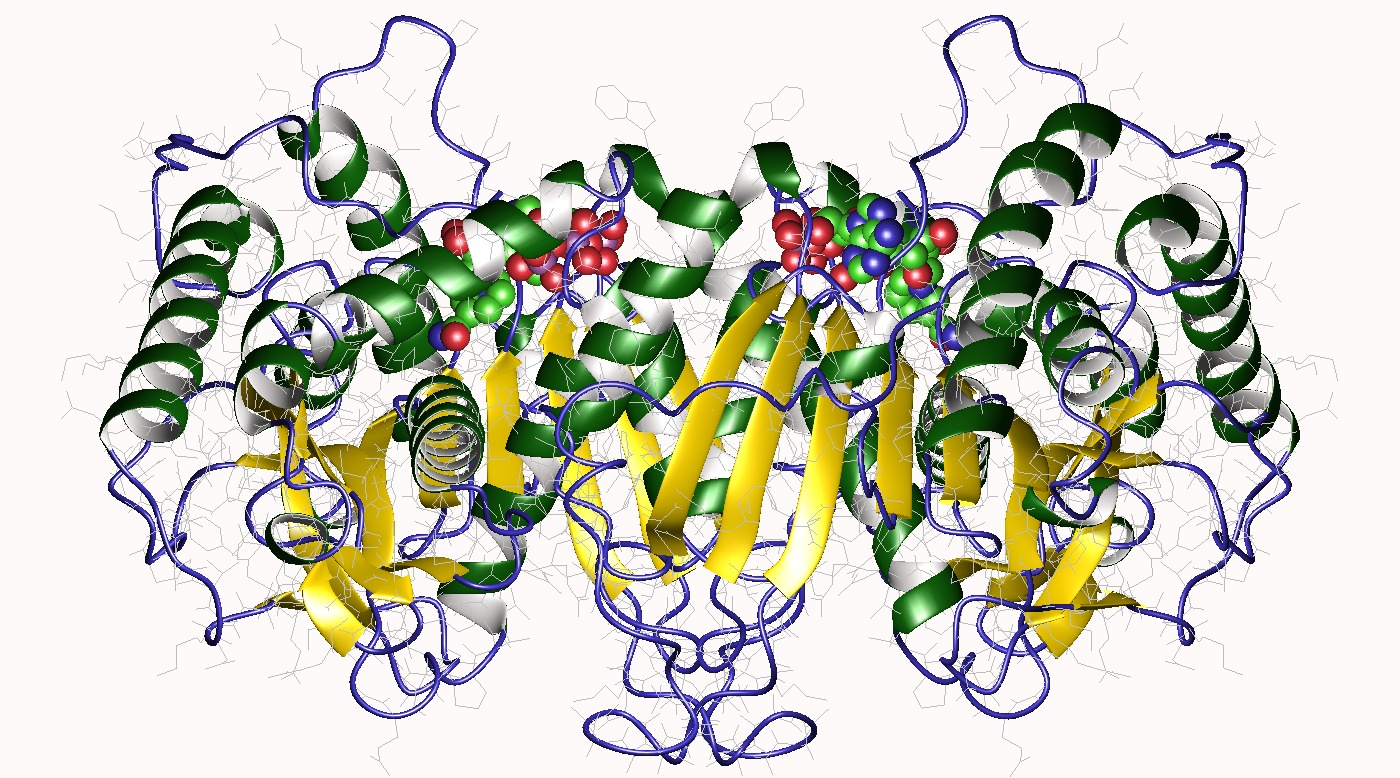
- Malate dehydrogenase (NADP^{+}) homodimer, Flaveria bidentis

Identifiers
- EC no.: 1.1.1.82
- CAS no.: 37250-19-4

Databases
- BRENDA: enzyme data
- ExPASy: NiceZyme view
- KEGG: enzyme entry
- MetaCyc: metabolic pathway
- Rhea: reactions
- PDB structures: RCSB PDB PDBe PDBsum
- Gene Ontology: AmiGO / QuickGO
Search
- PMC: articles
- PubMed: articles
- NCBI: proteins

Malate dehydrogenases (NADP^{+}) (EC 1.1.1.82) are a type of light-sensitive enzyme found in plants that catalyze the chemical reaction

(S)-malic acid
+ NADP^{+}
H^{+}
H^{+}
oxaloacetic acid
+ NADPH

The two substrates of this enzyme are (S)-malic acid and oxidised nicotinamide adenine dinucleotide phosphate (NADP^{+}). Its products are oxaloacetic acid, NADPH, and a proton.

This enzyme belongs to the family of oxidoreductases, specifically those acting on the CH-OH group of donor with NAD^{+} or NADP^{+} as acceptor. The systematic name of this enzyme class is (S)-malate:NADP^{+} oxidoreductase. Other names in common use include NADP^{+}-malic enzyme, NADP^{+}-malate dehydrogenase, malic dehydrogenase (nicotinamide adenine dinucleotide phosphate), malate NADP^{+} dehydrogenase, NADP^{+} malate dehydrogenase, NADP^{+}-linked malate dehydrogenase, and malate dehydrogenase (NADP^{+}). This enzyme participates in pyruvate metabolism and carbon fixation. This enzyme has at least one effector, hn.

== Structural studies ==
As of late 2007, two structures have been solved for this class of enzymes, with PDB accession codes PDB: 1CIV and PDB: 7MDH.
