= Malate dehydrogenase (oxaloacetate-decarboxylating) =

Class of enzymes

malate dehydrogenase (oxaloacetate-decarboxylating)
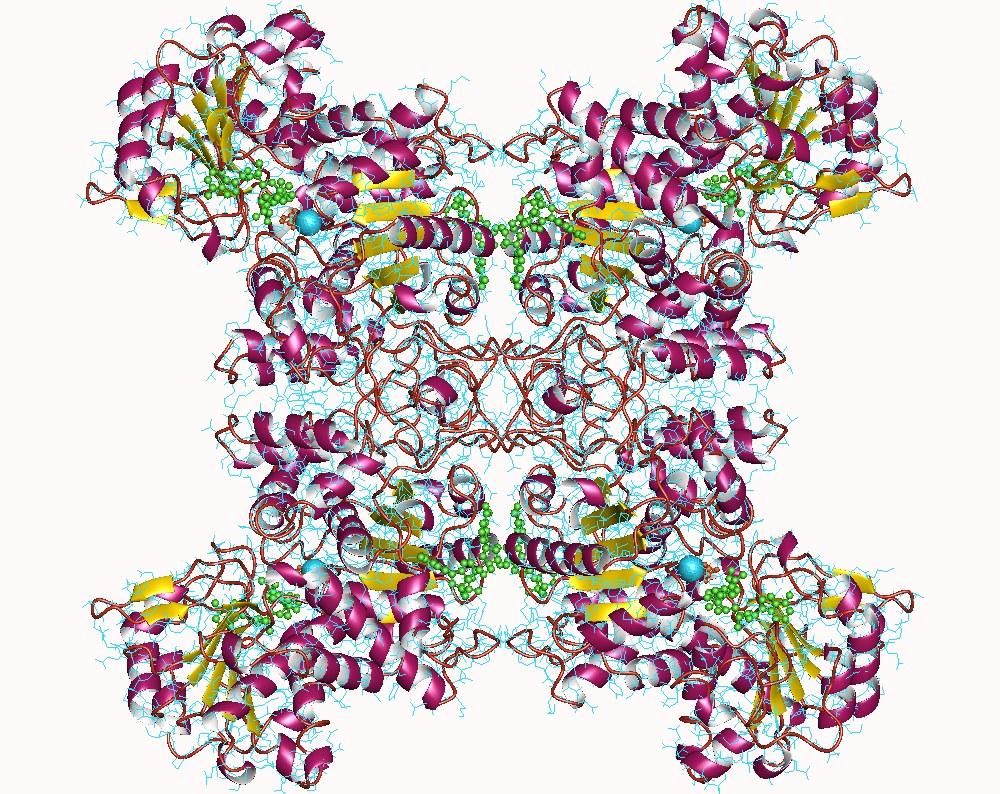
- malic enzyme tetramer, Human

Identifiers
- EC no.: 1.1.1.38
- CAS no.: 9080-52-8

Databases
- BRENDA: enzyme data
- ExPASy: NiceZyme view
- KEGG: enzyme entry
- MetaCyc: metabolic pathway
- Rhea: reactions
- PDB structures: RCSB PDB PDBe PDBsum
- Gene Ontology: AmiGO / QuickGO
Search
- PMC: articles
- PubMed: articles
- NCBI: proteins

In enzymology, a malate dehydrogenase (oxaloacetate-decarboxylating) (EC 1.1.1.38) is an enzyme that catalyzes the chemical reaction

(S)-Malic acid
+ NAD^{+}
H^{+}
H^{+}
Pyruvic acid
+ CO_{2} + NADH

The two substrates of this enzyme are (S)-malic acid and oxidised nicotinamide adenine dinucleotide (NAD^{+}). Its products are pyruvic acid, carbon dioxide, and reduced NADH.

In humans, this enzyme activity is performed by malic enzyme 2 which is encoded by the gene ME2.

This enzyme belongs to the family of oxidoreductases, specifically those acting on the CH-OH group of donor with NAD^{+} or NADP^{+} as acceptor. The systematic name of this enzyme class is (S)-malate:NAD^{+} oxidoreductase (oxaloacetate-decarboxylating). Other names in common use include malic enzyme, pyruvic-malic carboxylase, NAD^{+}-specific malic enzyme, NAD^{+}-malic enzyme, and NAD^{+}-linked malic enzyme. This enzyme participates in pyruvate metabolism.

== Structural studies ==
As of late 2007, 6 structures have been solved for this class of enzymes, with PDB accession codes PDB: 1DO8, PDB: 1EFK, PDB: 1EFL, PDB: 1GZ3, PDB: 1LLQ, PDB: 1O0S, PDB: 1PJ2, PDB: 1PJ3, PDB: 1PJ4, PDB: 1PJL, PDB: 1QR6, PDB: 1WW8, and PDB: 2DVM.

== See also ==
- Malate dehydrogenase (decarboxylating) which performs the same reaction
