= NAD(P)H quinone dehydrogenase 1 =

Protein-coding gene in the species Homo sapiens

NQO1
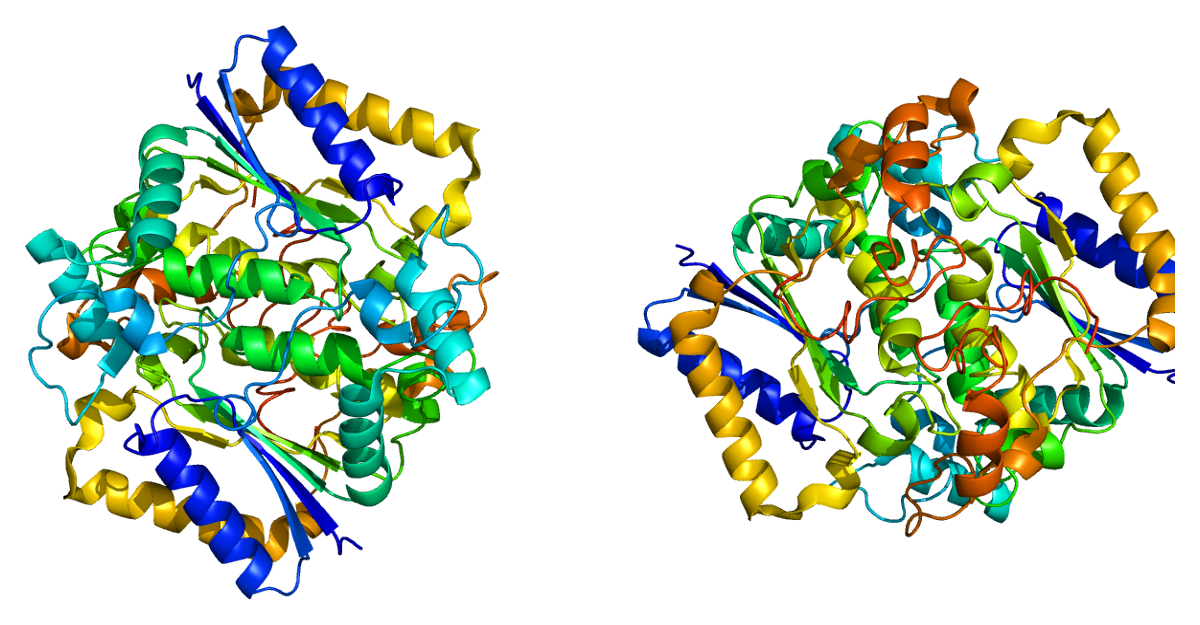

Identifiers
- Aliases: NQO1, DHQU, DIA4, DTD, NMOR1, NMORI, QR1, NAD(P)H dehydrogenase, NAD(P)H quinone dehydrogenase 1
- External IDs: MGI: 103187; GeneCards: NQO1
Available structures
PDB	Ortholog search: PDBe RCSB
PDB	List of PDB id codes 1D4A, 1DXO, 1GG5, 1H66, 1H69, 1KBO, 1KBQ, 1QBG, 2F1O, 3JSX, 4CET, 4CF6, 5EA2, 5EAI, 5A4K
Enzyme activity
EC #	BRENDA	ExPASy	KEGG	MetaCyc
1.6.5.2	↗	↗	↗	↗

Gene location (Human)
Chr.	Chromosome 16 (human)
Band	16q22.1	Start	69,706,996 bp
Band	16q22.1	End	69,726,668 bp

Gene location (Mouse)
Chr.	Chromosome 8 (mouse)
Band	8 D3|8 54.08 cM	Start	108,114,857 bp
Band	8 D3|8 54.08 cM	End	108,129,838 bp
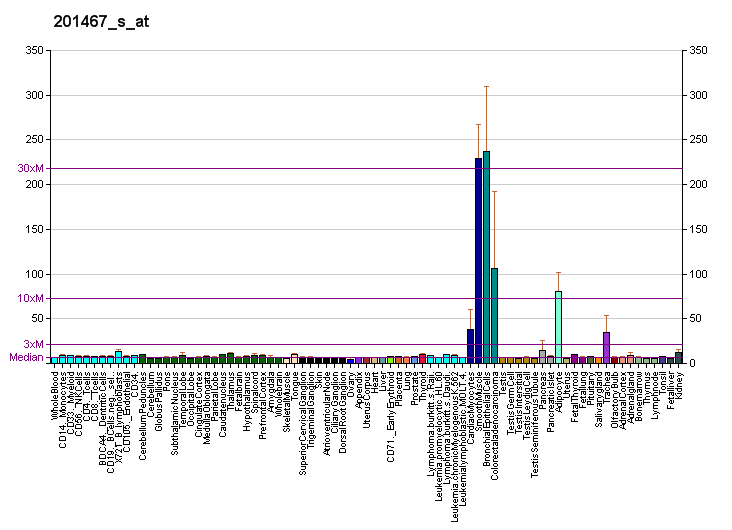

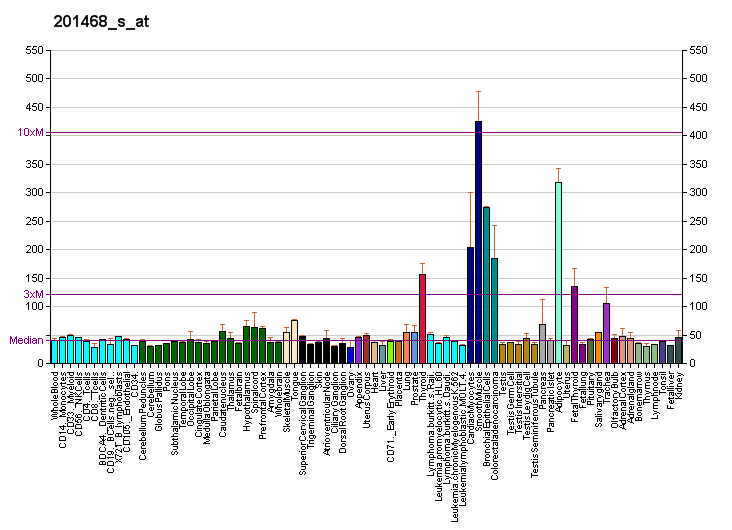

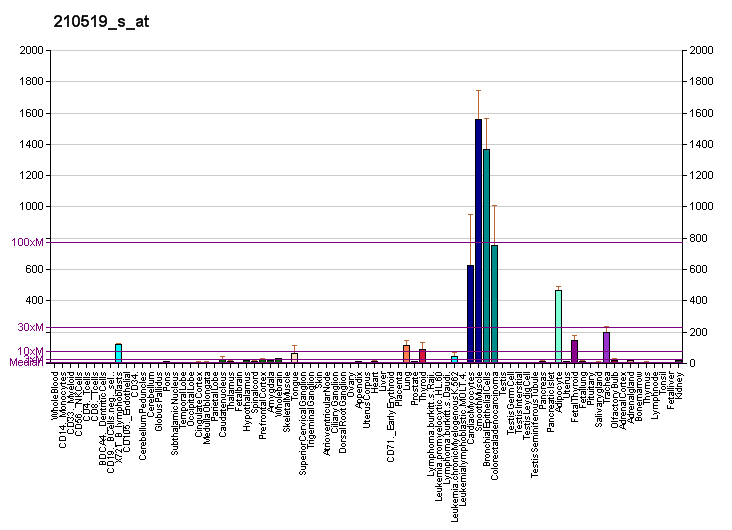
RNA expression pattern
Bgee	Human / Mouse (ortholog); Top expressed in: gallbladder; stromal cell of endometrium; nasal epithelium; olfactory zone of nasal mucosa; glomerulus; metanephric glomerulus; bronchial epithelial cell; islet of Langerhans; pylorus; Epithelium of choroid plexus / Top expressed in: epithelium of stomach; pyloric antrum; olfactory epithelium; mucous cell of stomach; transitional epithelium of urinary bladder; right kidney; duodenum; esophagus; proximal tubule; myocardium of ventricle; More reference expression data
BioGPS	More reference expression data
Gene ontology
Molecular function	superoxide dismutase activity; cytochrome-b5 reductase activity, acting on NAD(P)H; protein binding; identical protein binding; oxidoreductase activity; NAD(P)H dehydrogenase (quinone) activity; RNA binding; electron transfer activity
Cellular component	soma; extracellular exosome; cytoplasm; cytosol; dendrite
Biological process	response to estradiol; negative regulation of catalytic activity; nitric oxide biosynthetic process; regulation of cellular amino acid metabolic process; response to organic cyclic compound; response to nutrient; removal of superoxide radicals; ageing; synaptic transmission, cholinergic; response to oxidative stress; positive regulation of neuron apoptotic process; xenobiotic metabolic process; response to ethanol; response to toxic substance; superoxide metabolic process; negative regulation of apoptotic process; response to electrical stimulus; cellular response to metal ion; electron transport chain; cellular response to hydrogen peroxide; response to nitrogen compound; response to hydrogen sulfide
Sources:Amigo / QuickGO
Orthologs
Databases	NCBI: entry; OMA: entry
Species	Human	Mouse
Entrez	1728	18104
Ensembl	ENSG00000181019	ENSMUSG00000003849
UniProt	P15559	Q64669
RefSeq (mRNA)	NM_001286137; NM_000903; NM_001025433; NM_001025434	NM_008706
RefSeq (protein)	NP_000894; NP_001020604; NP_001020605; NP_001273066	NP_032732
Location (UCSC)	Chr 16: 69.71 – 69.73 Mb	Chr 8: 108.11 – 108.13 Mb
PubMed search
- Wikidata
View/Edit Human	View/Edit Mouse

NAD(P)H dehydrogenase [quinone] 1 is an enzyme that in humans is encoded by the NQO1 gene. This protein-coding gene is a member of the NAD(P)H dehydrogenase (quinone) family and encodes a 2-electron reductase (enzyme). This FAD-binding protein forms homodimers and performs two-electron reduction of quinones to hydroquinones and of other redox dyes. It has a preference for short-chain acceptor quinones, such as ubiquinone, benzoquinone, juglone and duroquinone. This gene has an important paralog NQO2. This protein is located in the cytosol.

NQO1 enzyme expression can be induced by dioxin and inhibited by dicoumarol.

== Function ==
This gene is a member of the NAD(P)H dehydrogenase (quinone) family and encodes a cytoplasmic 2-electron reductase. This FAD-binding protein forms homodimers and reduces quinones to hydroquinones. This enzyme facilitates the two electron reduction of quinone to hydroquinone. NQO1-mediated two electron reduction of quinone to hydroquinone thereby indirectly prevents the one electron reduction of quinone to the semiquinone free radical.

The ubiquitin-independent p53 degradation pathway is regulated by NQO1. NQO1 stabilizes p53, protecting it from degradation. Individuals with decreased NQO1 expression/activity have reduced p53 stability, which may lead to resistance to drugs such as chemotherapeutics.

=== Detoxification ===
Quinonoid compounds generate reactive oxygen species (ROS) via redox cycling mechanisms and arylating nucleophiles. NQO1 removes quinone from biological systems through detoxification reaction: NAD(P)H + a quinone → NAD(P)^{+} + a hydroquinone. This reaction oxidises the substrate without the formation of damaging semiquinone and oxygen free radical species. The localization of NQO1 in epithelial and endothelial tissues of mice, rats and humans indicates their importance in detoxifying agent, since their location facilitates exposure to compounds entering the body.

=== Vitamin k metabolism ===
The enzyme is also involved in biosynthetic processes such as the vitamin K-dependent gamma-carboxylation of glutamate residues in prothrombin synthesis. NQO1 catalyzes the reduction of vitamin K1, K2 and K3 into their hydroquinone form, but it only has a high affinity for Vitamin K3. Vitamin K hydroquinone serves as a cofactor for vitamin K γ‐carboxylase that catalyzes γ‐carboxylation of specific glutamic acid residues in Gla‐factors/proteins (Gla domain) leading to their activation and participation in blood clotting and bone metabolism. Vitamin K is used as radiation sensitizer or in mixtures with other chemotherapeutic drugs to treat several types of cancer. ROS generated in redox cycling contributes to anticancer activity of vitamin K. NQO1 competes with enzymes that redox cycle vitamin K to formation of semiquinone and ROS. NQO1is therefore able to detoxify vitamin K3 and protect cells against oxidative stress.

=== Bioactivation of antitumor agents ===
Several anti-tumor agents such as mitosenes, indolequinones, aziridinylbenzoquinones and β-lapachone have been designed be bioactivated by NQO1 from various prodrugs. The high levels of NQO1 expression in many human solid tumors compared to normal tissue ensures their selective activation within tumor cells.

=== Reduction of endogenous quinones ===
NQO1 plays a role in ubiquinone and vitamin E quinone metabolism. These quinones protect cellular membranes from peroxidative injury in their reduced state. Furthermore, reduced forms of ubiquinone and vitamin E quinone have been shown to possess antioxidant properties that are superior to their non-reduced forms.

== Polymorphisms ==
=== P187s ===
One widespread single-nucleotide polymorphism of the NQO1 gene (NQO1*2), found homozygous in 4% to 20% of different populations, has found to be connected with different forms of cancer and a lowered efficiency of some chemotherapeutics like mitomycin C. This single nucleotide polymorphism leads to a proline serine exchange on position 187. NAD(P)H dehydrogenase [quinone] 1 P187S has been shown to have a lowered activity and stability. Crystallographic and nuclear magnetic resonance data show that the reason for this different behaviour is found in a flexible C-terminus of the protein leading to a destabilization of the whole protein. Recent pharmacological research suggests feasibility of genotype-directed redox chemotherapeutic intervention targeting NQO1*2 breast cancer.

A comprehensive meta-analysis showed an association between overall cancer risk and P187S.

=== R139w ===
One further single nucleotide polymorphism, found homozygous in 0% to 5% of different ethnic population, is leading to an amino acid exchange on position 139 from arginine to tryptophane. Furthermore, an alternative RNA splicing site is created leading to a loss of the quinone binding site. The variant protein of NQO1*3 has similar stability as its wild-type counterpart. The variation between the two is substrate specific and it has reduced activity for some substrates. It has been recently shown that the NQO1*3 polymorphism may also lead to reduced NQO1 protein expression.

== Interactions ==
NAD(P)H dehydrogenase (quinone 1) has been shown to interact with HSPA4, p53, p33 and p73.

=== Regulation by keap1/nrf2/are pathway ===
External (via chemicals) and internal (stress response or caloric restriction) induction of NQO1 is mediated solely through the Keap1/Nrf2/ARE. Keap1 acts as the sensor which loses its ability to target Nrf2 for degradation upon exposure to the inducers. Nrf2 is consequently stabilized and accumulated in the nucleus upon which it binds to the AREs and initiates expression of cytoprotective genes including NQO1.

=== P53 and p73 ===
p53 and p73 are tumor suppressor proteins and their degradation is tightly regulated by ubiquitination. Recently it was shown that their degradation can also occur via an ubiquitin-independent process; NQO1 blocks p53 and p73 degradation in the presence of NADH and protects them from 20S proteasomal degradation. This protein-protein interaction between p53 and NQO1 was non-catalytic.

=== Ornithine decarboxylase ===
Ornithine decarboxylase (ODC), is a labile protein that is the first rate-limiting enzyme in polyamine biosynthesis. Its degradation is regulated by antizyme that is induced by polyamine production. NQO1 has been shown to stabilize the degradation of ODC by binding to it and protecting it from 20S proteasomal degradation.

== Clinical significance ==
Mutations in this gene have been associated with tardive dyskinesia (TD), an increased risk of hematotoxicity after exposure to benzene, and susceptibility to various forms of cancer. Altered expression of this protein has been seen in many tumors and is also associated with Alzheimer's disease (AD).

=== Benzene toxicity ===
Benzene poisoning can increase risk of hematological cancers and other disorders. The mechanism of benzene metabolism and how it affects toxicity has not been completely understood. A general observation is that there is high variation in the extent of damage due to benzene poisoning. A possible explanation is the accumulation of phenols and hydroquinone in the target organ—the bone marrow—and subsequent oxidation of these metabolites to reactive quinone metabolites via a number of possible pathways. A case-control study conducted in China showed that patients with two copies of the NQO1 C609T (NQO1*2 polymorphism) mutation had a 7.6-fold increased risk of benzene poisoning compared to those who carried one or two wild-type NQO1 alleles.

=== Alzheimer's disease ===
Oxidative stress has been linked to onset of Alzheimer's disease (AD) Since the NQO1*2 polymorphism affects the NQO1 activity and hence increase in oxidative stress, it has been postulated that this might increase the susceptibility of affected subjects for developing AD. A study conducted with a Chinese population consisting of 104 LOAD patients and 128 control patients disproved this hypothesis.

=== Cancer ===
Meta-analyses have been performed to examine the association between NQO1 polymorphism and increased cancer risk. The results from some of these analyses have been summarized in the table below:

Cancer Type	Polymorphism	Risk Odds Ratio (95% Confidence Interval)	Reference
Prostate	C609T	All ethnicities: No significant change Asians: 1.419 (1.1053-1.913)	
Acute Lymphoblastic Leukemia	C609T	All ethnicities: 1.46 (1.18-1.79) Non-Asians 1.74 (1.29-2.36)	
Breast	C609T	All ethnicities: No significant change Caucasians: 1.177 (1.041-1.331)	
Colorectal	C609T	All ethnicities: 1.34 (1.10-1.64)	
Bladder	C609T	All ethnicities: 1.18 (1.06-1.31)	
De novo childhood leukemia	C609T	All ethnicities: 1.58 (1.22-2.07) Europeans, Asians: 1.52 (1.05-2.19); English, Japanese: No significant change	
