= 3 hydroxyisobutyric aciduria =

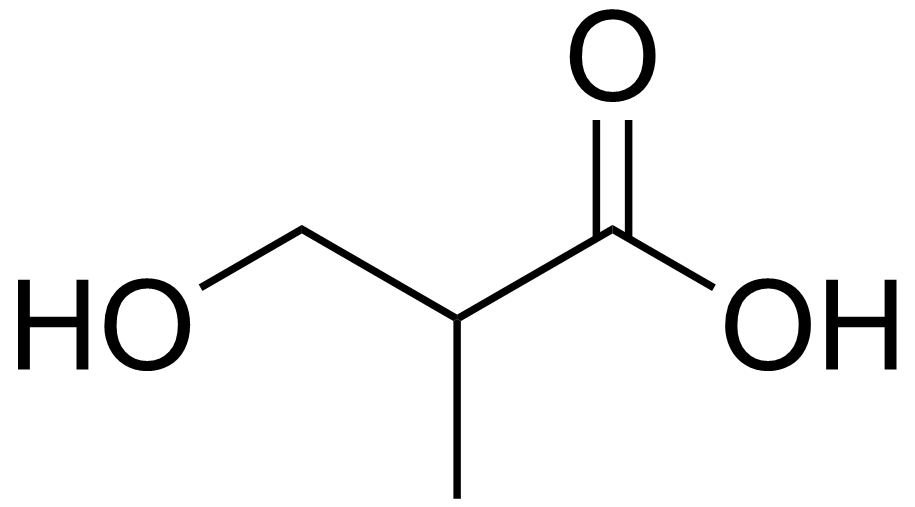
- Chemical structure of 3-hydroxyisobutyric acid.
- Specialty: Endocrinology
- Symptoms: Small triangular face, low-set ears, a long philtrum, and microcephaly.
- Usual onset: Prenatal period.
- Diagnostic method: Elevated amounts of 3-Hydroxyisobutyric acid in urine

3 Hydroxyisobutyric aciduria is a rare metabolic disorder in which the body is unable to metabolize certain amino acids. This causes a toxic buildup of specific acids called organic acids in the blood, tissues, and urine. The precise underlying cause remains unknown. Some cases may be caused by mutations in the ALDH6A1 gene and inherited autosomally recessively.

Clinical manifestations range from a mild or uneventful course to life-threatening ketoacidosis. Only ten patients had been described in publications as of 2006.

== Signs and symptoms ==
3-Hydroxyisobutyric aciduria typically presents during the prenatal period. These patients typically have dysmorphic characteristics such as a small triangular face, low-set ears, a long philtrum, and microcephaly. Individuals may exhibit a wide range of phenotypes, from mild episodes of vomiting accompanied by normal brain and cognitive development to severe mental impairment, delayed motor development, and early death.

== Causes ==
It was previously assumed that 3-hydroxyisobutyrate dehydrogenase (HIBADH) deficiency in the valine catabolic pathway was the underlying enzyme defect, but new evidence suggests that individuals with 3-hydroxyisobutyryic aciduria represent a heterogeneous group that has various underlying mechanisms, such as respiratory chain defects or methylmalonate semialdehyde dehydrogenase deficiency.

== Diagnosis ==
When in stable condition, patients with 3-Hydroxyisobutyric aciduria excrete elevated amounts of 3-Hydroxyisobutyric acid (3-HIBA) in urine, ranging from 60 to 390 mmol/mol of creatinine and increasing to 10,000 mmol/mol creatinine during acute ketoacidosis episodes.

== Treatment ==
There is limited evidence and no agreement on treatment; protein restriction and carnitine supplementation have been used.

== See also ==
- Lactic acidosis
- 3-Hydroxyisobutyric acid
