= C8H5NO2 =

The molecular formula C_{8}H_{5}NO_{2} (molar mass: 147.13 g/mol, exact mass: 147.032028 u) may refer to:

- Agrocybin
- Indole-5,6-quinone, a chemical present in the browning reaction of fruits
- Isatin
- Phthalimide
