= Cancer-related cognitive impairment =

Cancer-related cognitive impairment may refer to:

- Post-chemotherapy cognitive impairment, also known as Chemotherapy-Related Cognitive Impairment
- Radiation-induced cognitive decline
