= List of diseases (0–9) =

This is a list of diseases starting with a digit.

== 1–3 ==
- 10q partial trisomy
- 11 beta hydroxylase deficiency
- 11 beta hydroxysteroid dehydrogenase type 2 deficiency
- 17 alpha hydroxylase deficiency
- 17-beta-hydroxysteroid dehydrogenase deficiency, rare (NIH)
- 17q21.31 microdeletion syndrome
- 18-Hydroxylase deficiency, rare (NIH)
- 18p deletion syndrome
- 1p36 deletion syndrome, rare (NIH)
- 2-hydroxyethyl methacrylate sensitization, rare (NIH)
- 2-hydroxyglutaricaciduria
- 2-Hydroxyglutaricaciduria, rare (NIH)
- 2-Methylacetoacetyl CoA thiolase deficiency, rare (NIH)
- 2,8 dihydroxy-adenine urolithiasis
- 21 hydroxylase deficiency
- 22q11.2 deletion syndrome, rare (NIH)
- 3 alpha methylcrotonyl-Coa carboxylase 1 deficiency, rare (NIH)
- 3 alpha methylcrotonyl-coa carboxylase 2 deficiency, rare (NIH)
- 3 alpha methylglutaconic aciduria, type 3, rare (NIH)
- 3 beta hydroxysteroid dehydrogenase deficiency
- 3 hydroxyisobutyric aciduria, rare (NIH)
- 3 methylcrotonic aciduria
- 3 methylglutaconyl coa hydratase deficiency
- 3-hydroxy 3-methyl glutaryl-coa lyase deficiency
- 3-hydroxyacyl-coa dehydrogenase deficiency
- 3-M syndrome, rare (NIH)
- 3-methyl crotonyl-coa carboxylase deficiency
- 3-methyl glutaconic aciduria
- 3C syndrome, rare (NIH)
- 3q29 microdeletion syndrome

== 4–9 ==
- 4-Alpha-hydroxyphenylpyruvate hydroxylase deficiency, rare (NIH)
- 4-hydroxyphenylacetic aciduria, rare (NIH), optic atrophy
- 46 xx gonadal dysgenesis epibulbar dermoid, rare (NIH)
- 47, XXY syndrome
- 47, XYY syndrome
- 47, XXX syndrome
- 48, XXXX syndrome
- 48, XXYY syndrome
- 49, XXXXX syndrome
- 49, XXXXY syndrome
- 5 alpha reductase 2 deficiency
- 5-alpha-Oxoprolinase deficiency, rare (NIH)
- 5-Nucleotidase syndrome, rare (NIH)
- 5p minus syndrome
- 5q- syndrome
- 6 alpha mercaptopurine sensitivity, rare (NIH)
- 6-pyruvoyltetrahydropterin synthase deficiency
- 7-dehydrocholesterol reductase deficiency
- 8p23.1 duplication syndrome
- 9q34 deletion syndrome
