= Methylmalonate semialdehyde dehydrogenase =

Methylmalonate semialdehyde dehydrogenase may refer to:

- Methylmalonate-semialdehyde dehydrogenase (acylating)
- ALDH6A1
