= Streptolidine =

Names
- IUPAC name (4S)-2-amino-5-[(1R)-2-amino-1-hydroxyethyl]-4,5-dihydro-1H-imidazole-4-carboxylic acid
- Other names Roseonine, AC1MIYK9

Identifiers
| CAS Number | 29307-61-7 |
| 3D model (JSmol) | Interactive image |
| ChemSpider | 2339750 |
| PubChem CID | 15559481 |
- InChI: InChI=1S/C6H12N4O3/c7-1-2(11)3-4(5(12)13)10-6(8)9-3/h2-4,11H,1,7H2,(H,12,13)(H3,8,9,10) Key: BQSPOPBPQURHDF-UHFFFAOYSA-N
- SMILES: C(C(C1C(N=C(N1)N)C(=O)O)O)N

Properties
| Chemical formula | C_{6}H_{12}N_{4}O_{3} |
| Molar mass | 188.187 g·mol^{−1} |
- Except where otherwise noted, data are given for materials in their standard state (at 25 °C [77 °F], 100 kPa). Infobox references

Streptolidine is an amino acid isolated from the hydrolyzate of the Streptomyces antibiotics streptothricin and streptolin. Its structure was first elucidated by chemical degradation and later by x-ray crystallography.

== Synthesis ==
Syntheses have been accomplished from D-ribose and D-xylose.
