= (R)-3-amino-2-methylpropionate—pyruvate transaminase =

Class of enzymes

(R)-3-amino-2-methylpropionate-pyruvate transaminase

Identifiers
- EC no.: 2.6.1.40
- CAS no.: 37279-00-8

Databases
- IntEnz: IntEnz view
- BRENDA: BRENDA entry
- ExPASy: NiceZyme view
- KEGG: KEGG entry
- MetaCyc: metabolic pathway
- PRIAM: profile
- PDB structures: RCSB PDB PDBe PDBsum
- Gene Ontology: AmiGO / QuickGO
Search
- PMC: articles
- PubMed: articles
- NCBI: proteins

(R)-3-amino-2-methylpropionate—pyruvate transaminase (EC 2.6.1.40) is an enzyme that catalyzes the chemical reaction

(R)-3-aminoisobutyric acid
+
pyruvic acid
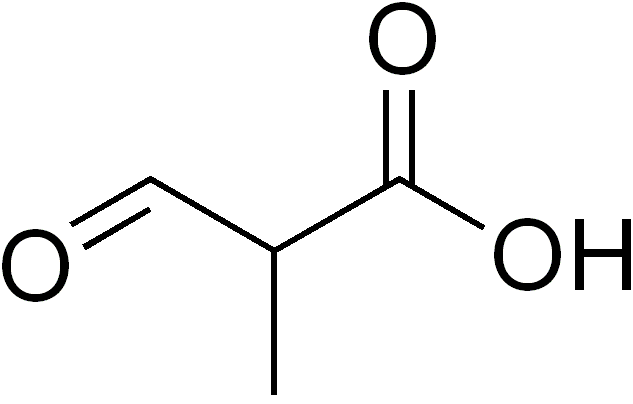
methylmalonic acid semialdehyde
+
alanine

The two substrates of this enzyme characterised from liver are (R)-3-aminoisobutyric acid and pyruvic acid. Its products are methylmalonic acid semialdehyde and L-alanine.

This enzyme is a transferase, specifically a transaminase, which transfer nitrogenous groups. The systematic name of this enzyme class is (R)-3-amino-2-methylpropanoate:pyruvate aminotransferase. Other names in common use include D-3-aminoisobutyrate-pyruvate transaminase, beta-aminoisobutyrate-pyruvate aminotransferase, D-3-aminoisobutyrate-pyruvate aminotransferase, D-3-aminoisobutyrate-pyruvate transaminase, (R)-3-amino-2-methylpropionate transaminase, and D-beta-aminoisobutyrate:pyruvate aminotransferase.
