= Indolequinones =

Indole-5,6-quinone

Mitomycin

Apaziquone

Indolequinones are molecules which are based upon an indole but have two additional ketone groups (quinone) attached to the ring structure.

This simple indolequinone indole-5,6-quinone is produced during the ripening of some fruit.

Other examples of indolequinones and the related mitosenes include natural compound mitomycin and the related chemotherapeutic agent apaziquone.
