= Streptomyces mutomycini =

Scientific classification
- Domain: Bacteria
- Kingdom: Bacillati
- Phylum: Actinomycetota
- Class: Actinomycetes
- Order: Streptomycetales
- Family: Streptomycetaceae
- Genus: Streptomyces
- Species: S. mutomycini

Binomial name
- Streptomyces mutomycini Gause and Maximova 1986

Type strain
- AS 4.1747, ATCC 43689, CGMCC 4.1747, DSM 41691, INA 4305, JCM 10455, LMG 20098, NBRC 100999, VKM Ac-1779

Species of bacterium

Streptomyces mutomycini is a bacterium species from the genus of Streptomyces which has been isolated from soil. Streptomyces mutomycini produces mutamycin. Cultures of different strains of S. hygroscopicus can be used to produce a number of chemical compounds or enzymes.

== See also ==
- List of Streptomyces species
