= C8H7NO2 =

The molecular formula C_{8}H_{7}NO_{2} (molar mass: 149.15 g/mol, exact mass: 149.0477 u) may refer to:

- 5,6-Dihydroxyindole
- NAPQI, also known as N-acetyl-p-benzoquinone imine or NABPQI
- β-Nitrostyrene
