= Streptomyces racemochromogenes =

Scientific classification
- Domain: Bacteria
- Kingdom: Bacillati
- Phylum: Actinomycetota
- Class: Actinomycetes
- Order: Streptomycetales
- Family: Streptomycetaceae
- Genus: Streptomyces
- Species: S. racemochromogenes

Binomial name
- Streptomyces racemochromogenes Sugai 1956

Type strain
- ATCC 23954, BCRC 12318, CBS 937.68, CCRC 12318, CGMCC 4.1998, DSM 40194, IFO 12906, ISP 5194, JCM 4407, Meiji Seika 229, NBRC 12906, NRRL B-5430, NRRL-ISP 5194, RIA 1147, VKM Ac-1206

Species of bacterium

Streptomyces racemochromogenes is a bacterium species from the genus of Streptomyces. Streptomyces racemochromogenes produces phospholipase D, the acemomycine complex and the streptothricin complex.

== See also ==
- List of Streptomyces species
