= Valine (data page) =

Chemical data page

The complete data for Valine
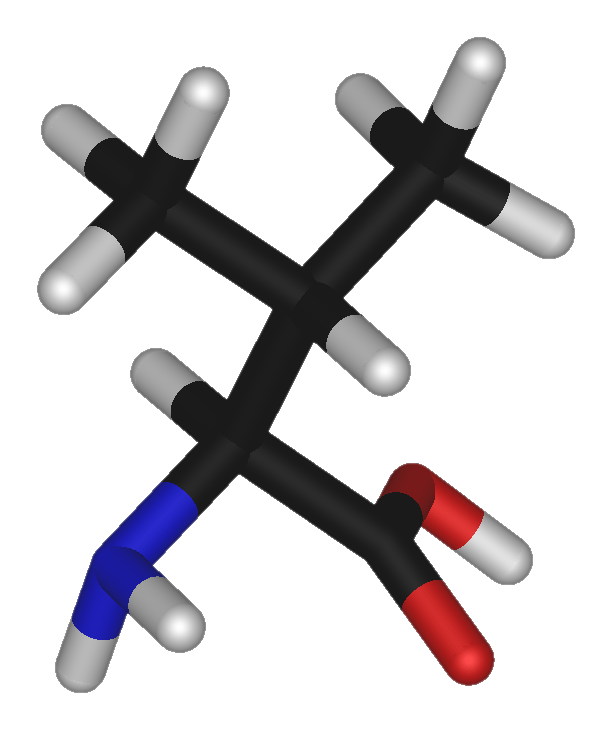
General information
Chemical formula: C_{5}H_{11}NO_{2}
Molar mass: 117.15 g·mol^{−1}
Systematic name:
(S)-2-amino-3-methyl-butanoic acid
Abbreviations: V, Val
Synonyms:
none
Database data
SMILES: CC(C)C(N)C(=O)O
InChI=1/C5H11NO2/c1-3(2)4(6)5(7)8/h3-4H,6H2,1-2H3,(H,7,8)/f/h7H

| ATC: N/A | CAS: 72-18-4 | DrugBank: N/A | EINECS: 200-773-6 ^{a} | PubChem: 71563 (D)^{a}, 1182 (L)^{a} |

Physical properties

| Structure | Crystal data | Spectral data: UV-Vis / IR / NMR / MS: Masses of main fragments: GMD MS Spectrum |

| Phase behavior | Solid properties ρ_{solid}: 1.230 g.cm^{−3} T_{m}: 315 °C | Liquid properties | Gas properties |

Hazard properties

| MSDS N/A | Main hazards: N/A | NFPA 704 | Flash point: N/A | RTECS number: N/A |

Chemical properties

| XLogP: -2.193 | pI: 5.96 | pK_{a}: 2.27, 9.52 | Tautomers: | Hydrogen bond: donor - 2; acceptor - 3 |

Pharmacological properties

This box:
- Except where noted otherwise, data relate to Standard temperature and pressure.
- Reliability of data general note.
