= Apaziquone =

Chemical compound

Clinical data
- ATC code: None

Legal status
- Legal status: US: Investigational New Drug

Identifiers
- IUPAC name: (E)-5-(1-Azirinyl)-3-(hydroxymethyl)-2-(3-hydroxy-1-propenyl)-1-methyl-1H-indole-4,7-dione
- CAS Number: 114560-48-4
- PubChem CID: 5813717
- ChemSpider: 4710342
- UNII: H464ZO600O
- KEGG: D02965
- ChEMBL: ChEMBL73822
- CompTox Dashboard (EPA): DTXSID90869587

Chemical and physical data
- Formula: C_{15}H_{16}N_{2}O_{4}
- Molar mass: 288.303 g·mol^{−1}
- 3D model (JSmol): Interactive image
- SMILES: Cn1c(c(c2c1C(=O)C=C(C2=O)N3CC3)CO)/C=C/CO
- InChI: InChI=1S/C15H16N2O4/c1-16-10(3-2-6-18)9(8-19)13-14(16)12(20)7-11(15(13)21)17-4-5-17/h2-3,7,18-19H,4-6,8H2,1H3/b3-2+; Key:MXPOCMVWFLDDLZ-NSCUHMNNSA-N

Apaziquone (tentative trade name EOquin) is an indolequinone that is a bioreductive prodrug similar to the older chemotherapeutic agent mitomycin C. In hypoxic cells, such as those on the inner surface of the urinary bladder, apaziquone is converted to active metabolites by intracellular reductases. The active metabolites alkylate DNA and lead to apoptosis. This activity is preferentially expressed in neoplastic cells.

After administration of apaziquone directly into the urinary bladder (intravesically), the drug and its active metabolite were not detected in plasma, and there were no systemic side effects.

Apaziquone has been applied in clinical studies sponsored by Spectrum Pharmaceuticals and Allergan for the treatment of superficial (non-muscle invasive) bladder cancer. Approximately 70% of all newly diagnosed patients with bladder cancer have non-muscle invasive bladder cancer and over one million patients in the United States and Europe are affected by the disease. The U.S. Food and Drug Administration (FDA) has granted Fast Track review status to apaziquone for this indication. In 2016, FDA issued a complete response letter informing the company that its new drug application for apaziquone in bladder cancer would not be approved.
