= Streptomyces lavendulae =

Scientific classification
- Domain: Bacteria
- Kingdom: Bacillati
- Phylum: Actinomycetota
- Class: Actinomycetia
- Order: Streptomycetales
- Family: Streptomycetaceae
- Genus: Streptomyces
- Species: S. lavendulae

Binomial name
- Streptomyces lavendulae (Waksman and Curtis 1916) Waksman and Henrici 1948 (Approved Lists 1980)

Subspecies
- subsp. lavendulae (Waksman and Curtis 1916) Pridham 1970 (Approved Lists 1980); subsp. grasserius (Kuchaeva et al. 1961) Pridham 1970 (Approved Lists 1980)

Synonyms
- "Actinomyces lavendulae" Waksman and Curtis 1916; "Actinomyces lavendulae subsp. grasserius" Kuchaeva et al. 1961

Species of bacterium

Streptomyces lavendulae is a species of bacteria from the genus Streptomyces. It is isolated from soils globally and is known for its production of medically useful biologically active metabolites. To see a photo of this organism click here.

== Description and significance ==
Streptomyces lavendulae was first isolated from soil in 1916, and has since been isolated from many soils throughout the world. It is characterized by colorless growth with lavender colored aerial mycelium, though white mutants have been observed . The order Actinomycetales is composed of organisms well known for their ability to make a wide range of biologically active metabolites. S. lavendulae produces many medically useful antibiotics including streptothricin and lavendamycin, although some mutant strains exist without aerial mycelium, which are unable to produce antibiotics.

== Cell morphology and physiology ==
Actinomycetes are Gram-positive bacteria that resemble fungi in structure with a complex branched network of cells called a mycelium. Isolates of Streptomyces lavendulae from different soils around the world vary morphologically and physiologically, with some strains producing straight aerial mycelium, while other isolates form spiral mycelium. The coloration of the mycelia can range from white to lavender to a deep red. These mycelia later give rise to spores that are oval with a smooth surface. All strains of S. lavendulae produce dark pigments on organic media, which can range in color from brown to greenish-black. S. lavendulae growth occurs between 20 °C and 43 °C and its optimum temperature is 37 °C and growth and sporulation occur at pH ranging from 5.0-8.0 and its optimum pH is 7.0.

== Metabolism ==
Streptomyces have the ability to utilize many different compounds as part of their metabolism including sugars, amino acids, and alcohols through the production of extracellular enzymes. Carbon utilization studies on S. lavendulae have shown good or moderate growth with glucose, fructose, and arabinose as the substrate.

== Genome structure ==
While most bacteria have circular chromosomes, all actinomycetes chromosomes are linear and fairly large, 8-9Mb. In addition, actinomycete genomes contain extrachromosomal genetic elements such as rolling circle replication plasmids. These extrachromosomal genetic elements have been shown to transport their own genes as well as chromosomal genes to other actinomycete hosts. This provides a pathway for genetic information to be exchanged between cells, and could provide a mechanism for the transfer of antibiotic resistance between organisms. One study found genes for streptothricin resistance, an antibiotic produced by Actinomycete bacteria, on plasmids within gram-negative bacteria.

== Pathology ==
Streptomyces lavendulae has not been identified as a pathogen and is not known to be the cause of any human diseases.

== Medical importance ==
=== Production of antibiotics ===
Filamentous soil bacteria from the genus Streptomyces are important sources of biologically active compounds used in pharmaceutical and agrochemical industries. In fact, bacteria from the genus Streptomyces produce 75% of commercially and medically useful antibiotics. In 1942, Streptothricin, an antibiotic made by Actinomycetes, was found to be produced by a strain of S. lavendulae.

Many natural compounds have led to the discovery of drugs used to treat human disease. Out of the 22,500 biologically active compounds that have been extracted from microbes, 45% are from Actinomycetota. In 1956, Streptomyces lavendulae was found to produce an antibiotic called Mitomycin C, which has been studied for its cytotoxic effects on cancer cells.

=== Antibiotic resistance ===
It has been observed that cultures of S. lavendulae that produce streptothricin are resistant to the effects of this antibiotic. Many studies show the presence of multiple pathways for resistance toward a single antibiotic with the resistance genes located next to the antibiotic biosynthetic genes. Mytomycin C (MC), an antibiotic produced by S. lavendulae, exhibits cytotoxicity when the activated drug covalently binds complementary strands of DNA. Streptomycetes contain an average G+C content of 70% making them very susceptible to the harmful effects of MC. S. lavendulae has three known genetic loci for resistance to MC. The first genetic locus (mcr) codes for two genes which inactivate MC in vivo through an oxidation process. The second locus (mrd) binds with MC as a complex which prevents drug activation. The third locus (mct) encodes a membrane-associated protein involved in the excretion of MC from the cell. These antibiotic resistance genes are tightly linked within the MC biosynthetic gene cluster. This coordinated gene regulation along with the multiple resistance loci effectively confer MC antibiotic resistance to S. lavendulae.
