= Valine—pyruvate transaminase =

Valine-pyruvate transaminase

Identifiers
- EC no.: 2.6.1.66
- CAS no.: 132421-38-6

Databases
- IntEnz: IntEnz view
- BRENDA: BRENDA entry
- ExPASy: NiceZyme view
- KEGG: KEGG entry
- MetaCyc: metabolic pathway
- PRIAM: profile
- PDB structures: RCSB PDB PDBe PDBsum
- Gene Ontology: AmiGO / QuickGO
Search
- PMC: articles
- PubMed: articles
- NCBI: proteins

Valine-pyruvate transaminase (EC 2.6.1.66) is an enzyme that catalyzes the chemical reaction

valine
+
pyruvic acid
α-ketoisovaleric acid
+
alanine

The two substrates of this enzyme characterised from Escherichia coli are L-valine and pyruvic acid. Its products are α-ketoisovaleric acid and L-alanine.

This enzyme is a transferase, specifically a transaminase, which transfer nitrogenous groups. The systematic name of this enzyme class is L-valine:pyruvate aminotransferase. Other names in common use include transaminase C, valine-pyruvate aminotransferase, and alanine-oxoisovalerate aminotransferase. It participates in valine, leucine and isoleucine biosynthesis.
