= Lavendamycin =

Names
- Preferred IUPAC name 1-(7-Amino-5,8-dioxo-5,8-dihydroquinolin-2-yl)-4-methyl-9H-pyrido[3,4-b]indole-3-carboxylic acid

Identifiers
CAS Number	81645-09-2
3D model (JSmol)	Interactive image
ChemSpider	90882
PubChem CID	100585
UNII	XL8988YP79
CompTox Dashboard (EPA)	DTXSID401002112
- InChI: InChI=1S/C22H14N4O4/c1-9-16-10-4-2-3-5-13(10)24-20(16)19(26-17(9)22(29)30)14-7-6-11-15(27)8-12(23)21(28)18(11)25-14/h2-8,24H,23H2,1H3,(H,29,30) Key: IGQJRDIREIWBQP-UHFFFAOYSA-N; InChI=1/C22H14N4O4/c1-9-16-10-4-2-3-5-13(10)24-20(16)19(26-17(9)22(29)30)14-7-6-11-15(27)8-12(23)21(28)18(11)25-14/h2-8,24H,23H2,1H3,(H,29,30) Key: IGQJRDIREIWBQP-UHFFFAOYAD
- SMILES: Cc1c2c3ccccc3[nH]c2c(nc1C(=O)O)c4ccc5c(n4)C(=O)C(=CC5=O)N

Properties
Chemical formula	C_{22}H_{14}N_{4}O_{4}
Molar mass	398.378 g·mol^{−1}
Appearance	Dark red crystals
Melting point	>300 °C
- Except where otherwise noted, data are given for materials in their standard state (at 25 °C [77 °F], 100 kPa). Infobox references

Lavendamycin is a naturally occurring chemical compound discovered in fermentation broth of the soil bacterium Streptomyces lavendulae. Lavendamycin has antibiotic properties and anti-proliferative effects against several cancer cell lines. The use of lavendamycin as a cytotoxic agent in cancer therapy failed due to poor water solubility and non-specific cytotoxicity. The study of lavendamycin-based analogs designed to overcome these liabilities has been an area of research.

== Discovery ==
Lavendamycin was first discovered in 1981 by Doyle et al., who isolated it from Streptomyces lavendulae. As the compound failed to crystallize, a direct characterization of the molecular structure with X-ray crystallography was not possible. Careful analysis using NMR, IR, and UV-VIS spectroscopy and mass spectrometry allowed the assignment of the pentacyclic structure consisting of a β-carboline unit and a quinolinequinone unit.

== Total syntheses ==
The attractive biological properties and complex structure of lavendamycin have made it the target of a large number of total syntheses. Within a few years after the structural elucidation by Doyle et al., the research groups of Kende, Hibino, Rao, and Boger had already developed total syntheses for the compound independently of one another. The discovery that analogs of lavendamycin are potent inhibitors of HIV reverse transcriptase led to further attempts in the 90s to develop efficient routes to lavendamycin. However, large numbers of steps, low overall yields (0.5–2%) or poorly available starting materials make these syntheses unattractive for further systematic development of lavendamycin and its analogs. Notably, total syntheses by Behforouz and Nissen offer flexible construction of the lavendamycin scaffold at high yields.
