= 3-hydroxyisobutyrate dehydrogenase =

Protein-coding gene in the species Homo sapiens

Identifiers
- EC no.: 1.1.1.31
- CAS no.: 9028-39-1

Databases
- IntEnz: IntEnz view
- BRENDA: BRENDA entry
- ExPASy: NiceZyme view
- KEGG: KEGG entry
- MetaCyc: metabolic pathway
- PRIAM: profile
- PDB structures: RCSB PDB PDBe PDBsum
- Gene Ontology: AmiGO / QuickGO
Search
- PMC: articles
- PubMed: articles
- NCBI: proteins

HIBADH
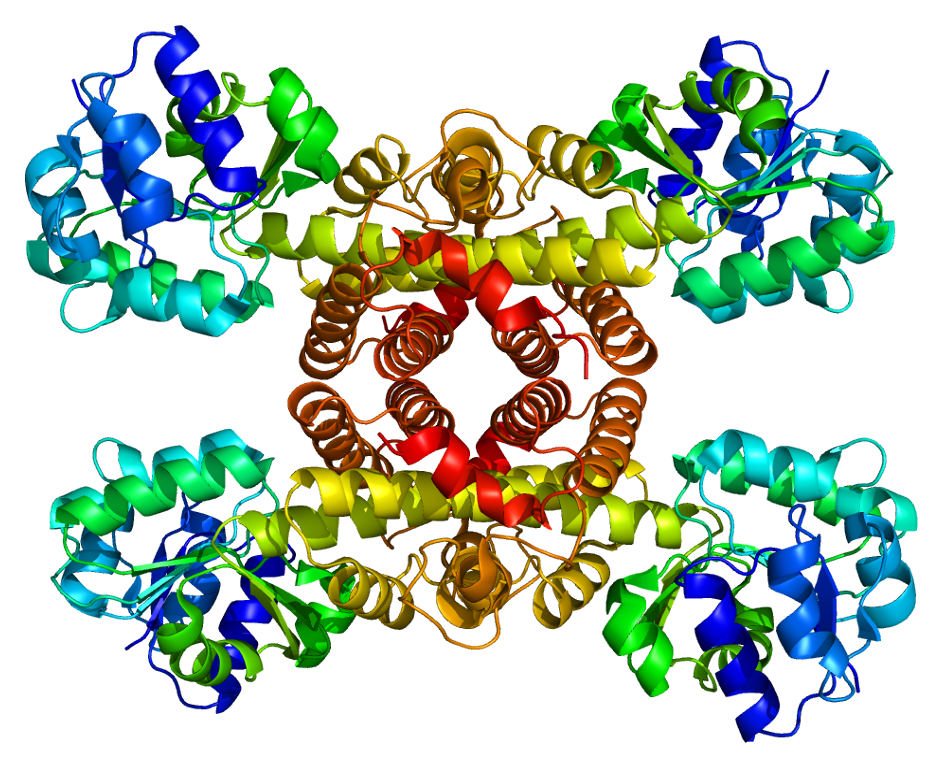
Available structures
PDB	Ortholog search: PDBe RCSB
PDB	List of PDB id codes 2GF2, 2I9P

Identifiers
- Aliases: HIBADH, Hibadh, 6430402H10Rik, AI265272, NS5ATP1, 3-hydroxyisobutyrate dehydrogenase
- External IDs: OMIM: 608475; MGI: 1889802; HomoloGene: 15088; GeneCards: HIBADH; OMA:HIBADH - orthologs
- EC number: 1.1.1.31

Gene location (Human)
Chr.	Chromosome 7 (human)
Band	7p15.2	Start	27,525,442 bp
Band	7p15.2	End	27,662,883 bp

Gene location (Mouse)
Chr.	Chromosome 6 (mouse)
Band	6|6 B3	Start	52,523,213 bp
Band	6|6 B3	End	52,617,374 bp
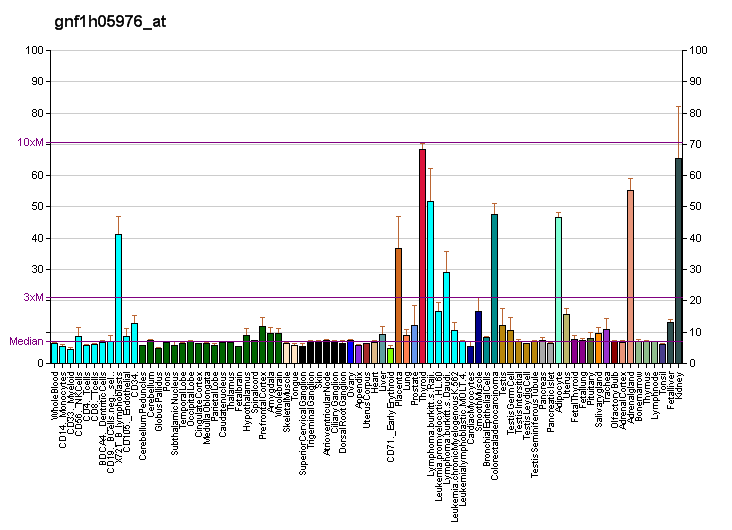
RNA expression pattern
Bgee	Human / Mouse (ortholog); Top expressed in: myocardium of left ventricle; cardiac muscle tissue of right atrium; renal medulla; right adrenal cortex; human kidney; left adrenal gland; quadriceps femoris muscle; left adrenal cortex; vastus lateralis muscle; deltoid muscle / Top expressed in: right kidney; brown adipose tissue; epithelium of stomach; proximal tubule; interventricular septum; lacrimal gland; myocardium of ventricle; left lobe of liver; right ventricle; digastric muscle; More reference expression data
BioGPS	More reference expression data
Gene ontology
Molecular function	3-hydroxyisobutyrate dehydrogenase activity; oxidoreductase activity; NAD binding; phosphogluconate dehydrogenase (decarboxylating) activity; NADP binding; oxidoreductase activity, acting on the CH-OH group of donors, NAD or NADP as acceptor
Cellular component	mitochondrial matrix; mitochondrion
Biological process	valine catabolic process; branched-chain amino acid catabolic process
Sources:Amigo / QuickGO
Orthologs
Species	Human	Mouse
Entrez	11112	58875
Ensembl	ENSG00000106049	ENSMUSG00000029776
UniProt	P31937	Q99L13
RefSeq (mRNA)	NM_152740	NM_145567
RefSeq (protein)	NP_689953	NP_663542
Location (UCSC)	Chr 7: 27.53 – 27.66 Mb	Chr 6: 52.52 – 52.62 Mb
PubMed search
- Wikidata
View/Edit Human	View/Edit Mouse

In enzymology, a 3-hydroxyisobutyrate dehydrogenase (EC 1.1.1.31) also known as β-hydroxyisobutyrate dehydrogenase or 3-hydroxyisobutyrate dehydrogenase, mitochondrial (HIBADH) is an enzyme that in humans is encoded by the HIBADH gene.

3-Hydroxyisobutyrate dehydrogenase catalyzes the chemical reaction:

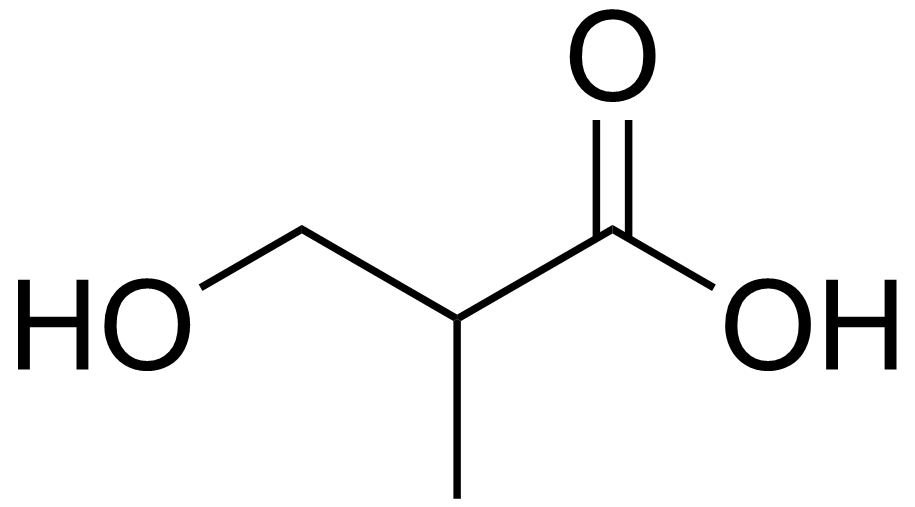
3-Hydroxyisobutyric acid
+ NAD^{+}
H^{+}
H^{+}
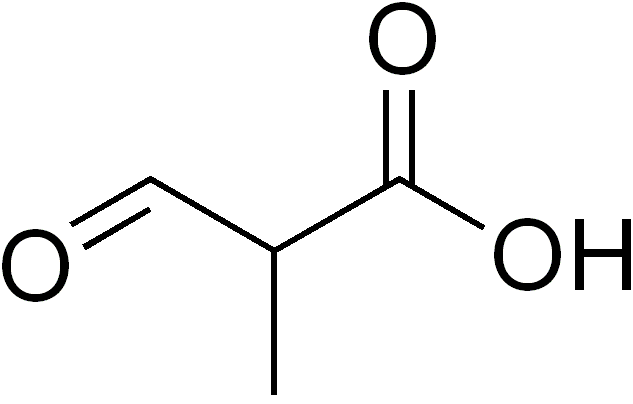
Methylmalonic acid semialdehyde
+ NADPH

The two substrates of this enzyme are 3-hydroxyisobutyric acid and oxidised nicotinamide adenine dinucleotide (NAD^{+}). Its products are methylmalonic acid semialdehyde, reduced NADH, and a proton.

This enzyme belongs to the family of oxidoreductases, specifically those acting on the CH-OH group of donor with NAD^{+} or NADP^{+} as acceptor. The systematic name of this enzyme class is 3-hydroxy-2-methylpropanoate:NAD^{+} oxidoreductase. This enzyme participates in valine, leucine and isoleucine degradation.

== Function ==
3-hydroxyisobutyrate dehydrogenase is a tetrameric mitochondrial enzyme that catalyzes the NAD^{+}-dependent, reversible oxidation of 3-hydroxyisobutyrate, an intermediate of valine catabolism, to methylmalonate semialdehyde.

== Structural studies ==
As of late 2007, five structures have been solved for this class of enzymes, with PDB accession codes 1WP4, 2CVZ, 2GF2, 2H78, and 2I9P.
