= Hawkinsin =

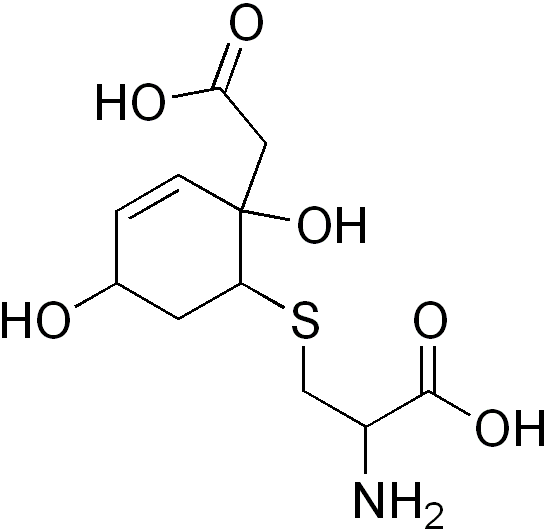

Names
- IUPAC name 2-Amino-3-[[2-(carboxymethyl)-2,5-dihydroxy-1-cyclohex-3-enyl]sulfanyl]propanoic acid
- Other names (2-L-Cystein-S-yl-1,4-dihydroxycyclohex-5-en-1-yl)acetic acid

Identifiers
CAS Number	63224-90-8
3D model (JSmol)	Interactive image
ChEBI	CHEBI:149584
ChemSpider	151775
PubChem CID	173909
CompTox Dashboard (EPA)	DTXSID10866992
- InChI: InChI=1S/C11H17NO6S/c12-7(10(16)17)5-19-8-3-6(13)1-2-11(8,18)4-9(14)15/h1-2,6-8,13,18H,3-5,12H2,(H,14,15)(H,16,17) Key: SPXVLTDISXZSFM-UHFFFAOYSA-N
- SMILES: C1C(C=CC(C1SCC(C(=O)O)N)(CC(=O)O)O)O

Properties
Chemical formula	C_{11}H_{17}NO_{6}S
Molar mass	291.32 g/mol
- Except where otherwise noted, data are given for materials in their standard state (at 25 °C [77 °F], 100 kPa). verify (what is ?) Infobox references

Hawkinsin (also known as 2-cystenyl-1,4-dihydroxycyclohexenylacetate) is an amino acid, which is formed after detoxification of a reactive tyrosine metabolite (quinol acetate) by glutathione. Hawkinsin is ninhydrin positive (a common test to detect amino acids and proteins with a free -NH_{2} group).

It is found in elevated concentrations in the urine in hawkinsinuria, which is probably related to the depletion of glutathione and resulting high excretion of 5-oxoproline.
