= 5,6-Dihydroxyindole =

Names
- Preferred IUPAC name 1H-Indole-5,6-diol
- Other names: Dopamine lutine; Aminochrome; DHI

Identifiers
CAS Number	3131-52-0
3D model (JSmol)	Interactive image
ChEBI	CHEBI:27404
ChEMBL	ChEMBL92636
ChemSpider	102690
DrugBank	DB01811
ECHA InfoCard	100.101.149
EC Number	412-130-9
KEGG	C05578
PubChem CID	114683
UNII	Z3OC8499KG
CompTox Dashboard (EPA)	DTXSID20185242
- InChI: InChI=1S/C8H7NO2/c10-7-3-5-1-2-9-6(5)4-8(7)11/h1-4,9-11H Key: SGNZYJXNUURYCH-UHFFFAOYSA-N
- SMILES: C1=CNC2=CC(=C(C=C21)O)O

Properties
Chemical formula	C_{8}H_{7}NO_{2}
Molar mass	149.149 g·mol^{−1}

Hazards
- GHS labelling
Pictograms	(GHS05: Corrosive) (GHS07: Exclamation mark) (GHS09: Environmental hazard)
Signal word	Danger
Hazard statements	H302, H318, H411
Precautionary statements	P264, P264+P265, P270, P273, P280, P301+P317, P305+P354+P338, P317, P330, P391, P501
- Except where otherwise noted, data are given for materials in their standard state (at 25 °C [77 °F], 100 kPa). Infobox references

5,6-Dihydroxyindole, also known as aminochrome, is a chemical compound with the molecular formula C_{8}H_{7}NO_{2}. It is an intermediate in the production of the biological pigment eumelanin. 5,6-Dihydroxyindole is biosynthesized from L-dopachrome in a reaction catalyzed by a tyrosinase enzyme and is further converted into indole-5,6-quinone. In humans, 5,6-dihydroxyindole is involved in the metabolic disorder hawkinsinuria.

In some insects, 5,6-dihydroxyindole is a reactive compound that is produced as a component of defense responses and has antibacterial and antifungal activity.

A laboratory synthesis of 5,6-dihydroxyindole can be accomplished starting from 3,4-dibenzyloxybenzaldehyde. This compound is condensed with nitromethane in a Henry reaction, followed by nitration, reduction of the nitro groups, and hydrogenolysis of the benzyl protecting groups.

== See also ==
- Adrenochrome
- Adrenolutin
