= Post-chemotherapy cognitive impairment =

Impairment that can result from chemotherapy treatment

Post-chemotherapy cognitive impairment (PCCI, also known in the scientific community as CRCIs or Chemotherapy-Related Cognitive Impairments" and in lay terms as chemotherapy-induced cognitive dysfunction or impairment, chemo brain, or chemo fog) describes the cognitive impairment that can result from chemotherapy treatment. While there is no concrete statistic for the number of patients that experience some level of post-chemotherapy cognitive impairment, the estimated percentage is between 13 and 70 percent of patients. The phenomenon first came to light because of the large number of breast cancer survivors who complained of changes in memory, fluency, and other cognitive abilities that impeded their ability to function as they had pre-chemotherapy.

Although the causes and existence of post-chemotherapy cognitive impairment have been a subject of debate, recent studies have confirmed that post-chemotherapy cognitive impairment is a real, measurable side effect of chemotherapy that appears in some patients. While any cancer patient may experience temporary cognitive impairment while undergoing chemotherapy, patients with PCCI continue to experience these symptoms long after chemotherapy has been completed. Some patients may experience cognitive dysfunction up to 10 years after undergoing chemotherapy treatment. PCCI is often seen in patients treated for breast cancer, ovarian cancer, prostate cancer, and other reproductive cancers, as well as other types of cancers requiring aggressive treatment with chemotherapy.

The clinical relevance of PCCI is significant, considering the increasing number of long-term cancer survivors in the population, many of whom may have been treated with aggressive dosing of chemotherapeutic agents, or with chemotherapy as an adjuvant to other forms of treatment. In some patients, fear of PCCI can impact treatment decisions. The magnitude of chemotherapy-related cognitive changes and their impact on the activities of daily living are uncertain.

== Signs and symptoms ==
The systems of the body most affected by chemotherapy drugs include visual and semantic memory, attention and motor coordination and executive functioning. These effects can impair a chemotherapy patient's ability to understand and make decisions regarding treatment, perform in school or employment and can reduce quality of life. Survivors often report difficulty multitasking, comprehending what they have just read, following the thread of a conversation, and retrieving words.

Breast cancer survivors who were treated with chemotherapy may find it harder to perform tasks than survivors whose treatment was surgical. One study demonstrated that, a year after treatment, the brains of cancer survivors treated with chemotherapy (after surgery) had physically shrunk while those of people only treated surgically had not.

Post-chemotherapy cognitive impairment comes as a surprise to many cancer survivors. Often, survivors think their lives will return to normal when the cancer is gone, only to find that the lingering effects of post-chemotherapy cognitive impairment impede their efforts. Working, connecting with loved ones, carrying out day-to-day tasks—all can be very challenging for an impaired brain. Due to such challenges, patients have reported difficulty concentrating to be as significant a stressor as dealing with thoughts of mortality. Although post-chemotherapy cognitive impairment appears to be temporary, it can be quite long-lived, with some cases lasting 10 years or more.

== Proposed mechanisms ==
The details of PCCI's causes and boundaries are not well known. Two major theories have been advanced: the direct effect of chemotherapy drugs on the brain, and the role of hormones in nervous system health.

PCCI is complex and factors other than the chemotherapeutic agents may impact cognitive functioning. Menopause, the biological impact of a surgical procedure with anesthesia, medications prescribed in addition to the chemotherapy, genetic predisposition, hormone therapy, emotional states (including anxiety, depression and fatigue), comorbid conditions and paraneoplastic syndrome may all co-occur and act as confounding factors in the study or experience of PCCI. Chemotherapy drugs thalidomide, the epothilones such as ixabepilone, the vinca alkaloids vincristine and vinblastine, the taxanes paclitaxel and docetaxel, the proteasome inhibitors such as bortezomib, and the platinum-based drugs cisplatin, oxaliplatin and carboplatin often cause chemotherapy-induced peripheral neuropathy, a progressive and enduring tingling numbness, intense pain, and hypersensitivity to cold, beginning in the hands and feet and sometimes involving the arms and legs. In most cases there is no known way of reducing the effects of chemotherapeutic agents related to taxanes, thalidomide and platinum-based compounds (oxaliplatin is a notable exception to the latter category—though it does cause PCCI its effects can be buffered by infusion of calcium and thought related to PCCI include the ability of the nerves to repair themselves, the ability of cells to excrete compounds, permeability of the blood–brain barrier, damage done to DNA including shortening of telomeres and cellular oxidative stress.

The importance of hormones, particularly estrogen, on cognitive function is underscored by the presence of cognitive impairment in breast cancer patients before chemotherapy is begun, the similarity of the cognitive impairments to several menopausal symptoms, the increased rate of PCCI in pre-menopausal women, and the fact that the symptoms can frequently be reversed by taking estrogen.

Other theories suggest vascular injury, inflammation, autoimmunity, anemia and the presence of the epsilon 4 version of the apolipoprotein E gene.

Fifty-six of the 132 chemotherapy agents approved by the FDA have been reported to induce oxidative stress.

The drug doxorubicin (adriamycin) has been investigated as a PCCI-causing agent due to its production of reactive oxygen species. It has been investigated in an animal model with mice.

Mice were treated with the chemotherapeutic agent mitomycin C. In the prefrontal cortex, this treatment resulted in an increase of the oxidative DNA damage 8-oxodG, a decrease in the enzyme OGG1 that ordinarily repairs such damage, and an increase in epigenetic alterations. These alterations, at the DNA level, may explain, at least in part, the impairments of cognitive function after chemotherapy.

Research has revealed that neural progenitor cells are particularly vulnerable to the cytotoxic effects of chemotherapy agents. 5-fluorouracil has been demonstrated to reduce the viability of neural progenitor cells by 55–70% at concentrations of 1 μM, whereas cancer cell lines exposed to 1 μM of 5-fluorouracil were unaffected. Other chemotherapy agents such as BCNU, cisplatin, and cytarabine also displayed toxicity to progenitor cells in vivo and in vitro. This is a concern because neural progenitor cells are the major dividing cell population in the brain, giving rise to neurons and glia.

Due to the critical role the hippocampus plays in memory, it has been the focus of various studies involving post-chemotherapy cognitive impairment. The hippocampus is one of the rare areas of the brain that exhibits neurogenesis. These new neurons created by the hippocampus are important for memory and learning and require a brain-derived neurotrophic factor (BDNF) to form. 5-fluorouracil, a commonly used chemotherapy agent, has been shown to significantly reduce the levels of BDNF in the hippocampus of the rat. Methotrexate, an agent widely used in the chemotherapy treatment of breast cancer, has also displayed a long-lasting dose dependent decrease in hippocampal cell proliferation in the rat following a single intravenous injection of the drug. This evidence suggests that chemotherapy agent toxicity to cells in the hippocampus may be partially responsible for the memory declines experienced by some patients.

Deficits in visuo-spatial, visual-motor, and visual memory functions are among the symptoms seen in post-chemotherapy patients. There is evidence that this may be due to damage to the visual system rather than caused by cognitive deficits. In one study, 5-flouracil caused ocular toxicity in 25–38% of patients treated with the drug. Methotrexate also caused ocular toxicity in 25% of patients within 2–7 days of initial chemotherapy regimen with the drug. This evidence suggests that some of the visual-based cognitive deficits experienced by cancer survivors may be due to damage at the ocular level rather than cognitive processing, but most likely it is due to a synergistic effect on both systems.

== Management ==
Hypothesized treatment options include the use of antioxidants, cognitive behavioral therapy, erythropoietin and stimulant drugs such as methylphenidate, though as the mechanism of PCCI is not well understood the potential treatment options are equally theoretical. Patients who engage in cognitive behavioral therapy to treat CRCI routinely report improved symptoms, and studies have shown self-reported improvement of depression, anxiety, fatigue and cognitive complaints. A specific form of CBT shown to have successful improvement of cognitive impairment is Memory and Attention Adaptation Training, which mostly focuses on working memory and has reported high satisfaction by patients and increase in quality of life. While these physical and mental forms of management for PCCI symptoms show subjective improvements, they are less supported in regards to objective assessment and still require further testing.

Modafinil, approved for narcolepsy, has been used off-label in trials with people with symptoms of PCCI. Modafinil is a wakefulness-promoting agent that can improve alertness and concentration, and studies have shown it to be effective at least among women treated for breast cancer.

While estrogen hormone supplementation may reverse the symptoms of PCCI in women treated for breast cancer, this carries health risks, including possibly promoting the proliferation of estrogen-responsive breast cancer cells.

There are other proposed forms of managing PCCI symptoms, one being physical activity. Studies have shown that when compared with control groups, breast cancer patients with a diagnosis within the last two years, who were a part of the exercise trial group, experienced improved processing speed and reduction in cognitive symptoms. Additionally, yoga and meditation have been seen to improve cognitive flexibility and attention, as well as decrease some of the other psychological stressors that contribute to cognitive complaints such as anxiety and depression.

== Objective and subjective measures ==
When measuring cancer related cognitive impairments, there are both objective and subjective measures. Objective measures of CRCI include neuropsychological tests of cognitive function, while subjective tests include self-reported data such as survey's and interviews. A controversy in PCCI that presents trouble for researchers is the significant difference between objectively assessed cognitive impairment and levels of self-reported cognitive impairment in patients. Data shows that as few as 12% of cancer survivors may objectively experience mild cognitive impairment while 80% of the same population subjectively reported impairments. An explanation for the differences between objective and subjective measures may be due to confounding factors that influence complaints and cognitive struggles in subjective reports, such as emotional distress, anxiety, depression and fatigue. These large discrepancies cause confusion as to how common PCCI is and which cognitive functions are actually being impaired, which can have harmful impacts on the future of research for treatments and implementation of interventions. Regardless of the lack of correlation between objective and subjective measures, there are statistically significant relationships between subjective measures of cognitive impairment and executive function, attention, processing speed, visuospatial performance, response inhibition, cognitive flexibility and total cognitive performance. Both objective and subjective measures of cognitive impairment help to assess quality of life and day to day concerns for cancer patients, and therefore is important to consider in the development of treatment plans and psychological assessments.

== Prognosis ==
While frustrating, the ultimate outcome is very good: symptoms typically disappear in about four years, e.g., for breast cancer patients.

== Incidence ==
PCCI affects a subset of cancer survivors, though the overall epidemiology and prevalence is not well known and may depend on many factors. As previously mentioned, PCCI affects between 13 and 70% of the general cancer patient population.

It generally affects about 10–40% of breast cancer patients, with higher rates among pre-menopausal women and patients who receive high-dose chemotherapy. Additionally, there are high complaints of cognitive impairment in glioblastoma patients; 60–85% of patients report cancer-related cognitive impairments following surgery and adjunctive treatment.

== Research ==
Research on PCCI is limited, and studies on the subject have often been conflicting in results, in part due to differing means of assessing and defining the phenomenon, which makes comparison and synthesis difficult. Most studies have involved small samples, making generalization difficult. There has been a focus on PCCI in younger cancer patients. This makes it difficult to draw conclusions about PCCI in the elderly.

Several recent studies have advanced the field using neuroimaging techniques. In 2005, Dr. Masatoshi Inagaki used magnetic resonance imaging (MRI) to measure differences in brain volume between breast cancer patients exposed to chemotherapy and subjects unexposed. Subjects were tested at two periods: one year after surgery, and again at three years post-surgery. Results from the first year study found smaller volumes of gray and white matter in patients exposed to chemotherapy. However, in the three-year study, both groups of breast cancer survivors were observed to have similar gray and white matter volumes. Altered brain structure in chemotherapy patients provides explanation for cognitive impairment.

Another study in 2007 investigated the differences in brain structure between two adult, monozygotic twin females. One underwent chemotherapy treatment for breast cancer, while the other did not have cancer and was not treated with chemotherapy. MRI scans were taken of both twins' brain while taking part in a working memory task. Results found that twin A (exposed to chemotherapy) experienced a broader spatial extent of activation in her brain than twin B (not exposed to chemotherapy). Twin A also reported a greater difficulty than twin B in completing the memory activity. The authors of this study declare that commonly chemotherapy patients will self-report cognitive complaints, although they perform within normal limits on neuropsychological tasks. MRI scans may provide evidence for this occurrence. Chemotherapy patients may require greater volume of neural circuitry to complete neuropsychological tasks compared to others.

Positron Emission Tomography (PET) is also used to study post-chemotherapy cognitive impairment. In one study in 2007, scans were taken of patients exposed to adjuvant chemotherapy. Significantly altered blood flow in the brain was found, most notably in the frontal cortex and cerebellum. The most significant difference of blood flow was found in the inferior frontal gyrus. Authors report resting metabolism in this area is associated with performance on short-term memory tasks.

While post-treatment studies suggest significant negative side effects of chemotherapy on cognition, other studies have indicated that there may be baseline vulnerability factors which could contribute to cognitive impairment development. Such factors may include menopausal status, surgery/anesthesia, stress, genetics and fatigue, among other suspected confounding variables.

== History ==
The symptoms of PCCI were recognized by researchers in the 1980s, who typically described it as mild cognitive impairment subsequent to successful cancer treatment. Some authors say that it was identified primarily in breast cancer survivor and support groups as affecting a subset of individuals treated with chemotherapy, who attributed it to the effects of the medication taken to treat their cancers.

The term chemobrain appears in publications at least as early as 1997.

== See also ==
- Cancer-related fatigue
- Menopause-related cognitive impairment
- Radiation induced cognitive decline
