= Radiation-induced cognitive decline =

Radiation-induced cognitive decline describes the possible correlation between radiation therapy and cognitive impairment. Radiation therapy is used mainly in the treatment of cancer. Radiation therapy can be used to cure, care or shrink tumors that are interfering with quality of life. Sometimes radiation therapy is used alone; other times it is used in conjunction with chemotherapy and surgery. For people with brain tumors, radiation can be an effective treatment because chemotherapy is often less effective due to the blood–brain barrier. Unfortunately for some patients, as time passes, people who received radiation therapy may begin experiencing deficits in their learning, memory, and spatial information processing abilities. The learning, memory, and spatial information processing abilities are dependent on proper hippocampus functionality. Therefore, any hippocampus dysfunction will result in deficits in learning, memory, and spatial information processing ability.

The hippocampus is one of two structures of the central nervous system where neurogenesis continues after birth. The other structure that undergoes neurogenesis is the olfactory bulb. Therefore, it has been proposed that neurogenesis plays some role in the proper functionality of the hippocampus and the olfactory bulb. To test this proposal, a group of rats with normal hippocampal neurogenesis (control) were subjected to a placement recognition exercise that required proper hippocampus function to complete. Afterwards a second group of rats (experimental) were subjected to the same exercise but in that trial their neurogenesis in the hippocampus was arrested. It was found that the experimental group was not able to distinguish between its familiar and unexplored territory. The experimental group spent more time exploring the familiar territory, while the control group spent more time exploring the new territory. The results indicate that neurogenesis in the hippocampus is important for memory and proper hippocampal functionality. Therefore, if radiation therapy inhibits neurogenesis in the hippocampus it would lead to the cognitive decline observed in patients who have received this radiation therapy.

In animal studies discussed by Monje and Palmer in "Radiation Injury and Neurogenesis", it has been proven that radiation does indeed decrease or arrest neurogenesis altogether in the hippocampus. This decrease in neurogenesis is due to apoptosis of the neurons which usually occurs after irradiation. However it has not been proven whether the apoptosis is a direct result of the radiation itself or if there are other factors that cause neuronal apoptosis, namely changes in the hippocampus micro-environment or damage to the precursor pool. Determining the exact cause of the cell apoptosis is important because then it may be possible to inhibit the apoptosis and reverse the effects of the arrested neurogenesis.

== Radiation therapy ==
Ionizing radiation is classified as a neurotoxicant. A 2004 cohort study concluded that irradiation of the brain with dose levels overlapping those imparted by computed tomography can, in at least some instances, adversely affect intellectual development.

Radiation therapy at doses around "23.4 Gy" was found to cause cognitive decline that was especially apparent in young children who underwent the treatment for cranial tumors, between the ages of 5 and 11. Studies found, for example, that the IQ of 5-year-old children declined each year after treatment by additional several IQ points, thereby the child's IQ decreased and decreased while growing older though may plateau at adulthood.

Radiation of 100 mGy to the head at infancy resulted in the beginning appearance of statistically significant cognitive-deficits in one Swedish/radiation-therapy follow-up study. Radiation of 1300-1500mGy to the head at childhood was similarly found to be roughly the threshold dose for the beginning increase in statistically significant rates of schizophrenia.

From soliciting for participants in a study and then examination of the prenatally exposed at Hiroshima & Nagasaki, those who experienced the prompt burst of ionizing radiation at the 8-15 and 16–25 week periods after gestation were to, especially in the closest survivors, have a higher rate of severe intellectual disability as well as variation in intelligence quotient (IQ) and school performance. It is uncertain, if there exists a threshold dose, under which one or more of these effects, of prenatal exposure to ionizing radiation, do not exist, though from analysis of the limited data, "0.1" Gy is suggested for both.

== Warfare ==
Adult humans receiving an acute whole body incapacitating dose (30 Gy) have their performance degraded almost immediately and become ineffective within several hours. A dose of 5.3 Gy to 8.3 Gy is considered lethal within months to half of male adults but not immediately incapacitating. Personnel exposed to this amount of radiation have their cognitive performance degraded in two to three hours. Depending on how physically demanding the tasks they must perform are, and remain in this disabled state at least two days. However, at that point they experience a recovery period and can perform non-demanding tasks for about six days, after which they relapse for about four weeks. At this time they begin exhibiting symptoms of radiation poisoning of sufficient severity to render them totally ineffective. Death follows for about half of males at approximately six weeks after exposure.

Nausea and vomiting generally occur within 24–48 hours after exposure to mild (1–2 Gy) doses of radiation. Headache, fatigue, and weakness are also seen with mild exposure.

Exposure of adults to 150−500 mSv results in the beginning observance of cerebrovascular pathology, and exposure to 300 mSv results in the beginning of the observance of neuropsychiatric and neurophysiological dose-related effects. Cumulative equivalent doses above 500 mSv of ionizing radiation to the head, were proven with epidemiological evidences to cause cerebrovascular atherosclerotic damage, thus increasing the chances of stroke in later life. The equivalent dose of 0.5 Gy (500 mGy) x-rays is 500 mSv.

== Acute ablation of precursor cells ==
Recent studies have shown that there is a decrease in neurogenesis in the hippocampus after irradiation therapy. The decrease in neurogenesis is the result of a reduction in the stem cell pool due to apoptosis. However, the question remains whether radiation therapy results in a complete ablation of the stem cell pool in the hippocampus or whether some stem cells survive. Animal studies have been performed by Monje and Palmer to determine if there is an acute ablation of the stem cell pool. In the study, rats were subjected to 10 Gy dosage of radiation. The 10 Gy radiation dosage is comparable to that used in irradiation therapy in humans. One month after the reception of the dosage, living precursor cells from these rats’ hippocampus were successfully isolated and cultured. Therefore, a complete ablation of the precursor cell pool by irradiation does not occur.

== Precursor cell integrity ==
Precursor cells may be damaged by radiation. This damage of the cells may prevent the precursor cells from differentiating into neurons and result in decreased neurogenesis. To determine whether the precursor cells are impaired in their ability to differentiate, two cultures were prepared by Fike et al. One of these cultures contained precursor cells from an irradiated rat's hippocampus and the second culture contained non-irradiated precursor cells from a rat hippocampus. The precursor cells were then observed while they continued to develop. The results indicated that the irradiated culture contained a higher number of differentiated neuron and glial cells in comparison to the control. It was also found that the ratios of glial cells to neurons in both cultures were similar. These results suggest that the radiation did not impair the precursor cells ability to differentiate into neurons and therefore neurogenesis is still possible.

== Alterations in hippocampus microenvironment ==
The microenvironment is an important component to consider for precursor survival and differentiation. It is the microenvironment that provides the signals to the precursor cells that help it survive, proliferate, and differentiate. To determine if the microenvironment is altered as a result of radiation, an animal study was performed by Fike et al. where highly enriched, BrdU labeled, non-irradiated stem cells from a rat hippocampus were implanted into a hippocampus that was irradiated one month prior. The stem cells were allowed to remain in the live rat for 3–4 weeks. Afterwards, the rat was killed and the stem cells were observed using immunohistochemistry and confocal microscopy. The results show that stem cell survival was similar to that found in a control subject (normal rat hippocampus); however, the number of neurons generated was decreased by 81%. Therefore, alterations of the microenvironment post radiation can lead to a decrease in neurogenesis.

In addition, studies mentioned by Fike et al. found that there are two main differences between the hippocampus of an irradiated rat and a non-irradiated rat that are part of the microenvironment. There was a significantly larger number of activated microglia cells in the hippocampus of irradiated rats in comparison to non-irradiated rats. The presence of microglia cells is characteristic of the inflammatory response which is most likely due to radiation exposure. Also the expected clustering of stem cells around the vasculature of the hippocampus was disrupted. Therefore, focusing on the microglial activation, inflammatory response, and microvasculature may produce a direct link to the decrease in neurogenesis post irradiation.

=== Inflammatory response affects neurogenesis ===
Radiation therapy usually results in chronic inflammation, and in the brain this inflammatory response comes in the form of activated microglia cells. Once activated, these microglia cells start to release stress hormones and various pro-inflammatory cytokines. Some of what is released by the activated microglia cells, like the glucocorticoid stress hormone, may result in a decrease in neurogenesis. To investigate this concept, an animal study was performed by Monje et al. in order to determine the specific cytokines or stress hormones that were released by activated microglial cells that decrease neurogenesis in an irradiated hippocampus. In this study, microglia cells were exposed to bacterial lipopolysaccharide to elicit an inflammatory response, thus activating the microglia cells. These activated microglia were then co-cultured with normal hippocampal neural stem cells. Also, as a control, non-activated microglia cells were co-cultured with normal hippocampal neural stem cells. In comparing the two co-cultures, it was determined that neurogenesis in the activated microglia cell culture was 50% less than in the control. A second study was also performed to ensure that the decrease in neurogenesis was the result of released cytokines and not cell-to-cell contact of microglia and stem cells. In this study, neural stem cells were cultured on preconditioned media from activated microglia cells and a comparison was made with a neural stem cells cultured on plain media. The results of this study indicated that neurogenesis also showed a similar decrease in the preconditioned media culture versus the control.

When microglia cells are activated, they release the pro-inflammatory cytokine IL-1β, TNF-α, INF-γ, and IL-6. In order to identify the cytokines that decreased neurogenesis, Monje et al. allowed progenitor cells to differentiate while exposed to each cytokine. The results of the study showed that only the recombinant IL-6 and TNF-α exposure significantly reduced neurogenesis. Then the IL-6 was inhibited and neurogenesis was restored. This implicates IL-6 as the main cytokine responsible for the decrease of neurogenesis in the hippocampus.

=== Microvasculature and neurogenesis ===
The microvasculature of the subgranular zone, located in dentate gyrus of hippocampus, plays an important role in neurogenesis. As precursor cells develop in the subgranular zone, they form clusters. These clusters usually contain dozens of cells. The clusters are made up of endothelial cells and neuronal precursor cells that have the ability to differentiate into either neurons or glia cells. With time, these clusters eventually migrate towards microvessels in the subgranular zone. As the clusters get closer to the vessels, some of the precursor cells differentiate in glia cells and eventually the remaining precursor cells will differentiate into neurons. Upon investigation of the close association between the vessels and clusters, it is apparent that the actual migration of the precursor cells to these vessels is not random. Since endothelial cells forming the vessel wall do secrete brain-derived neurotrophic factor, it is plausible that the neuronal precursor cells migrate to those regions in order to grow, survive, and differentiate. Also, since the clusters do contain endothelial cells, they might be attracted to the vascular endothelial growth factor that is released in the area of vessels to promote endothelial survival and angiogenesis. However, as noted previously, clustering along the capillaries in the subgranular zone does decrease when the brain is subject to radiation. The exact reasoning for this disruption of the close association between cluster and vessels remains unknown. It is possible that any signaling that would normally attract the clusters to the region, for example the bone-derived growth factor and the vascular endothelial growth factor, may be suppressed.

== Reversal ==
=== Blocking inflammatory cascade ===
Neurogenesis in the hippocampus usually decreases after exposure to radiation and usually leads to a cognitive decline in patients undergoing radiation therapy. As discussed above, the decrease in neurogenesis is heavily influenced by changes in the microenvironment of the hippocampus upon exposure to radiation. Specifically, disruption of the cluster/vessel association in the subgranular zone of the dentate gyrus and cytokines released by activated microglia as part of the inflammatory response do impair neurogenesis in the irradiated hippocampus. Thus several studies have used this knowledge to reverse the reduction in neurogenesis in the irradiated hippocampus. In one study, indomethacin treatment was given to the irradiated rat during and after irradiation treatment. It was found that the indomethacin treatment caused a 35% decrease in the number of activated microglia per dentate gyrus in comparison to microglia activation in irradiated rats without indomethacin treatment. This decrease in microglia activation reduces the amount of cytokines and stress-hormone release, thus reducing the effect of the inflammatory response. When the number of precursor cells adopting a neuronal fate was quantified, it was determined that the ratio of neurons to glia cells increased. This increase in neurogenesis was only 20-25% of that observed in control animals. However, in this study the inflammatory response was not eliminated entirely, and some cytokines or stress hormones continued to be secreted by the remaining activated microglia cells causing the reduction in neurogenesis. In a second study, the inflammatory cascade was also blocked at another stage. This study focused mainly on the c-Jun NH2 – terminal kinase pathway which when activated results in the apoptosis of neurons. This pathway was chosen because, upon irradiation, it is the only mitogen-activated protein kinase that is activated. The mitogen-activated protein kinases are important for regulation of migration, proliferation, differentiation, and apoptosis. The JNK pathway is activated by cytokines released by activated microglia cells, and blocking this pathway significantly reduces neuronal apoptosis. In the study, the JNK was inhibited using 5 μM SP600125 dosage, and this resulted in a decrease of neural stem cells apoptosis. This decrease in apoptosis results in increased neuronal recovery.

=== Environmental enrichment ===
In previous work, environmental enrichment has been used to determine its effect on brain activity. In these studies, the environmental enrichment has positively impacted the brain functionality in both normal, healthy animals and animals that had suffered severe brain injury. It has already been shown by Elodie Bruel-Jungerman et al. that subjecting animals to learning exercises that are heavily dependent on the hippocampus results in increased neurogenesis. Therefore, the question of whether environmental enrichment can enhance neurogenesis in an irradiated hippocampus is raised. In a study performed by Fan et al., the effects of environmental enrichment on gerbils were tested. There were four groups of gerbils used for this experiment, where group one consisted on non-irradiated animals that lived in a standard environment, group two were non-irradiated animals that lived in an enriched environment, group three were irradiated animals that lived in a standard environment, and group four were irradiated animals that lived in an enriched environment. After two months of maintaining the gerbils in the required environments, they were killed and hippocampal tissue was removed for analysis. It was found that the number of precursor neurons that were differentiated into neurons from group four (irradiated and enriched environment) was significantly more than group three (irradiated and standard environment). Similarly, the number of neuron precursor cells was more in group two (non-irradiated and enriched environment), in comparison to group one (non-irradiated and standard environment). The results indicate that neurogenesis was increased in the animals that were exposed to the enriched environment, in comparison to animals in the standard environment. This outcome indicates that environmental enrichment can indeed increase neurogenesis and reverse the cognitive decline.

== See also ==
- Post-chemotherapy cognitive impairment
- Targeted therapy
- Electrochemotherapy
- Electro therapy
- Chemotherapy
- Radiotherapy
