= Streptothricin =

Streptothricins
- Streptothricin F

Identifiers
CAS Number	D: 3776-36-1; E: 3776-38-3; F: 3808-42-2
3D model (JSmol)	A: Interactive image; B: Interactive image; C: Interactive image; D: Interactive image; E: Interactive image; F: Interactive image
ChEBI	E: CHEBI:67576; F: CHEBI:26789
ChEMBL	D: ChEMBL4447098; E: ChEMBL1801945; F: ChEMBL4448608
ChemSpider	A: 172163; B: 172164; C: 144791; D: 26332017; E: 141218; F: 170645
KEGG	F: C19785
PubChem CID	C: 165157; E: 160718; F: 197034
UNII	A: FN9M3E885Z
CompTox Dashboard (EPA)	E: DTXSID70929491; F: DTXSID20191489
- InChI: A: InChI=1S/C49H94N18O13/c50-13-1-7-27(51)19-35(70)58-14-2-8-28(52)20-36(71)59-15-3-9-29(53)21-37(72)60-16-4-10-30(54)22-38(73)61-17-5-11-31(55)23-39(74)62-18-6-12-32(56)24-40(75)64-43-44(76)45(80-48(57)78)34(26-68)79-47(43)67-49-65-41-33(69)25-63-46(77)42(41)66-49/h27-34,41-45,47,68-69,76H,1-26,50-56H2,(H2,57,78)(H,58,70)(H,59,71)(H,60,72)(H,61,73)(H,62,74)(H,63,77)(H,64,75)(H2,65,66,67)/t27-,28-,29-,30-,31-,32-,33+,34+,41+,42-,43+,44-,45-,47+/m0/s1 Key: CTKOCMSLRIIOBG-JMSRUVCGSA-N; B: InChI=1S/C43H82N16O12/c44-11-1-6-23(45)16-30(62)51-12-2-7-24(46)17-31(63)52-13-3-8-25(47)18-32(64)53-14-4-9-26(48)19-33(65)54-15-5-10-27(49)20-34(66)56-37-38(67)39(71-42(50)69)29(22-60)70-41(37)59-43-57-35-28(61)21-55-40(68)36(35)58-43/h23-29,35-39,41,60-61,67H,1-22,44-49H2,(H2,50,69)(H,51,62)(H,52,63)(H,53,64)(H,54,65)(H,55,68)(H,56,66)(H2,57,58,59)/t23-,24-,25-,26-,27-,28+,29+,35+,36-,37+,38-,39-,41+/m0/s1 Key: SFBVRPSSMVXTDR-PTESPJIQSA-N; C: InChI=1S/C37H70N14O11/c38-9-1-5-19(39)13-25(54)44-10-2-6-20(40)14-26(55)45-11-3-7-21(41)15-27(56)46-12-4-8-22(42)16-28(57)48-31-32(58)33(62-36(43)60)24(18-52)61-35(31)51-37-49-29-23(53)17-47-34(59)30(29)50-37/h19-24,29-33,35,52-53,58H,1-18,38-42H2,(H2,43,60)(H,44,54)(H,45,55)(H,46,56)(H,47,59)(H,48,57)(H2,49,50,51)/t19-,20-,21-,22-,23+,24+,29+,30-,31+,32-,33-,35+/m0/s1 Key: UZMKRCMBWWXPBP-CSVBCEEXSA-N; D: InChI=1S/C31H58N12O10/c32-7-1-4-15(33)10-20(46)37-8-2-5-16(34)11-21(47)38-9-3-6-17(35)12-22(48)40-25-26(49)27(53-30(36)51)19(14-44)52-29(25)43-31-41-23-18(45)13-39-28(50)24(23)42-31/h15-19,23-27,29,44-45,49H,1-14,32-35H2,(H2,36,51)(H,37,46)(H,38,47)(H,39,50)(H,40,48)(H2,41,42,43)/t15-,16-,17-,18+,19+,23+,24-,25+,26-,27-,29+/m0/s1 Key: WUJTXMVGXDQPNN-OTQKCRDJSA-N; E: InChI=1S/C25H46N10O9/c26-5-1-3-11(27)7-15(38)30-6-2-4-12(28)8-16(39)32-19-20(40)21(44-24(29)42)14(10-36)43-23(19)35-25-33-17-13(37)9-31-22(41)18(17)34-25/h11-14,17-21,23,36-37,40H,1-10,26-28H2,(H2,29,42)(H,30,38)(H,31,41)(H,32,39)(H2,33,34,35)/t11-,12-,13+,14+,17+,18-,19+,20-,21-,23+/m0/s1 Key: SCHKAKNJXBPJHD-SNQQVPMJSA-N; F: InChI=1S/C19H34N8O8/c20-3-1-2-7(21)4-10(30)24-13-14(31)15(35-18(22)33)9(6-28)34-17(13)27-19-25-11-8(29)5-23-16(32)12(11)26-19/h7-9,11-15,17,28-29,31H,1-6,20-21H2,(H2,22,33)(H,23,32)(H,24,30)(H2,25,26,27)/t7-,8+,9+,11+,12-,13+,14-,15-,17+/m0/s1 Key: NRAUADCLPJTGSF-VLSXYIQESA-N
- SMILES: A: NCCC[C@H](N)CC(=O)NCCC[C@H](N)CC(=O)NCCC[C@H](N)CC(=O)NCCC[C@H](N)CC(=O)NCCC[C@H](N)CC(=O)NCCC[C@H](N)CC(=O)N[C@@H]1[C@H](O)[C@@H](OC(N)=O)[C@@H](CO)O[C@H]1NC1=N[C@@H]2C(=O)NC[C@@H](O)[C@H]2N1; B: NCCC[C@H](N)CC(=O)NCCC[C@H](N)CC(=O)NCCC[C@H](N)CC(=O)NCCC[C@H](N)CC(=O)NCCC[C@H](N)CC(=O)N[C@@H]1[C@H](O)[C@@H](OC(N)=O)[C@@H](CO)O[C@H]1NC1=N[C@@H]2C(=O)NC[C@@H](O)[C@H]2N1; C: C1[C@H]([C@@H]2[C@@H](C(=O)N1)N=C(N2)N[C@H]3[C@@H]([C@@H]([C@H]([C@H](O3)CO)OC(=O)N)O)NC(=O)C[C@H](CCCNC(=O)C[C@H](CCCNC(=O)C[C@H](CCCNC(=O)C[C@H](CCCN)N)N)N)N)O; D: NCCC[C@H](N)CC(=O)NCCC[C@H](N)CC(=O)NCCC[C@H](N)CC(=O)N[C@@H]1[C@H](O)[C@@H](OC(N)=O)[C@@H](CO)O[C@H]1/N=C1\N[C@@H]2[C@H](O)CNC(=O)[C@H]2N1; E: C1[C@H]([C@@H]2[C@@H](C(=O)N1)N=C(N2)N[C@H]3[C@@H]([C@@H]([C@H]([C@H](O3)CO)OC(=O)N)O)NC(=O)C[C@H](CCCNC(=O)C[C@H](CCCN)N)N)O; F: C1[C@H]([C@@H]2[C@@H](C(=O)N1)N=C(N2)N[C@H]3[C@@H]([C@@H]([C@H]([C@H](O3)CO)OC(=O)N)O)NC(=O)C[C@H](CCCN)N)O
- Except where otherwise noted, data are given for materials in their standard state (at 25 °C [77 °F], 100 kPa). Infobox references

Streptothricins are a group of antibiotics in the aminoglycoside class. The first antibiotic in the group was isolated from Streptomyces lavendulae in 1942. It was later determined to be a mixture of closely related compounds, and is now known as nourseothricin. Although initial interest was positive because it appeared to be the first broad-spectrum antibiotic, meaning it was effective against both Gram-positive and Gram-negative bacteria, it never found clinical use due to toxicity. However, because of the increasing need for new antibiotics due to resistance to existing antibiotics, there is a current interest in developing new drugs based on the chemical scaffold of the streptothricins.
