= Indole-5,6-quinone =

- Chemical structure of indole-5,6-quinone

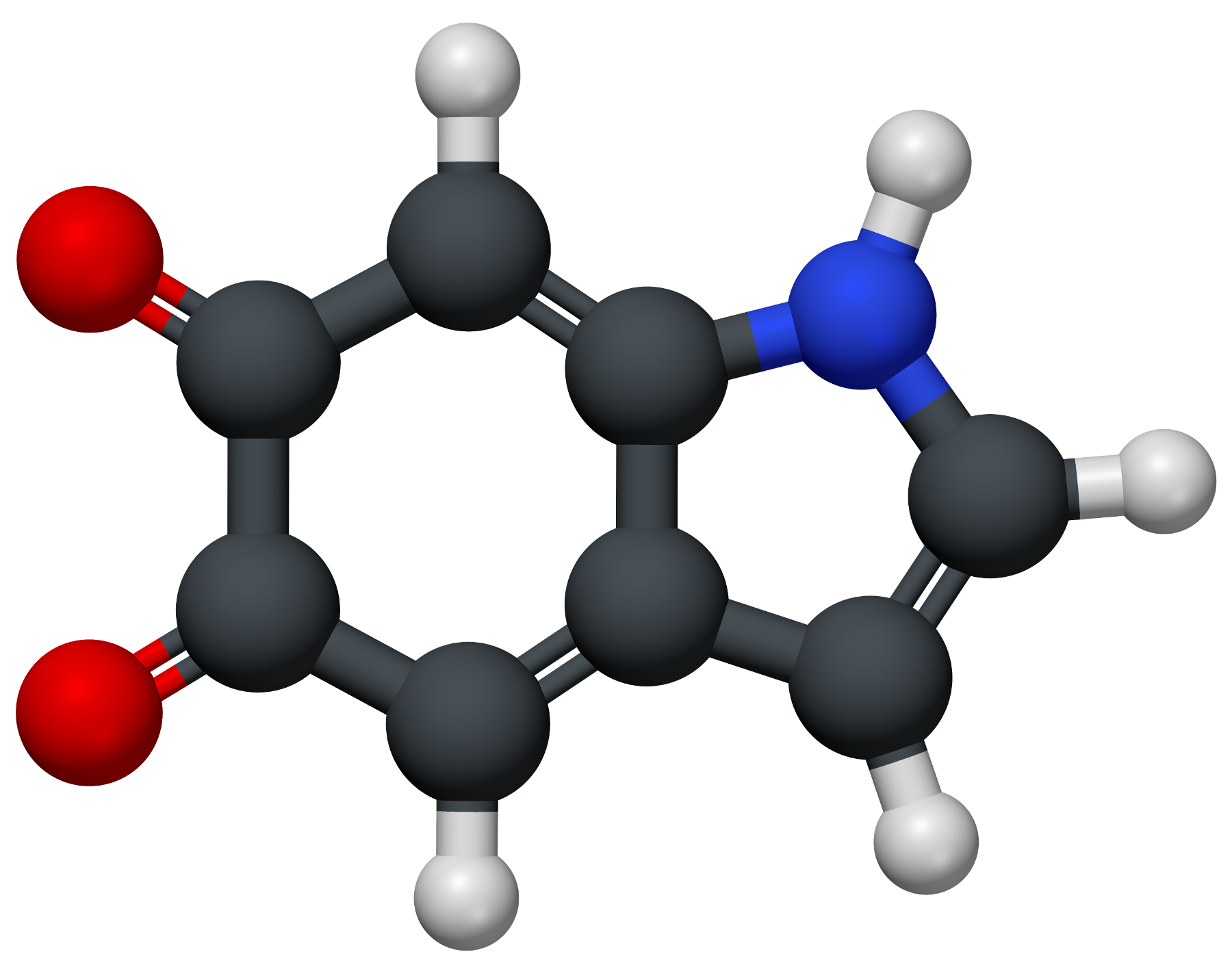
- Molecular model of indole-5,6-quinone

Names
- Preferred IUPAC name 1H-Indole-5,6-dione

Identifiers
CAS Number	582-59-2
3D model (JSmol)	Interactive image
ChEBI	CHEBI:27406
ChemSpider	389600
KEGG	C05579
PubChem CID	440728
UNII	SE4DX7HKA2
CompTox Dashboard (EPA)	DTXSID90331517
- InChI: InChI=1S/C8H5NO2/c10-7-3-5-1-2-9-6(5)4-8(7)11/h1-4,9H Key: IGGVVGHJSQSLFO-UHFFFAOYSA-N; InChI=1/C8H5NO2/c10-7-3-5-1-2-9-6(5)4-8(7)11/h1-4,9H Key: IGGVVGHJSQSLFO-UHFFFAOYAN
- SMILES: C1=CNC2=CC(=O)C(=O)C=C21

Properties
Chemical formula	C_{8}H_{5}NO_{2}
Molar mass	147.13 g/mol
- Except where otherwise noted, data are given for materials in their standard state (at 25 °C [77 °F], 100 kPa). verify (what is ?) Infobox references

Indole-5,6-quinone is an indolequinone, a chemical compound found in the oxidative browning reaction of fruits like bananas where it is mediated by the tyrosinase type polyphenol oxidase from tyrosine and catecholamines leading to the formation of catechol melanin. Like many quinones it can undergo redox reactions via the corresponding 5,6-dihydroxyindole.

== See also ==
- Dopachrome
