= Nourseothricin =

- n=1-4

Names
- IUPAC name [(2R,3S,4R,5R,6R)-6-[[(3aS,7R,7aS)-7-hydroxy-4-oxo-1,3a,5,6,7,7a-hexahydroimidazo[4,5-c]pyridin-2-yl]amino]-5-[[(3S)-3,6-diaminohexanoyl]amino]-4-hydroxy-2-(hydroxymethyl)oxan-3-yl] carbamate

Identifiers
| CAS Number | 56089-12-4; 96736-11-7 (sulfate) |
| 3D model (JSmol) | Interactive image |
| ChEMBL | ChEMBL2334879 |
| ChemSpider | 29418395 |
| PubChem CID | 71720685 |
- InChI: InChI=1S/C19H34N8O8/c20-3-1-2-7(21)4-10(30)24-13-14(31)15(35-18(22)33)9(6-28)34-17(13)27-19-25-11-8(29)5-23-16(32)12(11)26-19/h7-9,11-15,17,28-29,31H,1-6,20-21H2,(H2,22,33)(H,23,32)(H,24,30)(H2,25,26,27)/t7-,8+,9+,11+,12-,13+,14+,15+,17+/m0/s1 Key: NRAUADCLPJTGSF-ZPGVOIKOSA-N
- SMILES: C1[C@H]([C@@H]2[C@@H](C(=O)N1)N=C(N2)N[C@H]3[C@@H]([C@H]([C@@H]([C@H](O3)CO)OC(=O)N)O)NC(=O)C[C@H](CCCN)N)O

Properties
| Chemical formula | C_{19}H_{34}N_{8}O_{8} |
| Molar mass | 502.529 g·mol^{−1} |
| Solubility in water | ~ 1 g/L |
- Except where otherwise noted, data are given for materials in their standard state (at 25 °C [77 °F], 100 kPa). Infobox references

Nourseothricin (NTC) is a member of the streptothricin-class of aminoglycoside antibiotics produced by Streptomyces species. Chemically, NTC is a mixture of the related compounds streptothricin C, D, E, and F. NTC inhibits protein synthesis by inducing miscoding. It is used as a selection marker for a wide range of organisms including bacteria, yeast, filamentous fungi, and plant cells. It is not known to have adverse side-effects on positively selected cells, a property cardinal to a selection drug.

Streptothricin F is effective against highly drug-resistant gram-negative bacteria, including carbapenem-resistant E. coli.

NTC can be inactivated by nourseothricin N-acetyl transferase (NAT) from Streptomyces noursei, an enzyme that acetylates the beta-amino group of the beta-lysine residue of NTC. NAT can thus act as an antibiotic resistance gene.

== Properties ==
NTC is highly soluble in water (~ 1 g/mL) and stable in solution for 2 years at 4 °C.
