= Mitosene =

Class of organic chemicals

Chemical structure of mitosene

The mitosenes are a class of organic chemicals based on a quinone-containing three-ring structure related to the two-ring core of the indolequinones. They are derived from the mitomycins by reduction and are the active alkylating agents responsible for the antitumor activity of the mitomycins.
