= ALDH6A1 =

Protein-coding gene in the species Homo sapiens

An Error has occurred retrieving Wikidata item for infobox Methylmalonate-semialdehyde dehydrogenase [acylating], mitochondrial (MMSDH) is an enzyme that in humans is encoded by the ALDH6A1 gene.

This protein belongs to the aldehyde dehydrogenases family of proteins. This enzyme plays a role in the valine and pyrimidine catabolic pathways. The product of this gene, a mitochondrial methylmalonate semialdehyde dehydrogenase, catalyzes the irreversible oxidative decarboxylation of malonate and methylmalonate semialdehydes to acetyl- and propionyl-CoA. Methylmalonate semialdehyde dehydrogenase deficiency is characterized by elevated beta-alanine, 3-hydroxypropionic acid, and both isomers of 3-amino and 3-hydroxyisobutyric acids in urine organic acids. Methylmalonate semialdehyde dehydrogenase deficiency is caused by mutations in this gene and the resulting protein.

== Structure ==
The ALDH6A1 gene is mapped onto 14q24.3, between markers D14S71 and D14S986, and has an exon count of 12. The mRNA expression levels of this gene are highest in the kidney and liver, although mRNA levels have been found in many other tissues. The mature protein that this gene translates in humans is 503 amino acids long, which is similar to other enzymes of this family, which all comprise around 500 amino acids. This enzyme localizes to the mitochondria. Unlike other mitochondrial entry sequences, this does not contain as many arginine residues, and is in fact slightly longer.

== Function ==
MMSDH has esterase activity, which is characteristic of the enzymes in the Aldehyde Dehydrogenase family. It is more specifically involved in the valine and thymine catabolism pathways. When the enzyme acts on valine, (S)-3-hydroxyisobutyric acid is generated as an intermediate; this then undergoes oxidation by the enzyme 3-hydroxyisobutyrate dehydrogenase to form (S)-methylmalonic semialdehyde (MMSA). In thymine catabolism, the enzymatic reaction produces (R)-aminoisobutyric acid (AIBA), which is then deaminated to (R)-methylmalonic semialdehyde. These two enantiomers of MMSA are substrates for MMSDH, which catalyzes their oxidative decarboxylation to propionyl-CoA. Both NAD+ and CoA act as cofactors with the enzyme, although they work in opposite directions; NAD+ works to protect the enzyme against proteolysis, but CoA esters diminish that effect.

== Clinical significance ==
Mutations in the ALDH6A1 gene are associated with methylmalonate semialdehyde dehydrogenase deficiency, a rare autosomal recessive inborn error of metabolism with a highly variable phenotype. The disease is passed through autosomal recessive genetics. There have been many individual and familial case studies of this deficiency and the mutations that cause it. Some patients with this disease may be asymptomatic, whereas others show global developmental delay, nonspecific dysmorphic features, and delayed myelination on brain imaging. Meanwhile, some cases have been only identified through elevated levels of various acidic metabolites in the urine, notably 3-hydroxyisobutyric acid. This can result from an identified a homozygous 1336G-A transition in the gene, resulting in a change in the 446th residue from glycine to arginine. Another case study, a child from consanguineous patients, presented as significant hypotonia in infancy, poor feeding, and dysmorphic facial features, including narrowed, downslanting palpebral fissures, short convex nose with depressed nasal bridge, microphthalmia, cataracts, and adducted thumbs. Brain imaging showed delayed myelination and thinning of the corpus callosum. Laboratory studies showed 3-hydroxyisobutyric aciduria and mild lactic acidosis. Many case studies since then have presented similar symptoms, although the symptoms may be milder. The mutations identified are generally heterozygous missense mutations: S262Y, P62S, Y172H and R535C.
