= Agrocybin =

Names
- IUPAC name 8-hydroxyocta-2,4,6-triynamide
- Other names 8-Hydroxy-2,4,6-octatriynamide; 2,4,6-Octatriynamide, 8-hydroxy-

Identifiers
CAS Number	544-44-5
3D model (JSmol)	Interactive image
ChEMBL	ChEMBL1967731
ChemSpider	10538
PubChem CID	11004
UNII	A0AFV4JUIT
CompTox Dashboard (EPA)	DTXSID20202786
- InChI: InChI=1S/C8H5NO2/c9-8(11)6-4-2-1-3-5-7-10/h10H,7H2,(H2,9,11) Key: OXONWCQUZYDTNF-UHFFFAOYSA-N
- SMILES: C(C#CC#CC#CC(=O)N)O

Properties
Chemical formula	C_{8}H_{5}NO_{2}
Molar mass	147.133 g·mol^{−1}
Appearance	Solid
Melting point	130–140 °C (266–284 °F; 403–413 K)

Hazards
- Lethal dose or concentration (LD, LC)
LD_{50} (median dose)	6 mg/kg (IV, mice); 60 mg/kg (oral, mice)
- Except where otherwise noted, data are given for materials in their standard state (at 25 °C [77 °F], 100 kPa). Infobox references

Agrocybin is a toxic polyyne amide found in certain mushrooms, notably in the genus Agrocybe (especially Agrocybe dura) and in Marasmius oreades. It exhibits cytotoxic, immunosuppressive, trypanocidal, antibacterial, as well as potent antifungal and antiluminescent activities.
