= Methylmalonic acid semialdehyde =

Names
- Preferred IUPAC name 2-Methyl-3-oxopropanoic acid
- Other names Methylmalonate semialdehyde

Identifiers
| CAS Number | 6236-08-4 |
| 3D model (JSmol) | Interactive image; Interactive image |
| ChEBI | CHEBI:16256 |
| ChemSpider | 290 |
| KEGG | C00349 |
| PubChem CID | 296 |
| UNII | 036CTC7X1V |
| CompTox Dashboard (EPA) | DTXSID60274265 |
- InChI: InChI=1S/C4H6O3/c1-3(2-5)4(6)7/h2-3H,1H3,(H,6,7) Key: VOKUMXABRRXHAR-UHFFFAOYSA-N; InChI=1/C4H6O3/c1-3(2-5)4(6)7/h2-3H,1H3,(H,6,7) Key: VOKUMXABRRXHAR-UHFFFAOYAB
- SMILES: CC(C=O)C(=O)O; O=CC(C(=O)O)C

Properties
| Chemical formula | C_{4}H_{6}O_{3} |
| Molar mass | 102.089 g·mol^{−1} |
- Except where otherwise noted, data are given for materials in their standard state (at 25 °C [77 °F], 100 kPa). Infobox references

Methylmalonic acid semialdehyde is an intermediate in the metabolism of thymine and valine. It is a substrate of the enzyme methylmalonate-semialdehyde dehydrogenase (acylating), which converts it to propionyl-CoA.

Methylmalonic acid semialdehyde
+ CoA + NAD^{+}
CO_{2} + H^{+}
CO_{2} + H^{+}
Propionyl-CoA
+ NADH
