= 3-Hydroxyisobutyric acid =

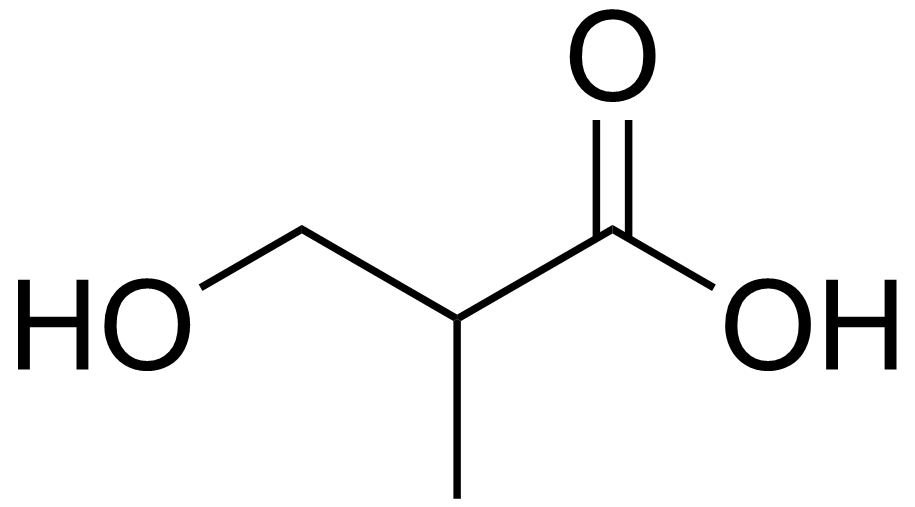

Names
- Preferred IUPAC name 3-Hydroxy-2-methylpropanoic acid
- Other names 3-Hydroxyisobutyric acid

Identifiers
CAS Number	2068-83-9
3D model (JSmol)	Interactive image; Interactive image
Beilstein Reference	1745484
ChEBI	CHEBI:18064
ChemSpider	85
ECHA InfoCard	100.254.271
EC Number	819-819-7
KEGG	C01188
PubChem CID	87
UNII	K75C8JDF5W
CompTox Dashboard (EPA)	DTXSID20862824
- InChI: InChI=1S/C4H8O3/c1-3(2-5)4(6)7/h3,5H,2H2,1H3,(H,6,7) Key: DBXBTMSZEOQQDU-UHFFFAOYSA-N; InChI=1/C4H8O3/c1-3(2-5)4(6)7/h3,5H,2H2,1H3,(H,6,7) Key: DBXBTMSZEOQQDU-UHFFFAOYAC
- SMILES: OC(C(C)CO)=O; O=C(O)C(C)CO

Properties
Chemical formula	C_{4}H_{8}O_{3}
Molar mass	104.10 g/mol
- Except where otherwise noted, data are given for materials in their standard state (at 25 °C [77 °F], 100 kPa). verify (what is ?) Infobox references

3-Hydroxyisobutyric acid (or 3-hydroxy-2-methylpropanoic acid) is an intermediate in the metabolism of valine. It is a chiral compound having two enantiomers, D-3-hydroxyisobutyric acid and L-3-hydroxyisobutyric acid.

== See also ==
- 2-hydroxybutyric acid
- 3-hydroxyisobutyrate dehydrogenase
