= Streptomyces caespitosus =

Scientific classification
- Domain: Bacteria
- Kingdom: Bacillati
- Phylum: Actinomycetota
- Class: Actinomycetes
- Order: Streptomycetales
- Family: Streptomycetaceae
- Genus: Streptomyces
- Species: S. caespitosus

Binomial name
- Streptomyces caespitosus Sugawara and Hata 1956

Species of bacterium

Streptomyces caespitosus is a species of actinobacteria. It produces chemotherapeutic drug mitomycin C.
