= Methylmalonate-semialdehyde dehydrogenase (acylating) =

Class of enzymes

methylmalonate-semialdehyde dehydrogenase (acylating)
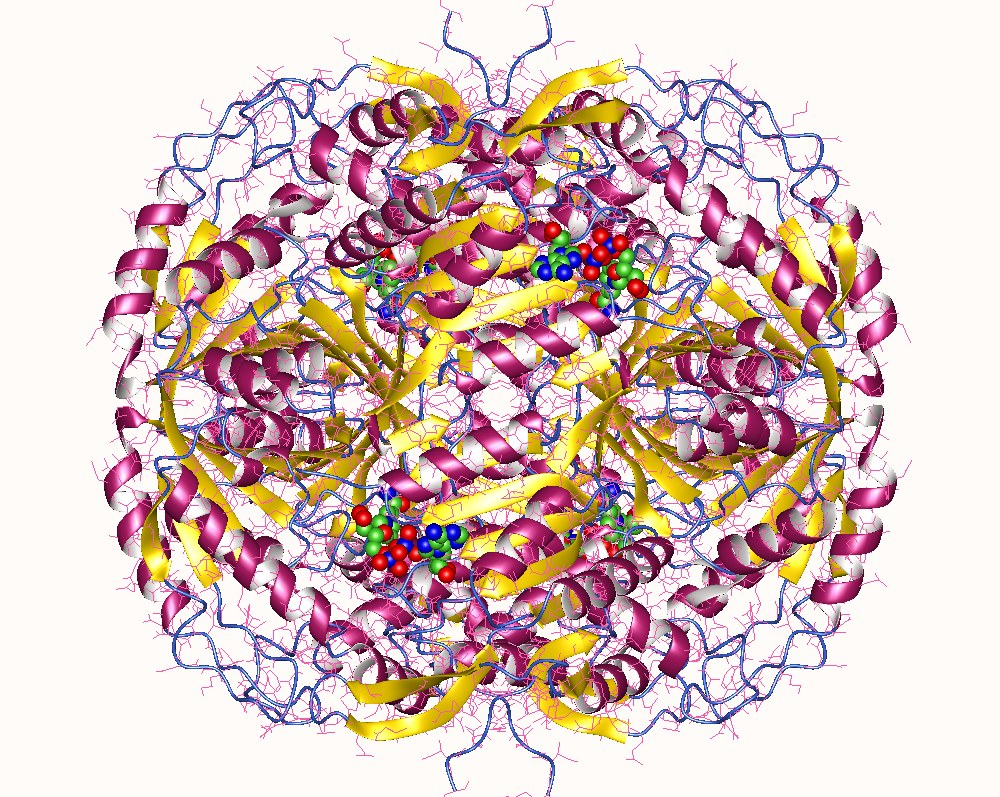
- Methylmalonate semialdehyde dehydrogenase tetramer, Bacillus subtilis

Identifiers
- EC no.: 1.2.1.27
- CAS no.: 37205-49-5

Databases
- IntEnz: IntEnz view
- BRENDA: BRENDA entry
- ExPASy: NiceZyme view
- KEGG: KEGG entry
- MetaCyc: metabolic pathway
- PRIAM: profile
- PDB structures: RCSB PDB PDBe PDBsum
- Gene Ontology: AmiGO / QuickGO
Search
- PMC: articles
- PubMed: articles
- NCBI: proteins

In enzymology, methylmalonate-semialdehyde dehydrogenase (acylating) (EC 1.2.1.27) is an enzyme that catalyzes the chemical reaction

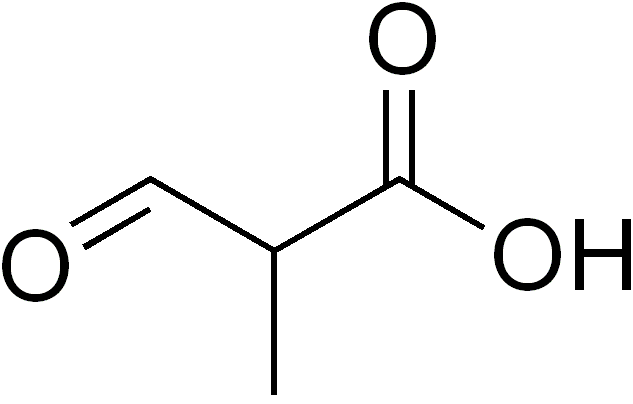
Methylmalonic acid semialdehyde
+ CoA + NAD^{+}
CO_{2} + H^{+}
CO_{2} + H^{+}
Propionyl-CoA
+ NADH

The three substrates of this enzyme are methylmalonic acid semialdehyde, coenzyme A (CoA), and oxidised nicotinamide adenine dinucleotide (NAD^{+}). Its products are propionyl-CoA, carbon dioxide, reduced NADH, and a proton.

This enzyme belongs to the family of oxidoreductases, specifically those acting on the aldehyde or oxo group of donor with NAD+ or NADP+ as acceptor. The systematic name of this enzyme class is 2-methyl-3-oxopropanoate:NAD+ 3-oxidoreductase (CoA-propanoylating). Other names in common use include MSDH, and MMSA dehydrogenase. This enzyme participates in 3 metabolic pathways: inositol metabolism, valine, leucine and isoleucine degradation, and propanoate metabolism.

== Structural studies ==
As of late 2007, only one structure has been solved for this class of enzymes, with the PDB accession code 1T90.
