= Hawkinsinuria =

- Other names: 4-Alpha-hydroxyphenylpyruvate hydroxylase deficiency
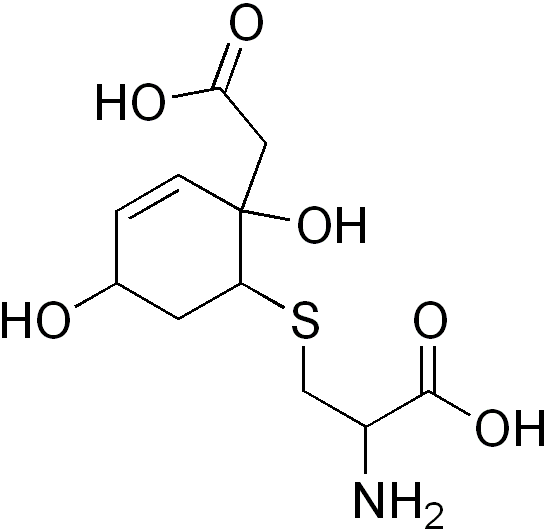
- Hawkinsin
- Specialty: Endocrinology

Hawkinsinuria is an autosomal dominant metabolic disorder affecting the metabolism of tyrosine.

Normally, the breakdown of the amino acid tyrosine involves the conversion of 4-hydroxyphenylpyruvate to homogentisate by 4-hydroxyphenylpyruvate dioxygenase. Complete deficiency of this enzyme would lead to tyrosinemia III. In rare cases, however, the enzyme is still able to produce the reactive intermediate 1,2-epoxyphenyl acetic acid, but is unable to convert this intermediate to homogentisate. The intermediate then spontaneously reacts with glutathione to form 2-L-cystein-S-yl-1,4-dihydroxy-cyclohex-5-en-1-yl acetic acid (hawkinsin).

Patients present with metabolic acidosis during the first year of life, and growth arrest around the time of weaning off breast milk. Treatment involves a diet containing a low amount of phenylalanine and tyrosine. Tolerance toward these amino acids normalizes as the patients get older. Then only a chlorine-like smell of the urine indicates the presence of the condition. Patients have a normal life and do not require treatment or a special diet.

The production of hawkinsin is the result of a gain-of-function mutation. Inheritance of hawkinsinuria is therefore autosomal dominant (presence of a single mutated copy of the gene causes the condition). The gene affected is the HPD gene encoding 4-hydroxyphenylpyruvic acid dioxygenase, on chromosome 12q24. It is unusual in that most other inborn errors of metabolism are caused by loss-of-function mutations, and hence have recessive inheritance (condition occurs only if both copies are mutated).

== See also ==
- 4-Hydroxyphenylpyruvate dioxygenase
