= Valine =

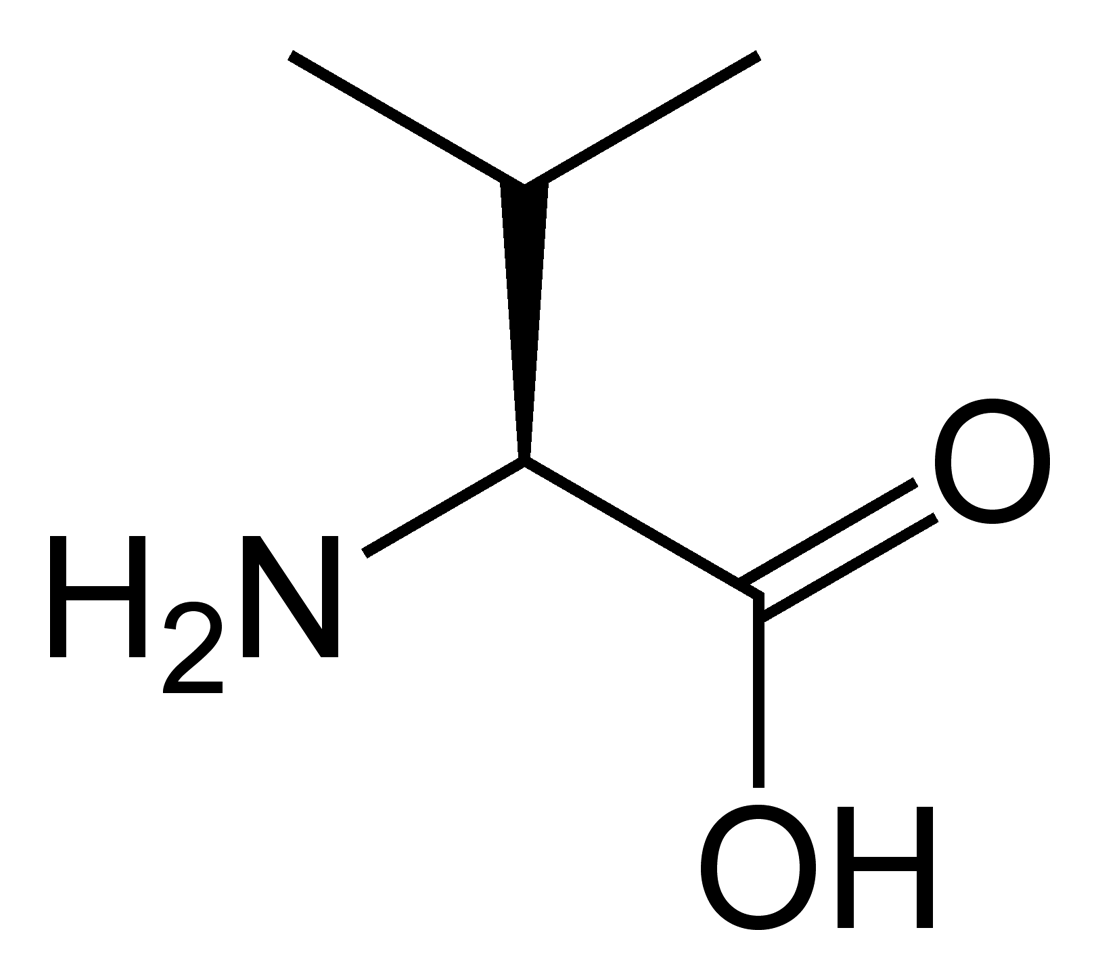
Skeletal formula of neutral valine
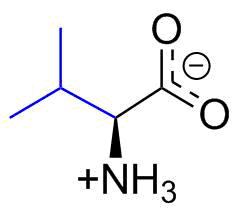
Zwitterionic valine
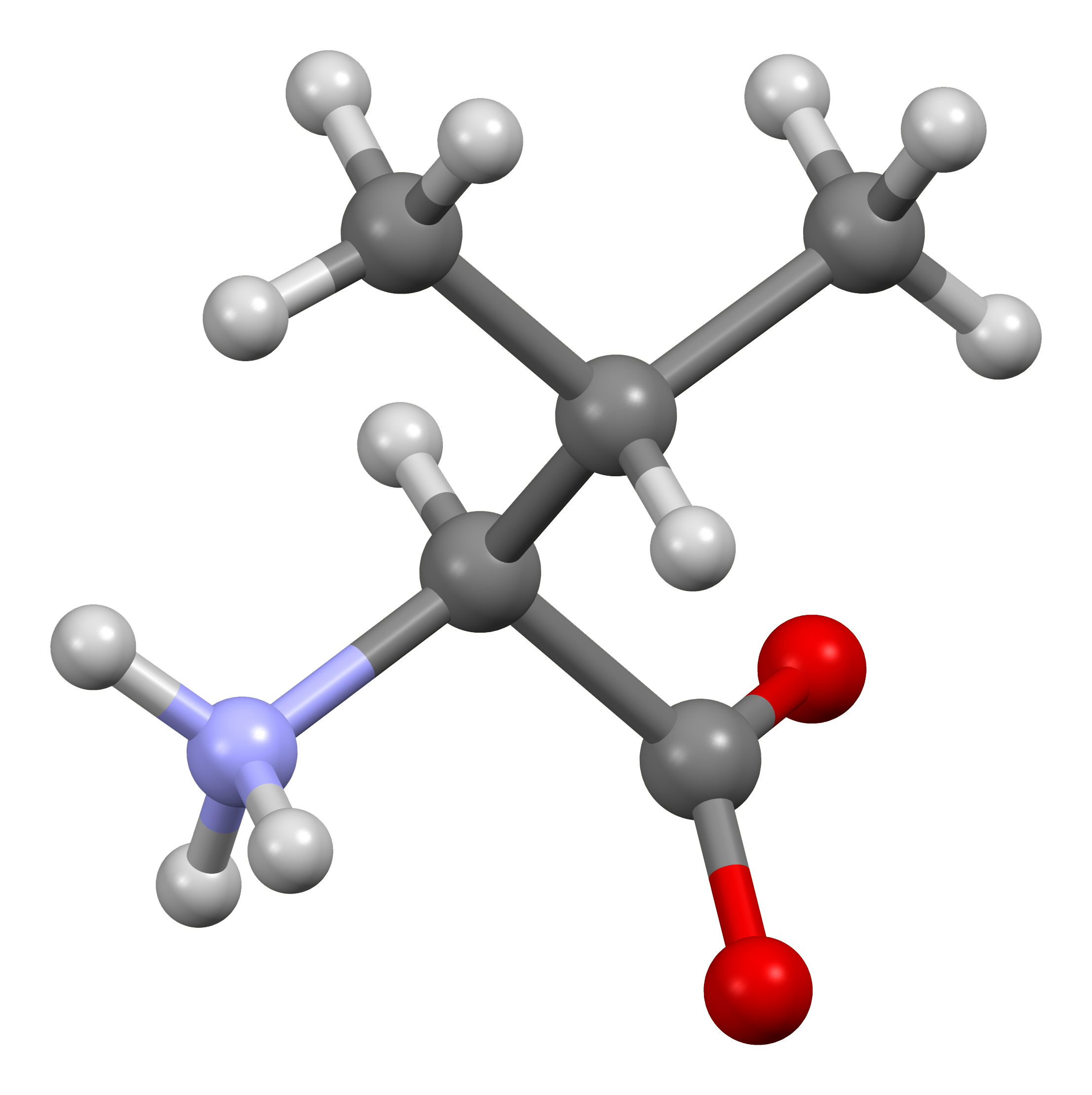
Ball-and-stick model
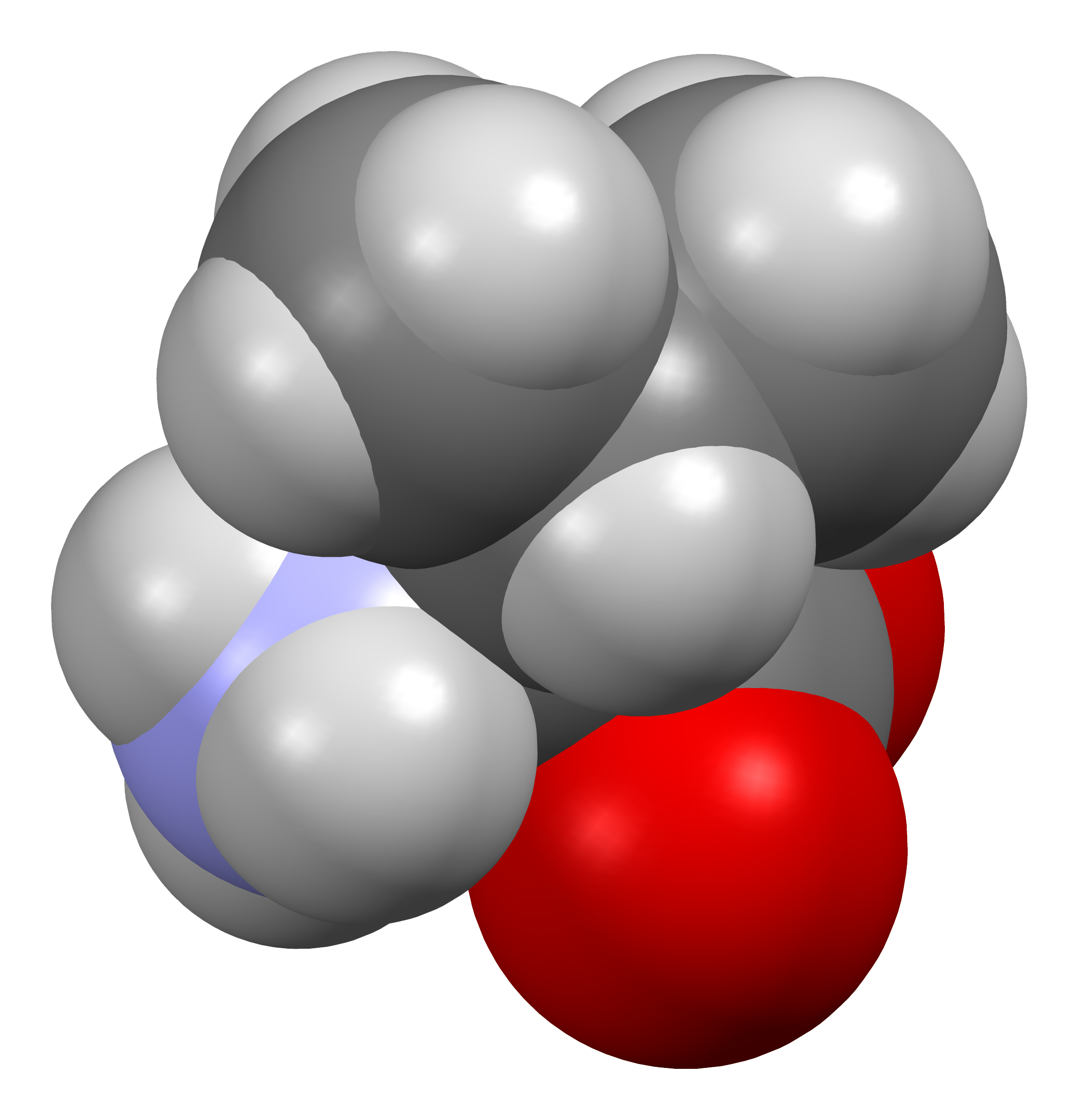
Space-filling model

Names
- IUPAC name Valine
- Systematic IUPAC name 2-Amino-3-methylbutanoic acid
- Other names 2-Aminoisovaleric acid Valic acid

Identifiers
CAS Number	L: 72-18-4; D/L: 516-06-3; D: 640-68-6
3D model (JSmol)	L: Interactive image; L Zwitterion: Interactive image
ChEBI	L: CHEBI:16414
ChEMBL	L: ChEMBL43068
ChemSpider	L: 6050; D/L: 1148; D: 64635
DrugBank	L: DB00161
ECHA InfoCard	100.000.703
EC Number	L: 200-773-6
IUPHAR/BPS	L: 4794
KEGG	L: D00039
PubChem CID	L: 6287; D/L: 1182; D: 71563
UNII	L: HG18B9YRS7; D/L: 4CA13A832H; D: Y14I1443UR
CompTox Dashboard (EPA)	L: DTXSID40883233
- InChI: InChI=1S/C5H11NO2/c1-3(2)4(6)5(7)8/h3-4H,6H2,1-2H3,(H,7,8)/t4-/m0/s1 Key: KZSNJWFQEVHDMF-BYPYZUCNSA-N; D/L: Key: KZSNJWFQEVHDMF-UHFFFAOYSA-N; D: Key: KZSNJWFQEVHDMF-SCSAIBSYSA-N
- SMILES: L: CC(C)[C@@H](C(=O)O)N; L Zwitterion: CC(C)[C@@H](C(=O)[O-])[NH3+]

Properties
Chemical formula	C_{5}H_{11}NO_{2}
Molar mass	117.148 g·mol^{−1}
Density	1.316 g/cm^{3}
Melting point	298 °C (568 °F; 571 K) (decomposition)
Solubility in water	soluble, 85 g/L
Acidity (pK_{a})	2.32 (carboxyl), 9.62 (amino)
Magnetic susceptibility (χ)	−74.3·10^{−6} cm^{3}/mol

Supplementary data page
- Valine (data page)
- Except where otherwise noted, data are given for materials in their standard state (at 25 °C [77 °F], 100 kPa). Infobox references

Valine ball and stick model spinning

Valine (symbol Val or V) is an α-amino acid that is used in the biosynthesis of proteins. It contains an α-amino group (which is in the protonated −NH_{3}^{+} form under biological conditions), an α-carboxylic acid group (which is in the deprotonated −COO^{−} form under biological conditions), and a side chain isopropyl group, making it a non-polar aliphatic amino acid. Valine is essential in humans, meaning the body cannot synthesize it; it must be obtained from dietary sources which are foods that contain proteins, such as meats, dairy products, soy products, beans and legumes. It is encoded by all codons starting with GU (GUU, GUC, GUA, and GUG).

== History and etymology ==
Valine was first isolated from casein in 1901 by Hermann Emil Fischer. The name valine comes from its structural similarity to valeric acid, which in turn is named after the plant valerian due to the presence of the acid in the roots of the plant.

== Nomenclature ==
According to IUPAC, carbon atoms forming valine are numbered sequentially starting from 1 denoting the carboxyl carbon, whereas 4 and 4' denote the two terminal methyl carbons.

== Metabolism ==
=== Source and biosynthesis ===
Valine, like other branched-chain amino acids, is synthesized by bacteria and plants, but not by animals. It is therefore an essential amino acid in animals, and needs to be present in the diet. Adult humans require about 24 mg/kg body weight daily. It is synthesized in plants and bacteria via several steps starting from pyruvic acid. The initial part of the pathway also leads to leucine. The intermediate α-ketoisovalerate undergoes reductive amination with glutamate. Enzymes involved in this biosynthesis include:

1. Acetolactate synthase (also known as acetohydroxy acid synthase)
2. Acetohydroxy acid isomeroreductase
3. Dihydroxyacid dehydratase
4. Valine aminotransferase

=== Degradation ===
Like other branched-chain amino acids, the catabolism of valine starts with the removal of the amino group by transamination, giving alpha-ketoisovalerate, an alpha-keto acid, which is converted to isobutyryl-CoA through oxidative decarboxylation by the branched-chain α-ketoacid dehydrogenase complex. This is further oxidised and rearranged to succinyl-CoA, which can enter the citric acid cycle and provide direct fuel in muscle tissue.

== Synthesis ==
Racemic valine can be synthesized by bromination of isovaleric acid followed by amination of the α-bromo derivative.

HO_{2}CCH_{2}CH(CH_{3})_{2} + Br_{2} → HO_{2}CCHBrCH(CH_{3})_{2} + HBr
HO_{2}CCHBrCH(CH_{3})_{2} + 2 NH_{3} → HO_{2}CCH(NH_{2})CH(CH_{3})_{2} + NH_{4}Br

== Medical significance ==
=== Metabolic diseases ===
The degradation of valine is impaired in the following metabolic diseases:

- Combined malonic and methylmalonic aciduria (CMAMMA)
- Maple syrup urine disease (MSUD)
- Methylmalonic acidemia
- Propionic acidemia

=== Insulin resistance ===
Lower levels of serum valine, like other branched-chain amino acids, are associated with weight loss and decreased insulin resistance: higher levels of valine are observed in the blood of diabetic mice, rats, and humans. Mice fed a BCAA-deprived diet for one day had improved insulin sensitivity, and feeding of a valine-deprived diet for one week significantly decreases blood glucose levels. In diet-induced obese and insulin resistant mice, a diet with decreased levels of valine and the other branched-chain amino acids resulted in a rapid reversal of the adiposity and an improvement in glucose-level control. The valine catabolite 3-hydroxyisobutyrate promotes insulin resistance in mice by stimulating fatty acid uptake into muscle and lipid accumulation. In mice, a BCAA-restricted diet decreased fasting blood glucose levels and improved body composition.

=== Hematopoietic stem cells ===
Dietary valine is essential for hematopoietic stem cell (HSC) self-renewal, as demonstrated by experiments in mice. Dietary valine restriction selectively depletes long-term repopulating HSC in mouse bone marrow. Successful stem cell transplantation was achieved in mice without irradiation after 3 weeks on a valine restricted diet. Long-term survival of the transplanted mice was achieved when valine was returned to the diet gradually over a 2-week period to avoid refeeding syndrome.

== See also ==
- Valinol
