= Mitomycin C =

Chemical compound

- Skeletal formula

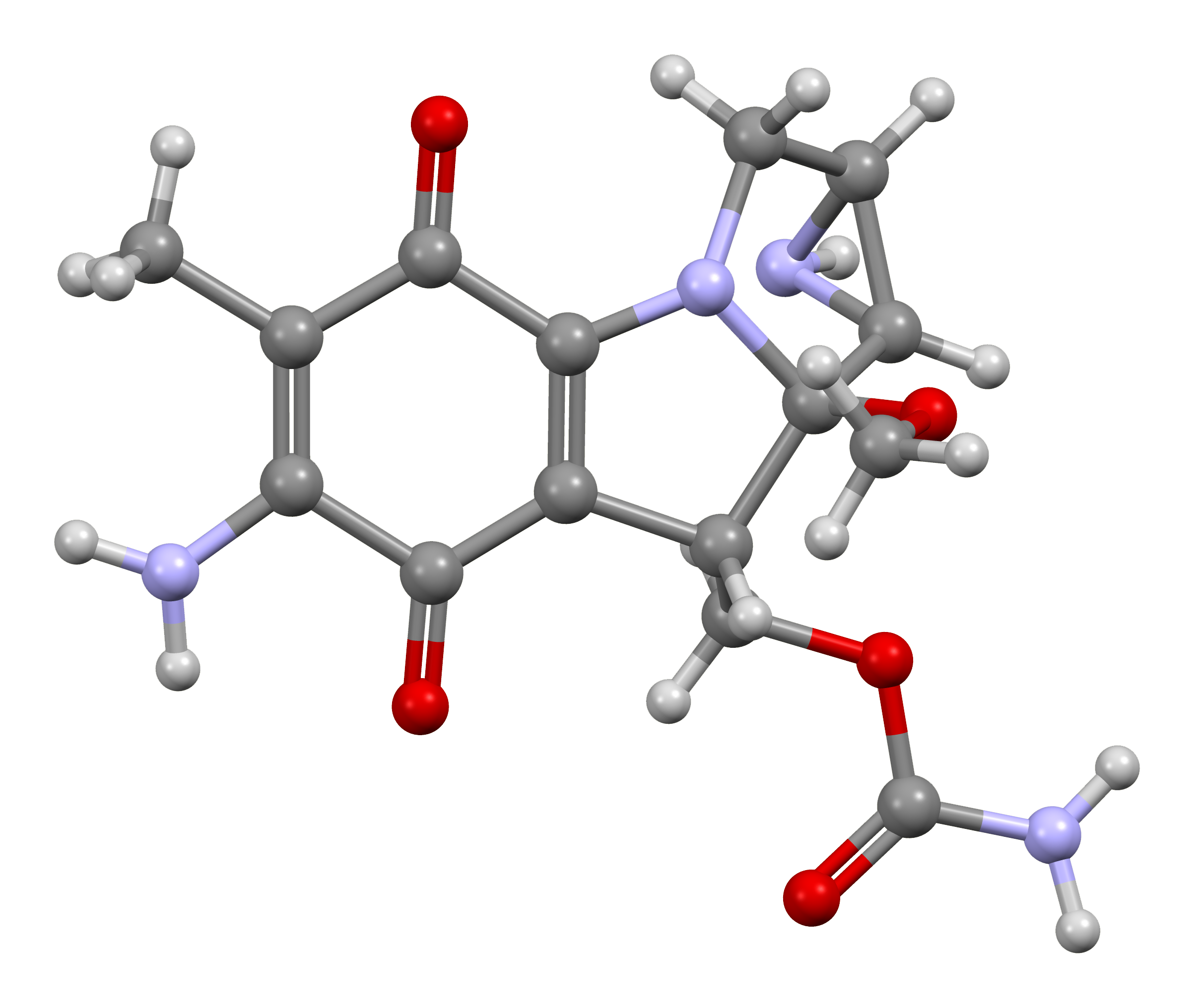
- Ball-and-stick model of the molecular structure determined by X-ray crystallography

Clinical data
- Trade names: Mitosol, Mutamycin, Jelmyto
- Other names: UGN-101, UGN-102
- AHFS/Drugs.com: Monograph
- MedlinePlus: a682415
- License data: US DailyMed: Mitomycin
- Pregnancy category: AU: D
- Routes of administration: Intravenous, topical, intravesical
- Drug class: Antineoplastic agent
- ATC code: L01DC03 (WHO)

Legal status
- Legal status: AU: S4 (Prescription only); UK: POM (Prescription only); US: ℞-only

Pharmacokinetic data
- Metabolism: Liver
- Elimination half-life: 8–48 min

Identifiers
- IUPAC name: {11-Amino-7-methoxy-12-methyl-10,13-dioxo-2,5-diazatetracyclo[7.4.0.0^{2,7}.0^{4,6}]trideca-1(9),11-dien-8-yl}methyl carbamate
- CAS Number: 50-07-7
- PubChem CID: 5746
- PubChem SID: 44286993
- IUPHAR/BPS: 7089
- DrugBank: DB00305
- ChemSpider: 5544
- UNII: 50SG953SK6
- KEGG: C06681
- ChEBI: CHEBI:27504
- ChEMBL: ChEMBL105
- CompTox Dashboard (EPA): DTXSID2020898
- ECHA InfoCard: 100.000.008

Chemical and physical data
- Formula: C_{15}H_{18}N_{4}O_{5}
- Molar mass: 334.332 g·mol^{−1}
- 3D model (JSmol): Interactive image
- Melting point: 360 °C (680 °F)
- Solubility in water: 8.43 g L^{−1}
- SMILES: CO[C@@]12[C@H](COC(N)=O)C3=C(C(=O)C(C)=C(N)C3=O)N1C[C@@H]1N[C@@H]12
- InChI: InChI=1S/C15H18N4O5/c1-5-9(16)12(21)8-6(4-24-14(17)22)15(23-2)13-7(18-13)3-19(15)10(8)11(5)20/h6-7,13,18H,3-4,16H2,1-2H3,(H2,17,22)/t6-,7+,13+,15-/m1/s1; Key:NWIBSHFKIJFRCO-WUDYKRTCSA-N

Mitomycin C is a mitomycin that is used as a chemotherapeutic agent by virtue of its antitumour activity.

== Medical uses ==
It is given intravenously to treat upper gastro-intestinal cancers (e.g. esophageal carcinoma), anal cancers, and breast cancers, as well as by bladder instillation for superficial bladder tumours. It is given via intravesical administration for non-muscle invasive bladder cancer.

Mitomycin C is also used topically rather than intravenously for eye surgery. Mitomycin C is applied topically to prevent scarring during glaucoma filtering surgery and to prevent haze after photorefractive keratectomy (PRK) or LASIK; mitomycin C has also been shown to reduce fibrosis in strabismus surgery.

In April 2020, mitomycin gel, sold under the brand name Jelmyto, was approved in the United States for the treatment of low-grade upper tract urothelial cancer. Urothelial cancer is a cancer of the lining of the urinary system.

In June 2025, mitomycin intravesical solution, sold under the brand name Zusduri, was approved in the United States for the treatment of adults with recurrent low-grade intermediate-risk non-muscle invasive bladder cancer.

== Contraindications ==
Pregnant women should not take mitomycin gel because it may cause harm to a developing fetus or newborn baby.

== Side effects ==
It causes delayed bone marrow toxicity and therefore it is usually administered at 6-weekly intervals. Prolonged use may result in permanent bone-marrow damage. It may also cause lung fibrosis and renal damage.

Anticancer treatments with chemotherapeutic agents often impair brain cell function leading to memory loss and cognitive dysfunction. In order to understand the basis of these impairments, mice were treated with mitomycin C, a chemotherapeutic agent, and cells of the prefrontal cortex were examined. This treatment resulted in an increase of the oxidative DNA damage 8-oxo-dG, a decrease in the enzyme OGG1 that ordinarily repairs such damage and epigenetic alterations. These alterations at the DNA level may explain, at least in part, the impairments of cognitive function after chemotherapy.

Common side effects are ureteric obstruction (narrowing or blockage of the ureter that may lead to excess fluid in the kidney due to a backup of urine), flank pain (pain occurring on the side of the body), urinary tract infection, hematuria (blood in the urine), renal dysfunction (inability of the kidney to function in its designed capacity), fatigue, nausea, abdominal pain, dysuria (painful or difficult urination) and vomiting.

== Pharmacology ==
Mitomycin C is a potent DNA crosslinker. A single crosslink per genome has shown to be effective in killing bacteria. This is accomplished by reductive activation of mitomycin to form a mitosene, which reacts successively via N-alkylation of two DNA bases. Both alkylations are sequence specific for a guanine nucleoside in the sequence 5'-CpG-3'.

Mitomycin gel is an alkylating drug, meaning it inhibits the transcription of DNA into RNA, stopping protein synthesis and taking away the cancer cell's ability to multiply.

== History ==
Mitomycin was discovered in 1955 by Japanese scientists in cultures of the microorganism Streptomyces caespitosus. Mitomycin C was isolated as purple crystals by Wakaki and his coworkers from Kyowa Hakko Kogyo in 1956.

It was approved based on the results of the OLYMPUS (NCT02793128) multicenter trial involving 71 subjects with low-grade upper urinary tract urothelial cancer (UTUC). These subjects had never undergone treatment (treatment-naïve) or had recurrent low-grade non-invasive UTUC with at least one measurable papillary tumor (a tumor shaped like a small mushroom with its stem attached to the inner lining of an organ) located above the ureteropelvic junction. Subjects received mitomycin gel once a week (mitomycin gel 4 mg per mL instillations via ureteral catheter or nephrostomy tube) for six weeks and, if assessed as a complete response (complete disappearance of the papillary tumor), monthly for up to eleven additional months. Efficacy of mitomycin gel was evaluated using urine cytology (a test to look for abnormal cells in a subjects's urine), ureteroscopy (an examination of the upper urinary tract) and biopsy (if warranted) three months following the initiation of therapy.

The primary endpoint was complete response at three months following initiation of therapy. A complete response was found in 41 of the 71 subjects (58%) following six treatments of mitomycin gel administered weekly. Durability of the effect of mitomycin gel in subjects with a complete response was also evaluated using urine cytology, ureteroscopy and biopsy (if warranted) every three months for a year following the initiation of therapy. Nineteen subjects (46%) who achieved a complete response continued to have a complete response at the twelve-month mark.

The US Food and Drug Administration (FDA) granted the application for mitomycin gel priority review along with breakthrough therapy, fast track, and orphan drug designations. The FDA granted approval of Jelmyto to UroGen Pharma, Inc.

The efficacy of mitomycin C for the treatment of recurrent low-grade intermediate-risk non-muscle invasive bladder cancer was evaluated in ENVISION (NCT05243550), a single-arm, multi-center trial in 240 adults with low-grade non-muscle invasive bladder cancer that recurred after prior transurethral resection of bladder tumor and met 1-2 of the following criteria: multiple tumors, a solitary tumor >3 cm, and/or recurrence within one year. Participants received 75 mg mitomycin intravesical solution instilled once a week for six consecutive weeks. Assessment of tumor status was performed every three months by cystoscopy, for-cause biopsy, and urine cytology.

== Research ==
Potential bis-alkylating heterocyclic quinones were synthesised in order to explore their antitumoral activities by bioreductive alkylation.

In the bacterium Legionella pneumophila, mitomycin C induces competence, a condition necessary for the process of natural transformation that transfers DNA and promotes recombination between cells. Exposure of the fruitfly Drosophila melanogaster to mitomycin C increases recombination during meiosis, a key stage of the sexual cycle. It has been suggested that during sexual process in prokaryotes (transformation) and eukaryotes (meiosis) DNA cross-links and other damages introduced by mitomycin C may be removed by recombinational repair.
