= Hydroxycarboxylic acid =

Organic compounds containing hydroxy and carboxylic groups

Hydroxycarboxylic acids are carboxylic acids containing one or more hydroxy (alcohol) functional groups. They are of particular interest because several are bioactive and some are useful precursors to polyesters. The inventory is large.

== Important or common examples ==
- Glycolic acid, HOCH_{2}CO_{2}H, the parent hydroxycarboxylic acid, precursor to lacquers
- Hydroxypropionic acids, e.g., CH_{3}CH(OH)CO_{2}H (lactic acid), component of milk. chiral
- Hydroxybutyric acids, CH_{3}CH(OH)CH_{2}CO_{2}H (beta-Hydroxybutyric acid), carbon-storage compound
- Citric acid, HO_{2}CC(OH)(CH_{2}CO_{2}H)_{2}, energy-carrying compound and iron-chelator
- Salicylic acid, 2−HOC_{6}H_{4}CO_{2}H, precursor to aspirin
- Ricinoleic acid (12-hydroxy-9-cis-octadecenoic acid)), a major component of the seed oil obtained from castor plant
- Common amino acids:
  - Serine (2-amino-3-hydroxypropanoic acid), HOCH_{2}CH(NH_{2})CO_{2}H
  - Threonine
  - Tyrosine, 4−HOC_{6}H_{4}CH_{2}CH(NH_{2})CO_{2}H
- Aldonic acids are sugar acids with the general chemical formula, HO_{2}C(CHOH)_{n}CH_{2}OH.
  - Gluconic acid, a particularly common aldonic acid, the oxidized derivative of glucose

== Subclasses ==
Classes of hydroxycarboxylic acid are named by where the hydroxy group is on the carbon chain relative to the carboxylic group.

- Alpha hydroxy acid
- Beta hydroxy acid
- Omega hydroxy acid

== See also ==
- Hydroxycarboxylic acid receptor
