= Hydroxyacid =

Hydroxyacid may refer to:

- an α‑hydroxycarboxylic acid
- a β‑hydroxycarboxylic acid
- a γ-hydroxy acid
- an ω-hydroxy acid
