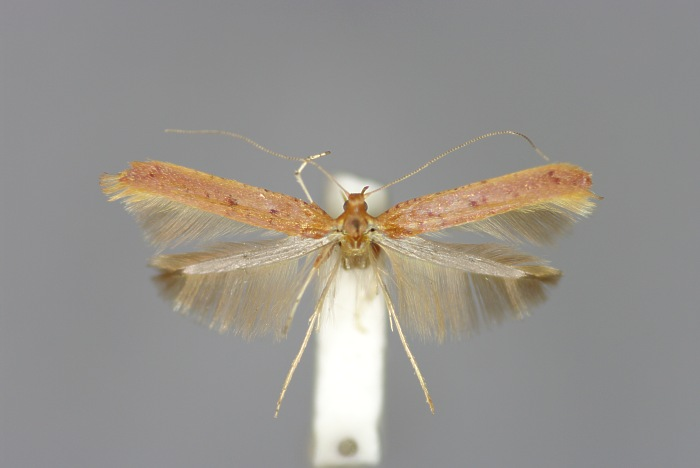

Scientific classification
- Kingdom: Animalia
- Phylum: Arthropoda
- Clade: Pancrustacea
- Class: Insecta
- Order: Lepidoptera
- Family: Gracillariidae
- Genus: Caloptilia
- Species: C. elongella

Binomial name
- Caloptilia elongella (Linnaeus, 1761)

Synonyms
- List: Phalaena elongella Linnaeus, 1761; Caloptilia bruneorubella (Bruand, 1851); Caloptilia brunneorubella (Bruand, 1858); Caloptilia elongatus (Fabricius, 1798); Caloptilia inconstans (Stainton, 1851); Caloptilia inconstantella (Bruand, 1858); Caloptilia numerosipunctella (Bruand, 1858); Caloptilia ochrea Dufrane, 1944; Caloptilia olongella (Riley, 1891); Caloptilia punctella (Linnaeus, 1761); Caloptilia signipennella (Hübner, 1796); Caloptilia signipennis (Haworth, 1828); Caloptilia stramineella (Stainton, 1851); Caloptilia strigulella (Predota, 1917); Caloptilia uniformata Dufrane, 1944

= Caloptilia elongella =

Pale red slender

Species of moth

Caloptilia elongella (commonly known as the pale red slender) is a moth of the family Gracillariidae, first described by the Swedish biologist and physician Carl Linnaeus, from a specimen moth found in Småland, Sweden in 1761. It is known from Asia, Europe and North America.

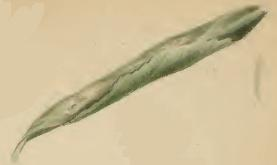
A longitudinally rolled alder leaf

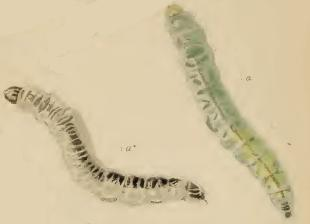
Larvae

== Description ==
The wingspan is 14–16 millimetres (0.55–0.63 in). The forewings are deep reddish-ochreous, sometimes mixed or suffused with pale yellowish; margins sometimes with darker dots; often an indistinct pale yellowish triangular costal blotch before middle. Hindwings are rather dark grey. The larva is whitish or pale greenish; dorsal line dark grey; head pale brownish or greenish. It is very similar to the red birch slender (Caloptilia betulicola) and both species are quite variable. Identification requires microscopic examination of the genitalia.

There are two generations per year, with adults on wing in June and again during September, after which they hibernate and reappear in spring.

Ovum

Eggs are laid on the upper side of a leaf of alder, usually over a vein.

Larva

Larvae are found from May to July and feed at first in a mine. It later feeds in a rolled or folded leaf on common alder (Alnus glutinosa), grey alder (Alnus incana), Italian alder (Alnus cordata) and Alnus minor. Larvae initially feed in an irregular gallery in the upper epidermis and has a central line of pale-brown frass which is attached to the cuticle. The larva then forms a silvery epidermal upper-surface blotch with light brown frass over a vein, where it feeds on the sap. When it later begins to feed on the tissue, the leaf rolls into a tube, the frass is black and packed in one end. On leaving the tube, the larva first folds a leaf downwards and is fastened with silk.

Pupa

Pupation in a transparent, yellow-shining cocoon, generally at the leaf margin.

== Distribution ==
It is known from all of Europe east to eastern Russia. It is also found in North America from British Columbia, south to California and east in the north to New Hampshire and New York.

== Etymology ==
Caloptilia was raised by the German entomologist, Jacob Hübner in 1825 and the name is from Greek and means (kalos), beautiful and (ptilon) a feather, referring to the wing and the attractive appearance of the moth. The specific name elongella from the Latin elongus, very long, from the relatively long forewing; not from the long roll of the larva, since the life cycle of the moth was unknown in 1861.
