= Preservation of biopolymers =

Paleontological phenomena

Most fossils represent mineralized material such as bone or shells. However, biopolymers such as chitin and collagen can sometimes leave fossils – most famously in Burgess Shale type preservation and palynomorphs. The preservation of soft tissue is not as rare as sometimes thought.

== What is preserved ==
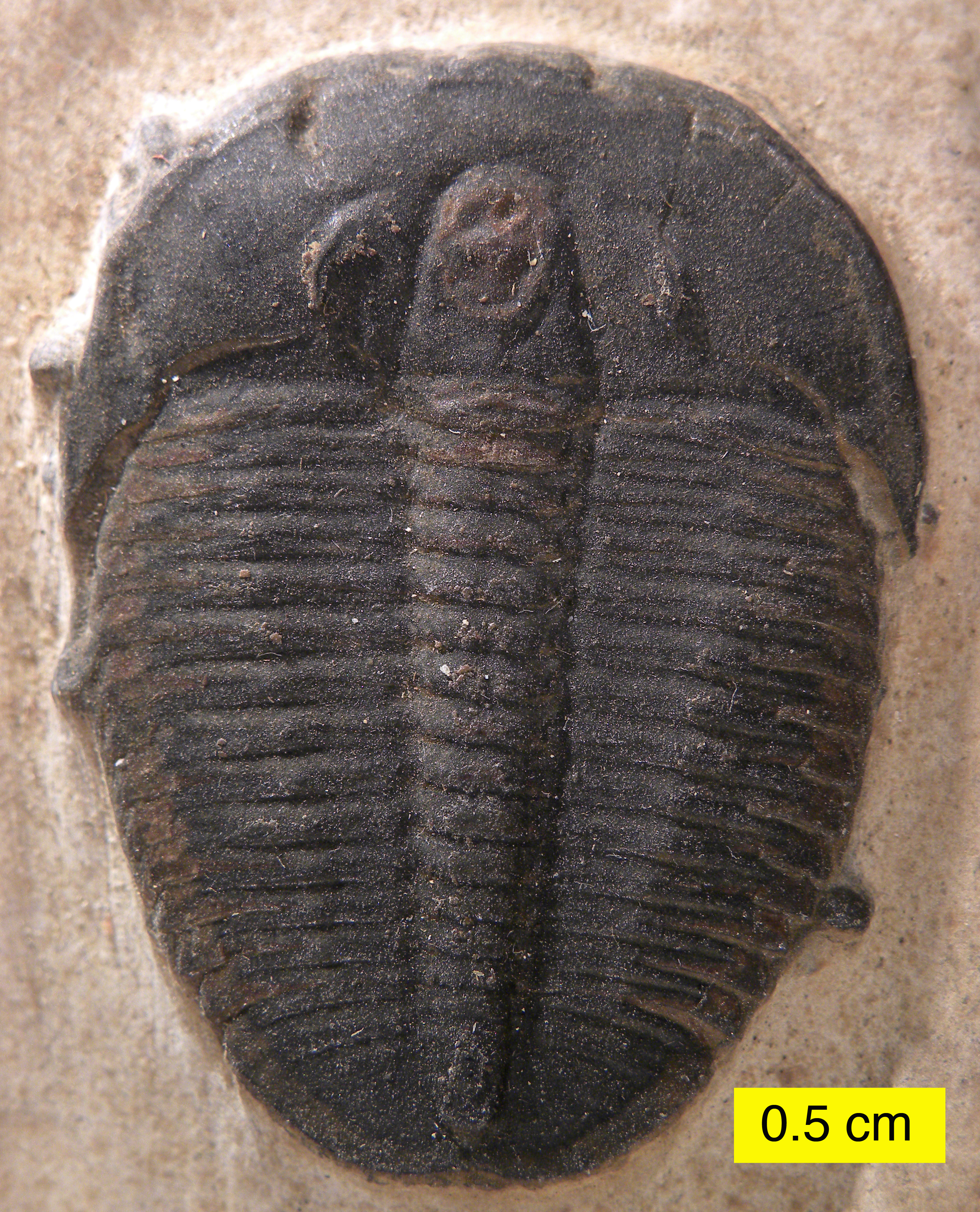
Although chitin exoskeletons of arthropods are subject to decomposition, they often maintain shape during permineralization, especially if they are already somewhat mineralized.

Both DNA and proteins are unstable, and rarely survive more than hundreds of thousands of years before degrading. Polysaccharides also have low preservation potential, unless they are highly cross-linked; this interconnection is most common in structural tissues, and renders them resistant to chemical decay. Such tissues include wood (lignin), spores and pollen (sporopollenin), the cuticles of plants (cutan) and animals, the cell walls of algae (algaenan), and potentially the polysaccharide layer of some lichens. This interconnectedness makes the chemicals less prone to chemical decay, and also means they are a poorer source of energy so less likely to be digested by scavenging organisms. After being subjected to heat and pressure, these cross-linked organic molecules typically 'cook' and become kerogen or short (<17 C atoms) aliphatic/aromatic carbon molecules. Other factors affect the likelihood of preservation; for instance sclerotization renders the jaws of polychaetes more readily preserved than the chemically equivalent but non-sclerotized body cuticle.

It was thought that only tough, cuticle type soft tissue could be preserved by Burgess Shale type preservation, but an increasing number of organisms are being discovered that lack such cuticle, such as the probable chordate Pikaia and the shellless Odontogriphus.

It is a common misconception that anaerobic conditions are necessary for the preservation of soft tissue; indeed much decay is mediated by sulfate-reducing bacteria which can only survive in anaerobic conditions. Anoxia does, however, reduce the probability that scavengers will disturb the dead organism, and the activity of other organisms is undoubtedly one of the leading causes of soft-tissue destruction.

Plant cuticle is more prone to preservation if it contains cutan, rather than cutin.

Plants and algae produce the most preservable compounds, which are listed according to their preservation potential by Tegellaar (see reference).

== Role of clay minerals ==
Clay minerals can enhance the preservation of organic matter, and different clay minerals leave distinct signatures. Organic matter accompanied by clays tends to be rich in lipids and deficient in protein and lignin; kaolinite seems to enrich organic matter with polysaccharides, whereas organic matter rich in aromatic compounds preserve in association with smectites such as montmorillonite.
