= Cuticle =

Various biological tissues or structures

A cuticle (/ˈkjuːtɪkəl/), or cuticula, is any of a variety of tough but flexible, non-mineral outer coverings of an organism, or parts of an organism, that provide protection. Various types of "cuticle" are non-homologous, differing in their origin, structure, function, and chemical composition.

== Human anatomy ==
Anatomy of the basic parts of a human nail

In human anatomy, "cuticle" can refer to several structures, but it is used in general parlance, and even by medical professionals, to refer to the thickened layer of skin surrounding fingernails and toenails (the eponychium), and to refer to the superficial layer of overlapping cells covering the hair shaft (cuticula pili), consisting of dead cells, that locks the hair into its follicle. It can also be used as a synonym for the epidermis, the outer layer of skin.

== Cuticle of invertebrates ==
In zoology, the invertebrate cuticle or cuticula is a multi-layered structure outside the epidermis of many invertebrates, notably arthropods and roundworms, in which it forms an exoskeleton (see arthropod exoskeleton).

The main structural components of the nematode cuticle are proteins, highly cross-linked collagens and specialised insoluble proteins known as "cuticlins", together with glycoproteins and lipids.

The main structural component of arthropod cuticle is chitin, a polysaccharide composed of N-acetylglucosamine units, together with proteins and lipids. The proteins and chitin are cross-linked. The rigidity is a function of the types of proteins and the quantity of chitin. It is believed that the epidermal cells produce protein and also monitor the timing and amount of protein to be incorporated into the cuticle.

Often, in the cuticle of arthropods, structural coloration is observed, produced by nanostructures. In the mealworm beetle, Tenebrio molitor, cuticular color may suggest pathogen resistance in that darker individuals are more resistant to pathogens compared to more tan individuals.

== Botany ==
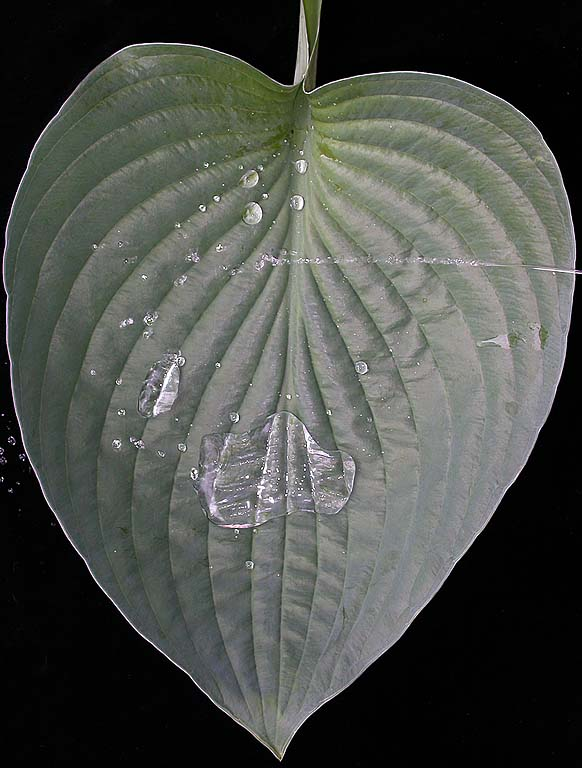
Epicuticular wax covering the cuticle of a leaf of Hosta sieboldiana makes it hydrophobic. Water, unable to wet the cuticle, beads up and runs off, carrying dust and soluble contamination with it. This self-cleaning property is variously called "ultrahydrophobicity" or "ultralyophobicity" in technical journals. More popularly it is known as the Lotus effect.

In botany, plant cuticles are protective, hydrophobic, waxy coverings produced by the epidermal cells of leaves, young shoots and all other aerial plant organs. Cuticles minimize water loss and effectively reduce pathogen entry due to their waxy secretion. The main structural components of plant cuticles are the unique polymers cutin or cutan, impregnated with wax. Plant cuticles function as permeability barriers for water and water-soluble materials. They prevent plant surfaces from becoming wet and also help to prevent plants from drying out. Xerophytic plants such as cacti have very thick cuticles to help them survive in their arid climates. Plants that live in range of sea's spray also may have thicker cuticles that protect them from the toxic effects of salt.

Some plants, particularly those adapted to life in damp or aquatic environments, have an extreme resistance to wetting. A well-known example is the sacred lotus. This adaptation is not purely the physical and chemical effect of a waxy coating but depends largely on the microscopic shape of the surface. When a hydrophobic surface is sculpted into microscopic, regular, elevated areas, sometimes in fractal patterns, too high and too closely spaced for the surface tension of the liquid to permit any flow into the space between the plateaus, then the area of contact between liquid and solid surfaces may be reduced to a small fraction of what a smooth surface might permit. The effect is to reduce wetting of the surface substantially.

Structural coloration is also observed in the cuticles of plants (see, as an example, the so-called "marble berry", Pollia condensata.

== Mycology ==
"Cuticle" is one term used for the outer layer of tissue of a mushroom's basidiocarp, or "fruit body". The alternative term "pileipellis", Latin for "skin" of a "cap" (meaning "mushroom") might be technically preferable, but is perhaps too cumbersome for popular use. It is the part removed in "peeling" mushrooms. On the other hand, some morphological terminology in mycology makes finer distinctions, such as described in the article on the "pileipellis". Be that as it may, the pileipellis (or "peel") is distinct from the trama, the inner fleshy tissue of a mushroom or similar fruiting body, and also from the spore-bearing tissue layer, the hymenium.
