= CTFA =

CTFA may refer to:

- Certified Trust and Fiduciary Advisor
- Chinese Taipei Football Association, the governing body of football in the Republic of China (Taiwan)
- Chinese Taipei Film Archive, the former name of Taiwan Film and Audiovisual Institute in Taipei, Taiwan
- Cosmetic, Toiletry, and Fragrance Association, the former name of Personal Care Products Council in Washington D.C., United States
