= Juniperic acid =

Juniper and conifer trees have many beneficial compound known by science

Names
- IUPAC name 16-Hydroxyhexadecanoic acid
- Other names: 16-Hydroxypalmitic acid; omega-Hydroxypalmitic acid; ω-Hydroxypalmitic acid

Identifiers
CAS Number	506-13-8
3D model (JSmol)	Interactive image
ChEBI	CHEBI:55328
ChEMBL	ChEMBL4281719
ChemSpider	10034
ECHA InfoCard	100.007.299
EC Number	208-028-7
KEGG	C18218
PubChem CID	10466
UNII	7IPP3U0F3I
CompTox Dashboard (EPA)	DTXSID6060133
- InChI: InChI=1S/C16H32O3/c17-15-13-11-9-7-5-3-1-2-4-6-8-10-12-14-16(18)19/h17H,1-15H2,(H,18,19) Key: UGAGPNKCDRTDHP-UHFFFAOYSA-N
- SMILES: C(CCCCCCCC(=O)O)CCCCCCCO

Properties
Chemical formula	C_{16}H_{32}O_{3}
Molar mass	272.429 g·mol^{−1}
- Except where otherwise noted, data are given for materials in their standard state (at 25 °C [77 °F], 100 kPa). Infobox references

Juniperic acid or 16-hydroxyhexadecanoic acid is an omega-hydroxy long-chain fatty acid that is palmitic acid which is substituted at position 16 by a hydroxy group. Palmitic acid is converted to juniperic acid by cytochrome P450 various enzymes, including CYP704B22.

Juniperic acid is a key monomer of cutin in the plant cuticle. It has a role as a plant metabolite.
