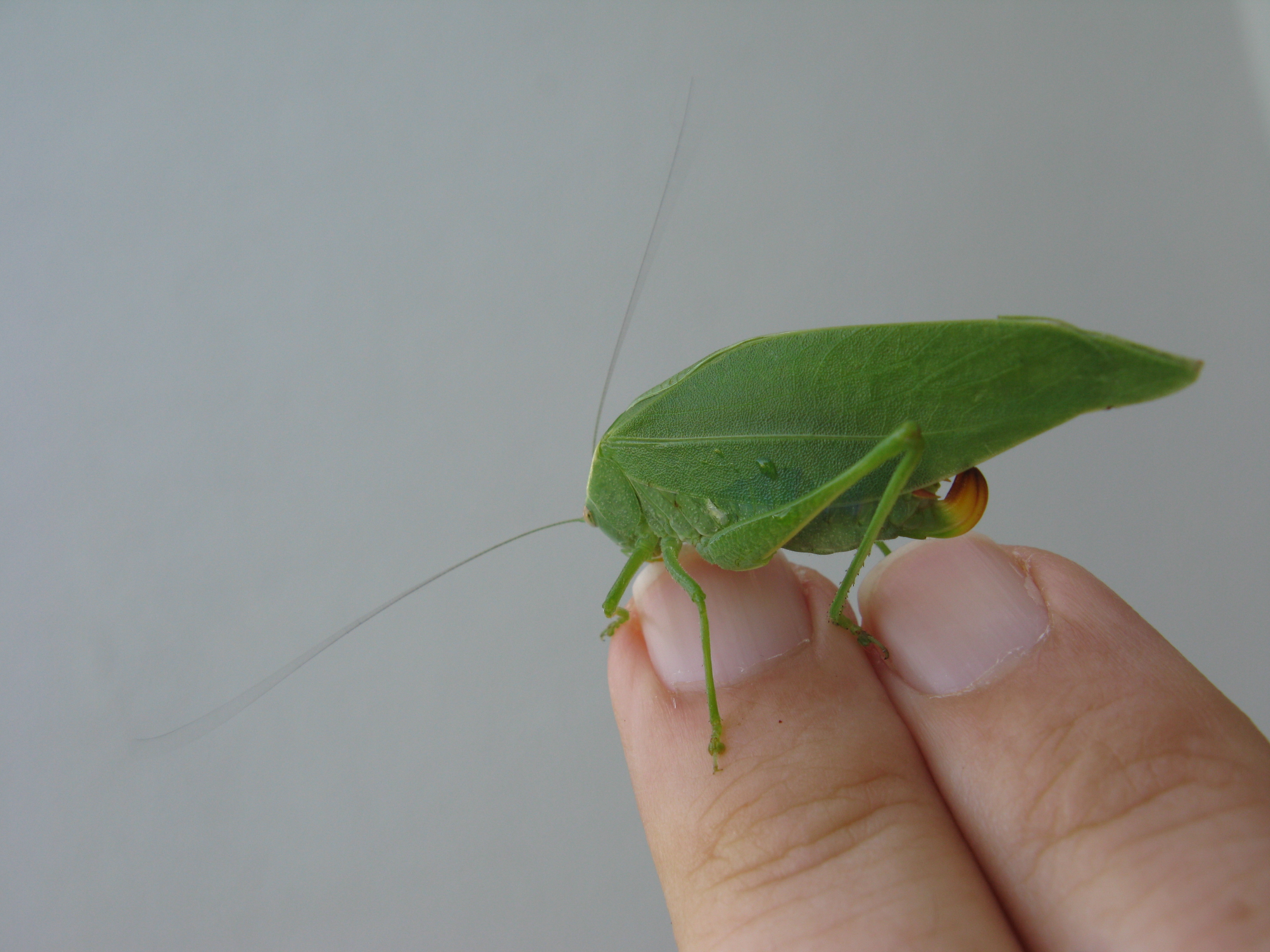
- Female of Plangia graminea. Note the curved, coloured ovipositor

Scientific classification
- Kingdom: Animalia
- Phylum: Arthropoda
- Clade: Pancrustacea
- Class: Insecta
- Order: Orthoptera
- Suborder: Ensifera
- Family: Tettigoniidae
- Subfamily: Phaneropterinae
- Tribe: Amblycoryphini
- Genus: Plangia; Stål, 1873

= Plangia =

Genus of cricket-like animals

Plangia is a genus of insect in family Tettigoniidae. In Afrikaans they are generally known as krompokkels, roughly meaning "little fat hunchbacks"; this name refers to their arched dorsal profile. The genus is indigenous to Sub-Saharan Africa. It includes the following species:

- Plangia albolineata
- Plangia deminuta
- Plangia compressa
- Plangia graminea
- Plangia guttatipennis
- Plangia karschi
- Plangia laminifera
- Plangia nebulosa
- Plangia ovalifolia
- Plangia segonoides
- Plangia unimaculata
- Plangia venata
- Plangia villiersi

== Description ==
Typical Plangia species are moderate-sized katydids, fairly effective green leaf mimics, that lay their rather large, flattened oval eggs under bark, or in individual incisions in the edges of leaves of their food plants. They make the incisions into the leaf parenchyma, between, and parallel to, the dorsal and ventral leaf epidermis. The ovipositor is specialised for the purpose and it has a peculiar shape rather like the curved blade of a field hockey stick. In this respect, the ovipositor differs from most other katydids, that tend to have straight, sometimes very long, ovipositors.

The best-known pest species is Plangia graminea, a lightly built katydid; it is not of much commercial or agricultural importance, rarely worth controlling, but sometimes causes damage to foliage in vineyards and gardens.
