= Fatty-acid peroxidase =

fatty-acid peroxidase

Identifiers
- EC no.: 1.11.1.3
- CAS no.: 9029-52-1

Databases
- IntEnz: IntEnz view
- BRENDA: BRENDA entry
- ExPASy: NiceZyme view
- KEGG: KEGG entry
- MetaCyc: metabolic pathway
- PRIAM: profile
- PDB structures: RCSB PDB PDBe PDBsum
- Gene Ontology: AmiGO / QuickGO
Search
- PMC: articles
- PubMed: articles
- NCBI: proteins

In enzymology, a fatty-acid peroxidase (EC 1.11.1.3) is an enzyme that catalyzes the chemical reaction

palmitate + 2 H_{2}O_{2} $\rightleftharpoons$ pentadecanal + CO_{2} + 3 H_{2}O

Thus, the two substrates of this enzyme are palmitate and H_{2}O_{2}, whereas its 3 products are pentadecanal, CO_{2}, and H_{2}O.

This enzyme belongs to the family of oxidoreductases, specifically those acting on a peroxide as acceptor (peroxidases). The systematic name of this enzyme class is hexadecanoate:hydrogen-peroxide oxidoreductase. This enzyme is also called long chain fatty acid peroxidase.
