= Nail salon =

Beauty salon specialising in nail care

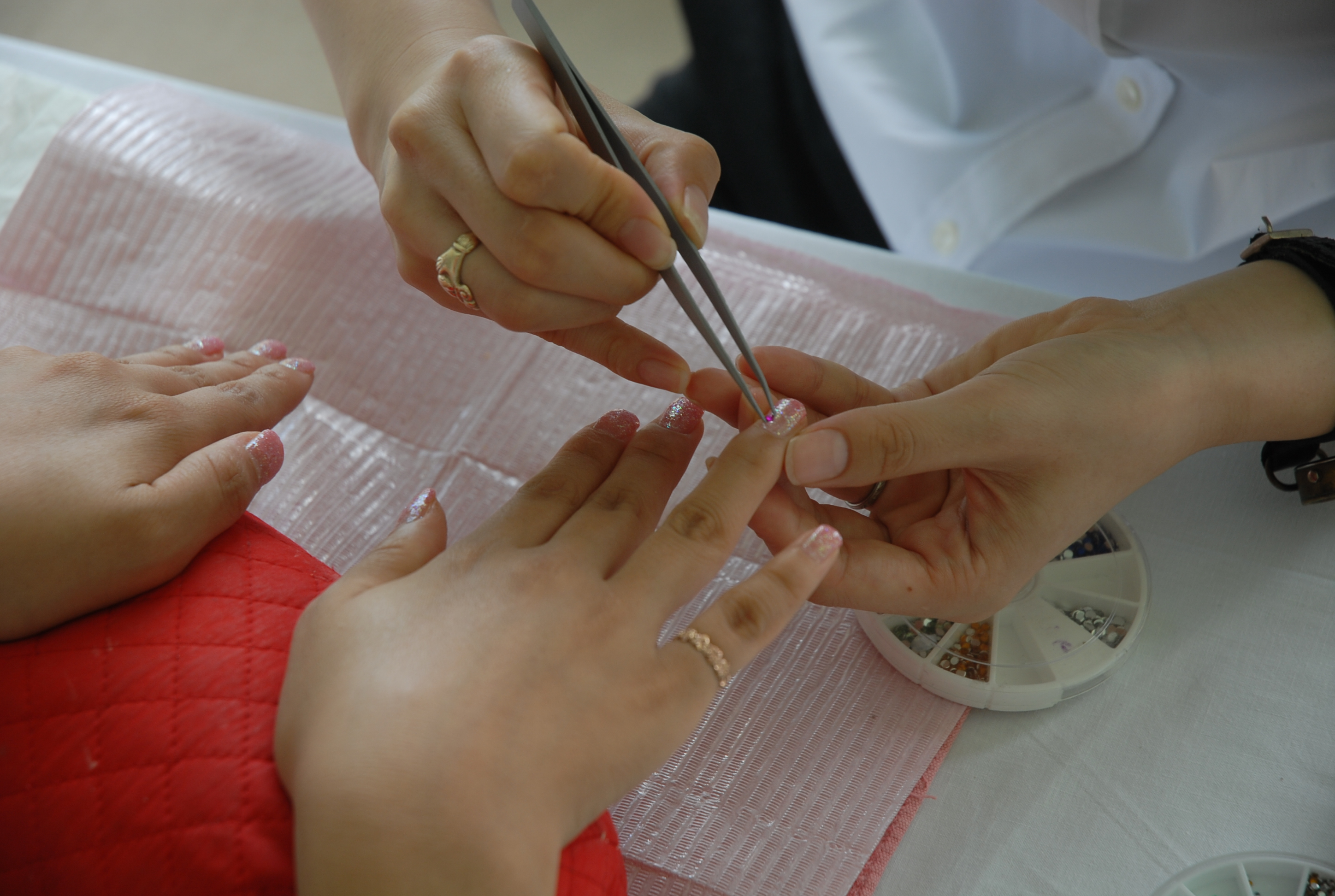
A nail salon manicure.

A nail salon or nail bar is a specialty beauty salon establishment that primarily offers nail care services such as manicures, pedicures, and nail enhancements. Often, nail salons also offer skin care services. Manicures are also offered by general beauty salons, spas, and hotels. People who work at nail salons are usually called nail technicians, manicurists, or nailists.

Nail salons offer a variety of options for nail care, examples of which include acrylics, silk or fiberglass wraps, French manicures, polish, and pedicures. Some nail salons offer one-stop beauty services. In addition to nail services, one-stop nail salons offer facial treatments, waxing, and skin care.

Generally, those working in nail salons are referred to as nail technicians. In some areas throughout the United States, nail technicians must hold formal, state-recognized qualifications in order to be able to work at nail salons. Certifications must come from state board.

== Nail care services ==
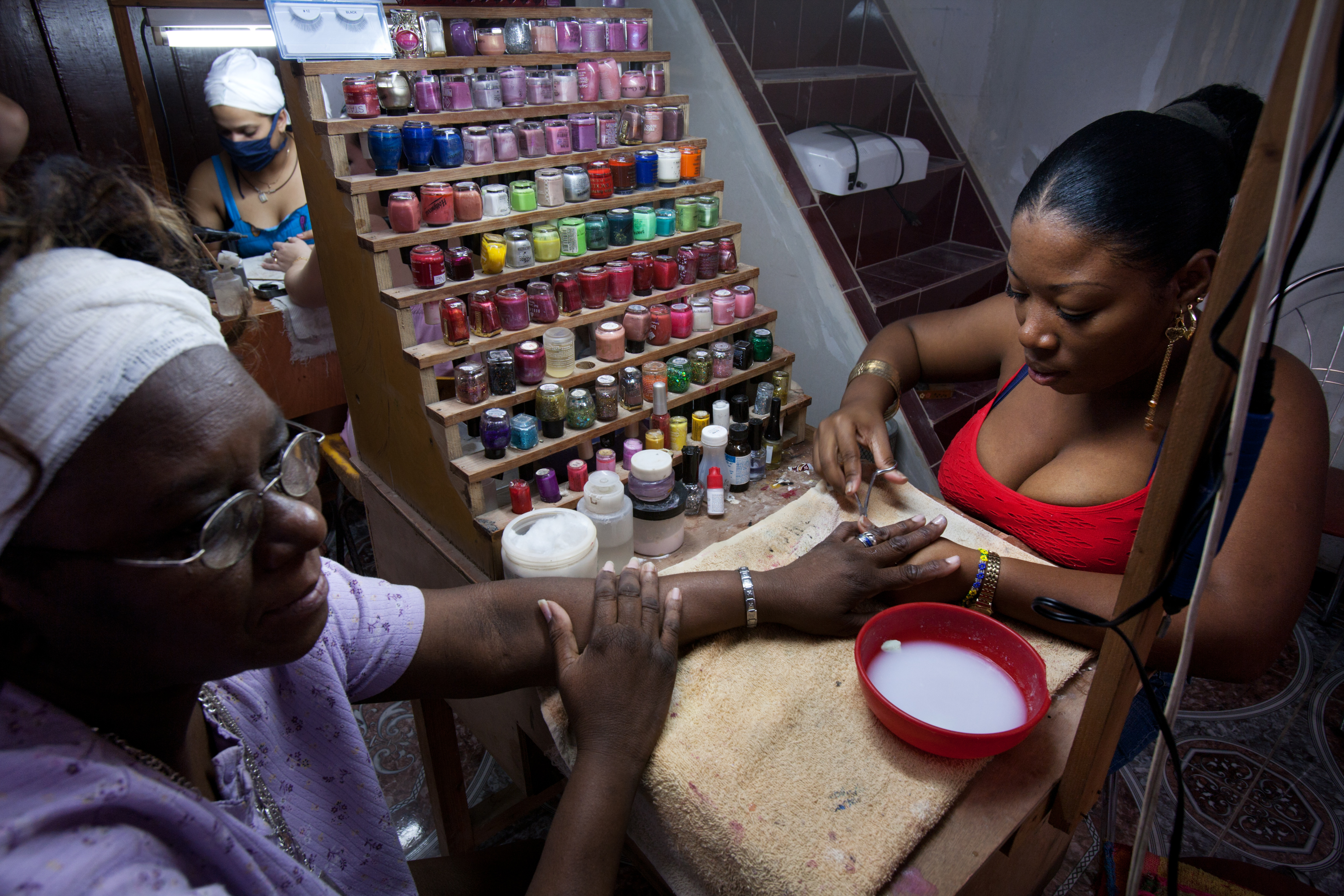
A Havana nail salon.

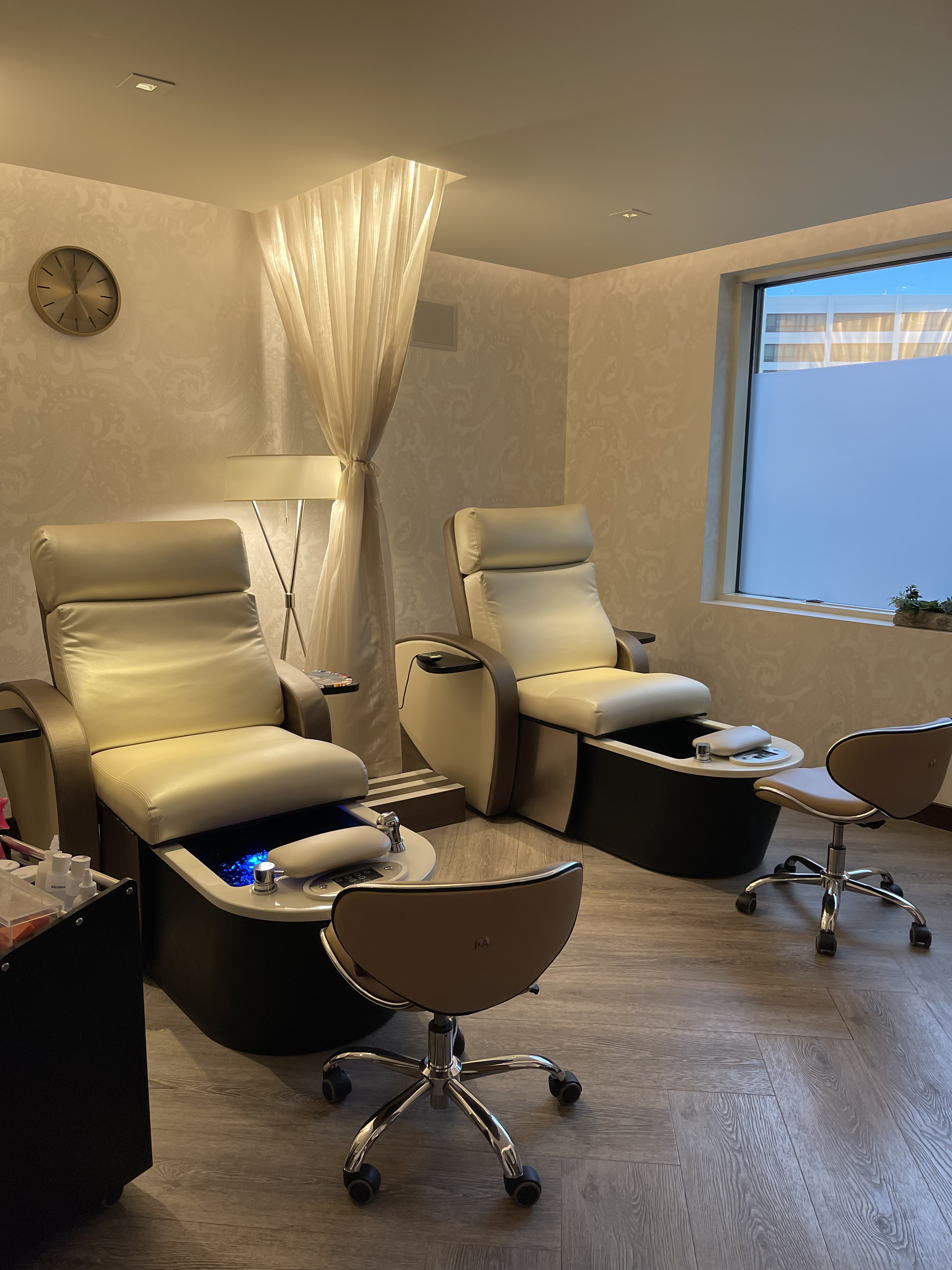
Pedicure area at the Spa at the Silver Legacy Resort Casino in Reno, Nevada.

Nail salons offer the following services:

- Manicures
- Pedicures
- Acrylic overlays and extensions
- UV gel overlays and extensions
- Dip powder nails
- SNS nails
- Silk/fibreglass overlays and extensions
- Nail design
- Nail art
- Shellac nails
- Eyelash extensions
- Eyebrow tinting

== Wages and working conditions ==
Nail salon wages and working conditions in New York City, a major center for nail salons in North America, are poor. In May 2015, an investigation by the New York State Department of Labor, which had been tipped off by a New York Times investigation, had been productive but was incomplete.

=== Working conditions ===
There is some evidence to suggest that nail salon workers are subjected to potentially unjust, hazardous working conditions. In surveys conducted on Vietnamese-American nail salon workers, many responses suggested that the work environment may cause negative health consequences. According to Standard 62-1989: Ventilation for Acceptable Indoor Quality of the American Society for Heating, Refrigeration, Air Conditioning Engineers, adequate supply of outdoor air should be about 20 cubic feet per minute per occupant. This necessitates multiple pathways for air to enter and exit the room. Such pathways include, but are not limited to, windows and doors. The study revealed that one-third of the surveyed nail salons had only one single door for ventilation with no secondary air pathway.

Due to the nature of salon work, many nail technicians are required to wear masks and gloves. Other surveys conducted on similar worker populations revealed that 90% of workers wore masks and 70% wore gloves to work.

==== Chemical exposures ====
Nail technicians use beauty products like nail polish, nail polish removers, artificial nails, adhesives, and disinfectants throughout the day. Compared to the average individual, they are exposed to the chemical ingredients the products contain on a much higher magnitude. Some of the more potent chemicals are toluene, formaldehyde, ethyl methacrylate (EMA), and dibutyl phthalate (DBP). Organizations and coalitions, such as the National Healthy Nail and Beauty Salon Alliance, address worker rights and exposure concerns faced by nail technicians. These movements provide platforms for conversation regarding occupational safety and health, which is a part of environmental justice.

Some solvents used, such as acetone and ethyl acetate, are very flammable and should not be used near any flame.

==== Ergonomic hazards ====
The nail salon industry in the United States consists mostly of immigrant-owned small businesses that face not only cultural/linguistic barriers but also workplace hazards such as chemical and challenging work postures. Organizations such as the Occupational Safety and Health Administration (OSHA) have shed light on the risks of working in this industry in recent years with recommended workplace health practices available online. These range from protective factors such as use of masks or improving ventilation to the substitution of certain products. The nail industry is complex with multiple products entering the market.

Much of the current research available focuses on the chemical exposures and toxicological impacts on workers with few studies touching on the concern relating to ergonomics. Nail salon workers often report increased musculoskeletal symptoms such as neck, hand/wrist, lower back, and shoulder pain. Workplace factors can contribute to these symptoms such as poor body mechanics, repetitive movement, and work equipment. The repetitive and prolonged nature of nail salon work can lead to overuse and strain which may result in inflammation related injuries that are self-limiting. There is a lack of consistency in ergonomic training and knowledge of ergonomic hazards varies among workers in this industry. Some workers take pain relievers, practice yoga, stretch, walk/stand between clients, and/or adjust their posture during their work with customers. Other examples which are particular to engineering controls are nonadjustable worktables and the low position of a customer's feet when they sit in the pedicure chair can pose an ergonomic hazard, where the worker has to often bend their neck and hunch back forward.^{11}

== Relevant policies and regulations in the United States ==
=== State level ===
- California Safe Cosmetics Act of 2005(SB484)

Enacted in 2005, this senate bill requires the full disclosure of all ingredients of products sold in California to the California Department of Health Services. In addition, if the substances are known to cause cancer or reproductive harm, the products will be subject to investigation by the Division of Environmental and Occupational Disease Control.

- California Proposition 65 (1986)

Enacted in 1986, this proposition requires the state of California to publish a list of chemicals known to cause cancer, birth defects, or other reproductive harm. All California businesses with ten or more employees must also provide "clear and reasonable" warning before exposing any individual to a chemical on the aforementioned list.

=== Federal level ===
- Toxic Substances Control Act of 1976 (TSCA) (15 U.S.C § 2601)

Enacted in 1976, this federal act provides the Environmental Protection Agency(EPA) the authority to regulate certain chemical substances. Currently, cosmetics are excluded from regulation under the TSCA but there have been campaign efforts that hope to extend the EPA's regulatory jurisdiction to include cosmetics.
