= Acetyl-CoA carboxytransferase =

Type of transferase enzyme

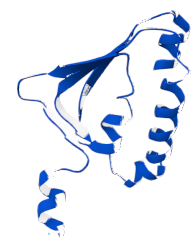
- The enzyme as folded by AlphaFold

Identifiers
- EC no.: 2.1.3.15

Databases
- BRENDA: enzyme data
- ExPASy: NiceZyme view
- KEGG: enzyme entry
- MetaCyc: metabolic pathway
- Rhea: reactions
- PDB structures: RCSB PDB PDBe PDBsum
Search
- PMC: articles
- PubMed: articles
- NCBI: proteins

Acetyl-CoA carboxytransferase (known also as accAD and N6-carboxybiotinyl-L-lysine:acetyl-CoA:carboxytransferase) is a transferase enzyme that catalyses the transfer of a carboxyl group from a biotinylated biotin carboxyl carrier protein (abbrev. BCCP) to acetyl coenzyme A, yielding malonyl-CoA. In some species, this is part of a multi-domain protein that also has the carrier protein as well as biotin carboxylase. Some enzymes can also carry out the carboxylation of propanonyl-CoA and butanoyl-CoA. The enzyme catalyzes the following reaction,

N6-carboxybiotinylysyl + acetyl-CoA = N6-biotinylysyl + malonyl-CoA

The enzyme characterised from Acidianus brierleyi is involved in several biochemical pathways, including the 3-hydroxypropanoate cycle, 4-hydroxybutanate cycle, the assembly of biotin-carboxyl carrier proteins, candicidin biosynthesis, fatty acid biosynthesis and glyoxylate assimilation.
