= Ammonium palmitate =

Names
- IUPAC name azanium;hexadecanoate
- Other names Hexadecanoic acid ammonium salt

Identifiers
| CAS Number | 593-26-0 |
| 3D model (JSmol) | Interactive image |
| ChemSpider | 62193 |
| ECHA InfoCard | 100.008.897 |
| EC Number | 209-785-6 |
| PubChem CID | 68971 |
| UNII | W0481SHF2Z |
| CompTox Dashboard (EPA) | DTXSID40883455 |
- InChI: InChI=1S/C16H32O2.H3N/c1-2-3-4-5-6-7-8-9-10-11-12-13-14-15-16(17)18;/h2-15H2,1H3,(H,17,18);1H3 Key: LRIHKZMLMWYPFS-UHFFFAOYSA-N
- SMILES: CCCCCCCCCCCCCCCC(=O)O.N

Properties
| Chemical formula | C_{16}H_{35}NO_{2} |
| Molar mass | 273.461 g·mol^{−1} |
| Appearance | Yellow-white powder |
| Density | 1.79 g/cm^{3} |
| Boiling point | 340.6 °C |
| Solubility in water | soluble |

Hazards
| Flash point | 154.1 °C |
- Except where otherwise noted, data are given for materials in their standard state (at 25 °C [77 °F], 100 kPa). Infobox references

Ammonium palmitate is a chemical compound with the chemical formula CH_{3}(CH_{2})_{14}COONH_{4}. This is an organic ammonium salt of palmitic acid.

== Synthesis ==
Ammonium palmitate can be prepared by reacting palmitic acid and excess 28-30% NH_{3}-solution.

== Physical properties ==
Ammonium palmitate forms yellow-white powder, soluble in water. It is slightly soluble in benzene and xylene, practically insoluble in acetone, ethanol, methanol, CCl_{4}, or naphtha.

X-ray diffraction studies of ammonium palmitate show crystals that belong to monoclinic space group P2_{1}/n.

== Uses ==
The compound is used to produce waterproofing fabrics and for thickening lubricants.
