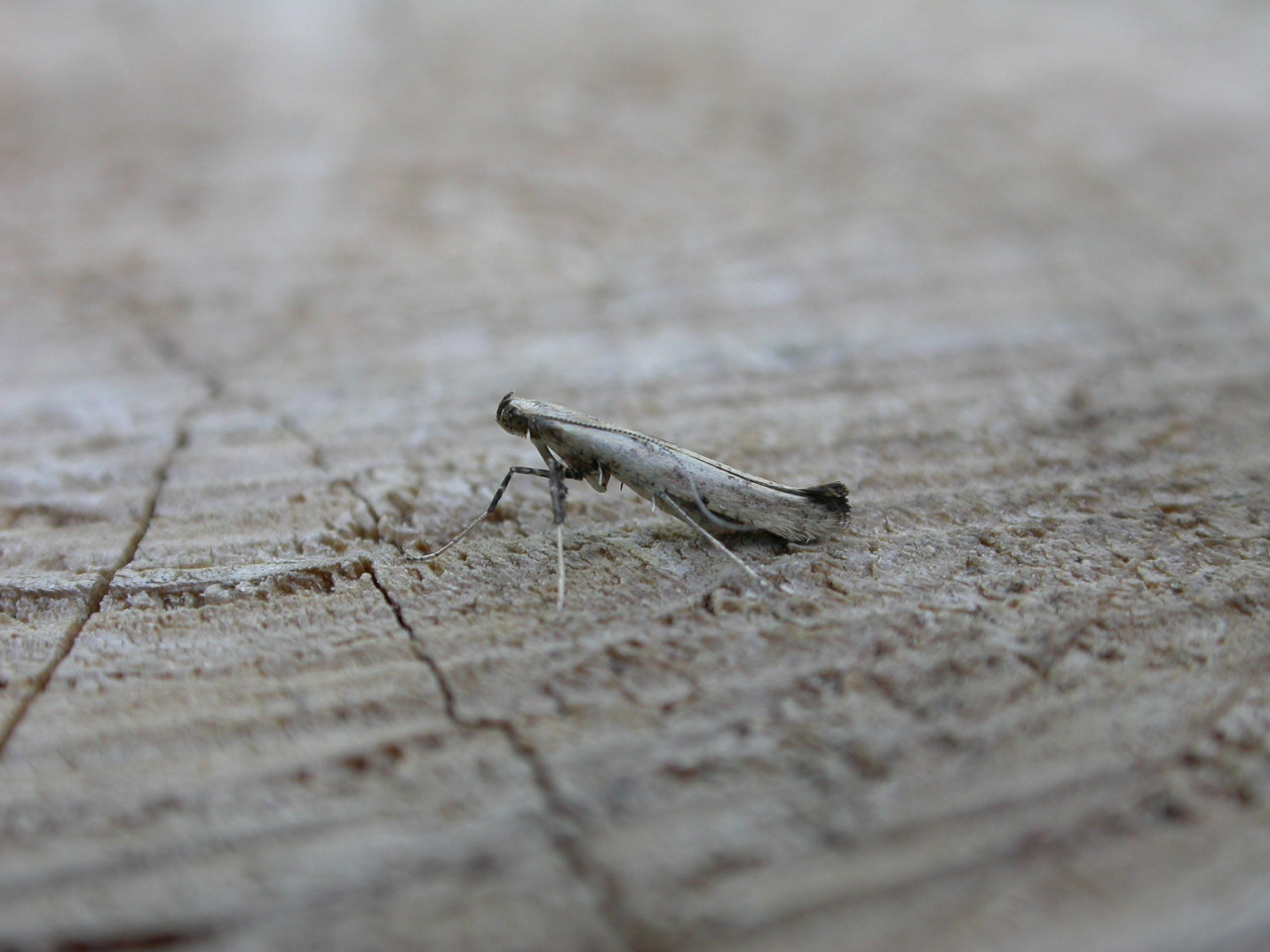

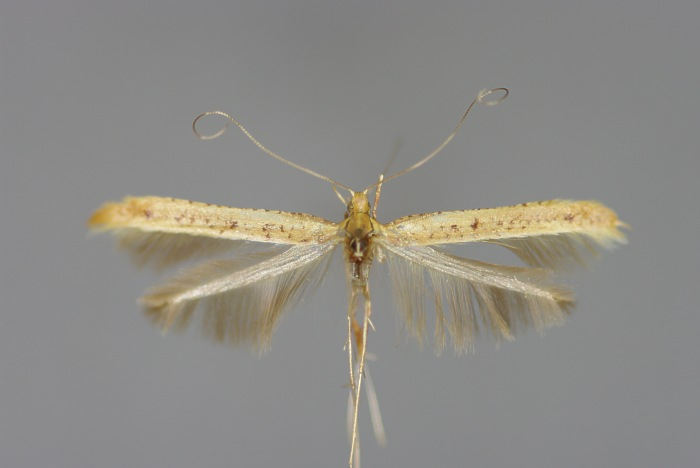

Scientific classification
- Domain: Eukaryota
- Kingdom: Animalia
- Phylum: Arthropoda
- Class: Insecta
- Order: Lepidoptera
- Family: Gracillariidae
- Genus: Caloptilia
- Species: C. betulicola

Binomial name
- Caloptilia betulicola (M. Hering, 1928)

Synonyms
- Gracilaria betulicola M. Hering, 1928; Caloptilia dissecta (Strand, 1902); Caloptilia punctella (Strand, 1901)

= Caloptilia betulicola =

Red birch slender

Species of moth

Caloptilia betulicola, the red birch slender, is a moth of the family Gracillariidae. It is found from Scandinavia and the north of European Russia to the Pyrenees and Alps and from Ireland to Poland and Slovakia. In the east it is found up to China, Japan and the Russian Far East.

The wingspan is 14–16 millimetres (0.55–0.63 in). It is very similar to Caloptilia elongella and both species are quite variable.Identification requires microscopic examination of the genitalia.

There are two generations per year, with adults on wing in June and July and again in September and October.

The larvae feed on Betula pendula and Betula pubecens. They mine the leaves of their host plant.
