= Omega hydroxy acid =

Class of chemical compunds

Omega hydroxy acids (ω-hydroxy acids) are a class of naturally occurring straight-chain aliphatic organic acids n carbon atoms long with a carboxyl group at position 1 (the starting point for the family of carboxylic acids), and a hydroxyl at terminal position n where n > 3. They are a subclass of hydroxycarboxylic acids. The C16 and C18 omega hydroxy acids 16-hydroxy palmitic acid and 18-hydroxy stearic acid are key monomers of cutin in the plant cuticle. The polymer cutin is formed by interesterification of omega hydroxy acids and derivatives of them that are substituted in mid-chain, such as 10,16-dihydroxy palmitic acid. Only the epidermal cells of plants synthesize cutin.

Omega hydroxy fatty acids also occur in animals. Cytochrome P450 (CYP450) microsome ω-hydroxylases such as CYP4A11, CYP4A22, CYP4F2, and CYP4F3 in humans, Cyp4a10 and Cyp4a12 in mice, and Cyp4a1, Cyp4a2, Cyp4a3, and Cyp4a8 in rats metabolize arachidonic acid and many arachidonic acid metabolites to their corresponding omega hydroxyl products. This metabolism of arachidonic acid produces 20-hydroxyarachidonic acid (i.e. 20-hydroxyeicosatetraeonic acid or 20-HETE), a bioactive product involved in various physiological and pathological processes; and this metabolism of certain bioactive arachidonic acid metabolites such as leukotriene B4 and 5-hydroxyicosatetraenoic acid produces 20-hydroxylated products which are 100- to 1,000-fold weaker than, and therefore represents the inactivation of, their respective precursors.

== List ==
The definition for "omega" includes number of carbons (C#) greater or equal to three. Lower numbers are included here to match the formula pattern C_{n}H_{2n}O_{3}.

C#	trivial name	systematic name	melting point °C	formula	SMILES	CASNo	PubChem CID	ChemSpiderID	UNII	ChEBI	occurrence
2	Glycolic acid	2-Hydroxyethanoic acid	75	C_{2}H_{4}O_{3}	OCC(=O)O	79-14-1	757	737	0WT12SX38S	17497	plants
3	Hydroacrylic acid	3-Hydroxypropionic acid	139-140	C_{3}H_{6}O_{3}	OCCC(=O)O	503-66-2	68152	61460			
4	gamma-Hydroxybutyric acid	4-Hydroxybutanoic acid	?	C_{4}H_{8}O_{3}	OCCCC(=O)O	591-81-1	10413	9984	30IW36W5B2	30830	human neurotransmitter
5	5-hydroxyvaleric acid	5-Hydroxypentanoic acid		C_{5}H_{10}O_{3}	OCCCCC(=O)O	13392-69-3	25945	24171	H5EVV4LP59	45564	from engineered Corynebacterium glutamicum
6	6-Hydroxycaproic acid	6-Hydroxyhexanoic acid		C_{6}H_{12}O_{3}	OCCCCCC(=O)O	1191-25-9	14490	13835	3Y3OX37NM8	17869	
7	7-Hydroxyheptanoic acid			C_{7}H_{14}O_{3}	OCCCCCCC(=O)O	3710-42-7	138016	121660		79112	
8	omega-hydroxycaprylic acid	8-hydroxyoctanoic acid		C_{8}H_{16}O_{3}	OCCCCCCCC(=O)O	764-89-6	69820	63018		79162	
9	9-hydroxypelargonic acid	9-hydroxynonanoic acid		C_{9}H_{18}O_{3}	OCCCCCCCCC(=O)O	3788-56-5	138052	121694	HV672SU12G	79121	
10	10-hydroxycapric acid	10-hydroxydecanoic acid		C_{10}H_{20}O_{3}	OCCCCCCCCCC(=O)O	1679-53-4	74300	66903	NP03XO416B	17409	
11	11-hydroxyundecanoic acid (11-HUDA)			C_{11}H_{22}O_{3}	OCCCCCCCCCCC(=O)O	3669-80-5	77237	69664	SD6J9LX2XK	79126	
12	sabinic acid	12-hydroxydodecanoic acid		C_{12}H_{24}O_{3}	OCCCCCCCCCCCC(=O)O	505-95-3	79034	71366	SUH3LR2K9D	39567	
13	13-hydroxytridecanoic acid			C_{13}H_{26}O_{3}	OCCCCCCCCCCCCC(=O)O	7735-38-8	139065	122656		79166	
14	ω-hydroxymyristic acid	14-hydroxytetradecanoic acid		C_{14}H_{28}O_{3}	OCCCCCCCCCCCCCC(=O)O	17278-74-9	084276	2341369		77168	engineered Candida tropicalis
15		15-hydroxypentadecanoic acid		C_{15}H_{30}O_{3}	OCCCCCCCCCCCCCCC(=O)O	4617-33-8	78360	70730	FU65P3692T	79169	Angelica archangelica
16	juniperic acid	16-hydroxyhexadecanoic acid		C_{16}H_{32}O_{3}	OCCCCCCCCCCCCCCCC(=O)O	506-13-8	10466	10034		55328	plant cuticle
17	17-hydroxyheptadecanoic acid			C_{17}H_{34}O_{3}	OCCCCCCCCCCCCCCCCC(=O)O	13099-34-8	4308451	3513977		79177	Pinus radiata
18	ω-hydroxystearic acid	18-hydroxyoctadecanoic acid		C_{18}H_{36}O_{3}	OCCCCCCCCCCCCCCCCCC(=O)O	3155-42-8	5282915	4446042	CCR5P6ICT2	79182	plant cutin
19	19-hydroxynonadecanoic acid			C_{19}H_{38}O_{3}	OCCCCCCCCCCCCCCCCCCC(=O)O		5282917	4446044		79179	
20	ω-hydroxyarachidic acid	20-hydroxyicosanoic acid		C_{20}H_{40}O_{3}	OCCCCCCCCCCCCCCCCCCCC(=O)O	62643-46-3	5282919	4446046		79190	stem and seed cutin
21	21-hydroxyhenicosanoic acid			C_{21}H_{42}O_{3}	OCCCCCCCCCCCCCCCCCCCCC(=O)O		5282920	4446047		79195	
22	22-hydroxybehenic acid	22-Hydroxydocosanoic acid		C_{22}H_{44}O_{3}	OCCCCCCCCCCCCCCCCCCCCCC(=O)O	506-45-6	5282922	4446049		76322	
23	23-hydroxytricosanoic acid			C_{23}H_{46}O_{3}	OCCCCCCCCCCCCCCCCCCCCCCC(=O)O	61658-18-2	11760442	9935141			cutin
24	24-hydroxytetracosanoic acid			C_{24}H_{48}O_{3}	OCCCCCCCCCCCCCCCCCCCCCCCC(=O)O	75912-18-4	5312780	4472205			
25	25-hydroxypentacosanoic acid			C_{25}H_{50}O_{3}	OCCCCCCCCCCCCCCCCCCCCCCCCC(=O)O	82612-07-5	14325176	57507583			
26	ω-hydroxycerotic acid	26-hydroxyhexacosanoic acid		C_{26}H_{52}O_{3}	OCCCCCCCCCCCCCCCCCCCCCCCCCC(=O)O	506-47-8	5312785	4472210		76325	
27	27-hydroxyheptacosanoic acid			C_{27}H_{54}O_{3}	OCCCCCCCCCCCCCCCCCCCCCCCCCCC(=O)O		14325177	13739624		84861	
28	28-hydroxyoctacosanoic acid			C_{28}H_{56}O_{3}	OCCCCCCCCCCCCCCCCCCCCCCCCCCCC(=O)O	52900-17-1	5312786	4472211		84863	
29	omega-hydroxynonacosanoic acid	29-hydroxynonacosanoic acid		C_{29}H_{58}O_{3}	OCCCCCCCCCCCCCCCCCCCCCCCCCCCCC(=O)O		14325178	34449103		84865	
30	30-hydroxytriacontanoic acid			C_{30}H_{60}O_{3}	OCCCCCCCCCCCCCCCCCCCCCCCCCCCCCC(=O)O	52900-18-2	5312787	4472212		76220	

== See also ==
- Alpha hydroxy acid
- Beta hydroxy acid
