= Pavement cells =

Pavement cells are a cell type found in the outermost epidermal layer of plants. The main purpose of these cells is to form a protective layer for the more specialized cells below. The arrangement and undulating geometry of these cells are demonstrated to enhance the epidermal tear resistance by extending the path of cracks and hindering their progression along cell interfaces, thereby preserving the plant epidermal integrity. This layer helps decrease water loss, maintain an internal temperature, keep the inner cells in place, and resist the intrusion of any outside material. They also separate stomata apart from each other as stomata have at least one pavement cell between each other.

They do not have a regular shape. Rather, their irregular shapes help them to interlock with each other like puzzle pieces to form a sturdy layer. This irregular shape that each individual cell takes on can be influenced by the cytoskeleton and specific proteins. As the leaf grows, the pavement cells will also grow, divide, and synthesize new vacuoles, plasma membrane parts, and cell wall components. A thick external cell wall influences the direction of growth by impeding expansion towards the outside of the cell and instead promote expansion parallel to the epidermis layer. Data suggest that waviness of pavement cells may be initiated by buckling due to compressive mechanical stresses resulting from turgor and growth in confined space, with a feedback loop that solidifies and augments cell shapes resulting in local reinforcement of the cell wall.
