= SN2 Palmitate =

SN2 Palmitate is a structured triglyceride where palmitic acid is bonded to the middle position (sn-2) of the glycerol backbone. Structured triglycerides are achieved through an enzymatic process using vegetable oils. Current usage of structured triglycerides is mainly for infant formula providing a human milk fat substitute.

== SN2 Palmitate in human milk ==
Fats in human breast milk provides about 50% of the energy needed for the development and growth of a newborn infant. About 98% of the fats provided by human milk are in the form of triglycerides, which themselves are molecules consisting of mixtures of three fatty acids bonded to sn-1, sn-2, and sn-3 positions of a glycerol backbone. The human mammary gland provides the baby with a unique fat composition where the fatty acids arranged in specific combinations, different from the triglycerides in other human tissues and plasma, or from common dietary fats and oils. Palmitic acid (C16:0) is the major saturated fatty acid in human milk, accounting for 17-25% of the total fatty acids, with over 70% of 16:0 is esterified at the milk triglyceride sn-2 position. The major unsaturated fatty acid in human milk is oleic acid (18:1n-9) and this is mostly esterified at the triglyceride sn-1,3 (outer) positions. The positioning of palmitic acid at the sn-2 position is conserved in all women, regardless of race or nutrition, unlike the general fatty acid profile of human milk.

== SN2 Palmitate in infant formula ==
The development of the sn-2 Palmitate structured triglycerides enables the mimicking of both the composition as well as the structure of human milk fat. Vegetable oils that are commonly used as source for infant formula fat have the opposite structure where the palmitic is located mainly at sn-1 and sn-3 positions. Enzymatic process on vegetable oils enables changing the position of palmitic acid to the sn-2 position. Clinical studies in preterm and term infants, as well as preclinical animal model studies, show that enrichment of infant formula with sn-2 Palmitate results in increased fat absorption, reduced calcium soaps formation and stool hardness, increased calcium retention and larger skeletal mineral deposition.

== Physiology of triglycerides absorption ==
Triglyceride digestion by endogenous lipases leads to hydrolysis of fatty acids from the triacylglyceride sn-1,3 positions, to release two fatty acids and one sn-2 monoglyceride into the intestinal lumen. The fatty acids configuration on the triglyceride has a major contribution to the efficacy of this nutrient absorption. While the unsaturated and short chain saturated free fatty acids are well absorbed regardless of their position, the absorption of free long chain saturated fatty acids, i.e. palmitic acid and longer, is relatively low. The main cause for this low absorption is their melting point above body temperature (≈63°C), and thus high tendency to create complexes with dietary minerals, such as calcium or magnesium which are secreted into feces leading to loss of both fatty acids (energy) and calcium. These complexes, also known as fatty acids soaps, are insoluble and therefore indigestible and positively related to stool hardness.

== Efficacy of SN2 Palmitate in infants ==
=== SN2 Palmitate and bone ===
Litmanovitz et al. applied the bone speed of sound (SOS) ultrasound technology in a randomized, controlled, double-blind clinical study of bone parameters in term infants and showed that infants fed formula containing sn-2 Palmitate (INFAT®) had higher bone SOS compared to infants fed formula with standard vegetable oil blends at age of 12 weeks. The bone SOS measures for infants fed the sn-2 Palmitate formula were also comparable to those of the group of breast-fed infants

=== SN2 Palmitate and Intestinal health ===
The intestinal microflora is an essential “organ” which serves numerous important functions, including protection against pathogens and modulation of inflammatory and immune responses, provision of metabolic intermediates and some vitamins, and regulation of intestinal epithelial proliferation and intestinal maturation. Yaron et al. showed that infants fed formula containing sn-2 Palmitate had higher numbers of Lactobacilli and Bifidobacteria after 6 weeks of feeding than infants fed a control formula with standard vegetable oils. Another recent experimental study published by Lu et al. has used the MUC2 deficient mice to address the possible role of milk palmitic acid content and positioning in triglycerides on intestinal inflammation.

=== SN2 Palmitate and Infant behavior ===
"Stereo-specific positioning of fatty acids in human milk triglycerides involves preferential positioning of the saturated fatty acid palmitic acid (16:0) at the sn-2 position, rather than at the sn-1,3 positions, as is typical of human tissue and plasma lipids, and vegetable oils common in human diets." Early infant crying is considered to reflect basic, instinctive responses governed by neurochemical mechanisms similar to those that control feeding and drinking (i.e., spontaneous behaviors). Term infants fed formula with sn-2 Palmitate for the 12 weeks after birth demonstrated lower crying duration during the day and night compared to infants fed a standard vegetable oil

== See also ==
- Palmitic acid
