= Acrylic acid =

Chemical compound (CH2=CHCOOH)

- Skeletal formula

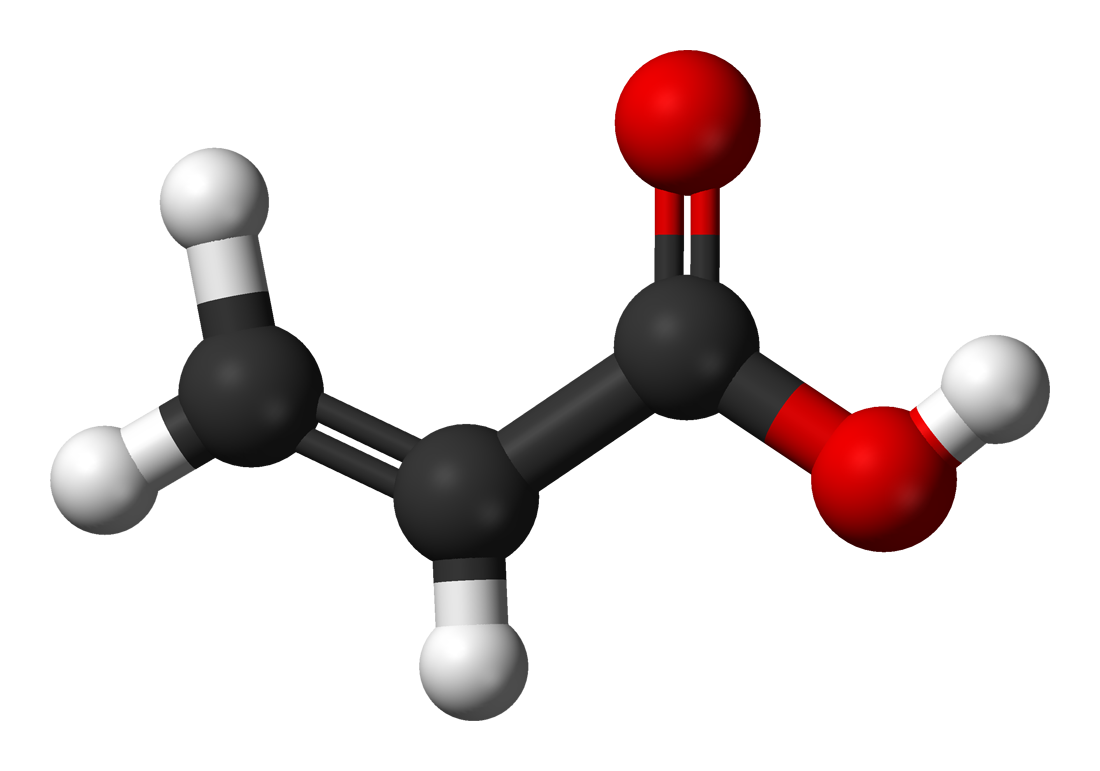
- Ball-and-stick model

Names
- IUPAC name Acrylic acid
- Preferred IUPAC name Prop-2-enoic acid
- Other names: Acrylic acid; Acroleic acid; Ethylenecarboxylic acid; Propenoic acid; Vinylformic acid; Methyleneacetic acid

Identifiers
CAS Number	79-10-7
3D model (JSmol)	Interactive image; Interactive image
Beilstein Reference	635743
ChEBI	CHEBI:18308
ChEMBL	ChEMBL1213529
ChemSpider	6333
DrugBank	DB02579
ECHA InfoCard	100.001.071
EC Number	201-177-9
Gmelin Reference	1817
KEGG	D03397
PubChem CID	6581
RTECS number	AS4375000
UNII	J94PBK7X8S
UN number	2218
CompTox Dashboard (EPA)	DTXSID0039229
- InChI: InChI=1S/C3H4O2/c1-2-3(4)5/h2H,1H2,(H,4,5) Key: NIXOWILDQLNWCW-UHFFFAOYSA-N; InChI=1/C3H4O2/c1-2-3(4)5/h2H,1H2,(H,4,5) Key: NIXOWILDQLNWCW-UHFFFAOYAJ
- SMILES: O=C(O)C=C; C=CC(=O)O

Properties
Chemical formula	C_{3}H_{4}O_{2}
Molar mass	72.063 g/mol
Appearance	Clear, colorless liquid
Odor	Acrid
Density	1.051 g/mL
Melting point	14 °C (57 °F; 287 K)
Boiling point	141 °C (286 °F; 414 K)
Solubility in water	Miscible
log P	0.28
Vapor pressure	3 mmHg
Acidity (pK_{a})	4.25 (H_{2}O)
Viscosity	1.3 cP at 20 °C (68 °F)

Hazards
- GHS labelling
Pictograms	(GHS02: Flammable) (GHS05: Corrosive) (GHS07: Exclamation mark) (GHS06: Toxic) (GHS09: Environmental hazard)
Signal word	Danger
Hazard statements	H226, H302, H312, H314, H332, H400
Precautionary statements	P210, P233, P240, P241, P242, P243, P260, P264, P270, P271, P273, P280, P301+P312, P301+P330+P331, P302+P352, P303+P361+P353, P304+P312, P304+P340, P305+P351+P338, P310, P312, P321, P322, P330, P363, P370+P378, P391, P403+P235, P405, P501
NFPA 704 (fire diamond)	3 2 2
Flash point	49.4 °C (120.9 °F; 322.5 K)
Autoignition temperature	429 °C (804 °F; 702 K)
Explosive limits	2.4–8.02%
- NIOSH (US health exposure limits)
PEL (Permissible)	None
REL (Recommended)	TWA 2 ppm (6 mg/m^{3}) [skin]
IDLH (Immediate danger)	N.D.
Safety data sheet (SDS)	MSDS

Related compounds
Other anions	acrylate
Related carboxylic acids	acetic acid propionic acid lactic acid 3-hydroxypropionic acid malonic acid butyric acid crotonic acid
Related compounds	allyl alcohol propionaldehyde acrolein methyl acrylate
- Except where otherwise noted, data are given for materials in their standard state (at 25 °C [77 °F], 100 kPa). verify (what is ?) Infobox references

Acrylic acid (IUPAC: prop-2-enoic acid) is an organic compound with the formula CH_{2}=CHCOOH. It is the simplest unsaturated carboxylic acid, consisting of a vinyl group connected directly to a carboxylic acid terminus. This colorless liquid has a characteristic acrid or tart smell. It is miscible with water, alcohols, ethers, and chloroform. More than a million tons are produced annually.

== History ==
The word "acrylic" was coined in 1843, for a chemical derivative of acrolein, an acrid-smelling oil derived from glycerol.

== Production ==
Acrylic acid is produced by a 2-step oxidation of propylene with acrolein as an intermediate.

=== Historical methods ===
Because acrylic acid and its esters have long been valued commercially, many other methods have been developed. Most have been abandoned for economic or environmental reasons. An early method was the hydrocarboxylation of acetylene ("Reppe chemistry"):

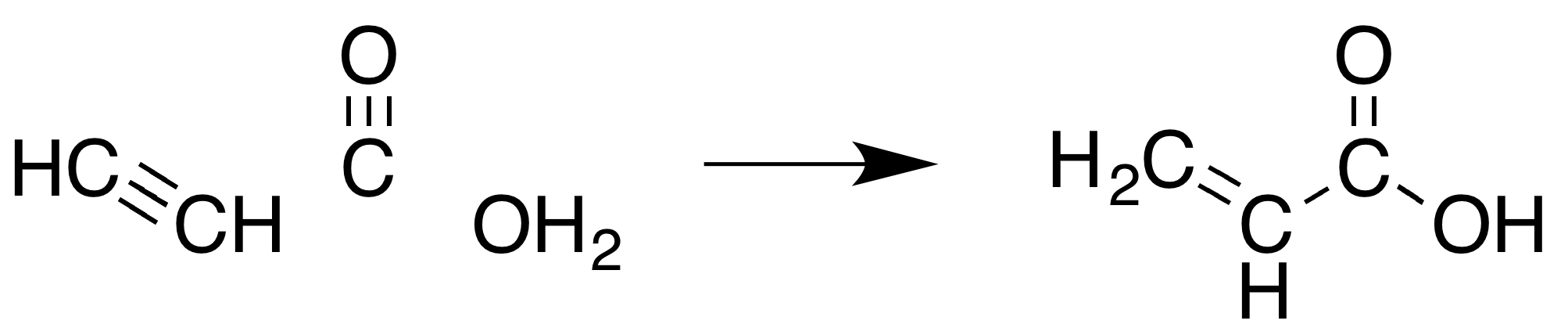

This method requires nickel carbonyl, high pressures of carbon monoxide, and acetylene, which is relatively expensive compared to propylene.

Acrylic acid was once manufactured by the hydrolysis of acrylonitrile, a material derived from propene by ammoxidation, but this route was abandoned because it cogenerates ammonium side products, which must be disposed of. Other now abandoned precursors to acrylic acid include ethenone and ethylene cyanohydrin.

=== Research ===
Carboxylating ethylene to acrylic acid under supercritical carbon dioxide is thermodynamically possible, but efficient catalysts have not been developed. 3-Hydroxypropionic acid (3HP), an acrylic-acid precursor by dehydration, can be produced from sugars, but the process is not competitive.

== Reactions and uses ==
Acrylic acid undergoes the typical reactions of a carboxylic acid. When reacted with an alcohol, it forms the corresponding ester. The esters and salts of acrylic acid are collectively known as acrylates (or propenoates). The most common alkyl esters of acrylic acid are methyl, butyl, ethyl, and 2-ethylhexyl acrylate.

Acrylic acid and its esters readily combine with themselves (to form polyacrylic acid) or other monomers (e.g. acrylamides, acrylonitrile, vinyl compounds, styrene, and butadiene) by reacting at their double bond, forming homopolymers or copolymers, which are used in the manufacture of various plastics, coatings, adhesives, elastomers, as well as floor polishes and paints.

Acrylic acid is used in many industries, including the diaper industry, the water treatment industry, and the textile industry. The annual worldwide consumption of acrylic acid is projected to reach more than an estimated 8,000 kilotons by 2020. This increase is expected due to its use in new applications, including personal care products, detergents, and products for adult incontinence.

== Substituents ==
As a substituent acrylic acid can be found as an acyl group or a carboxyalkyl group, depending on the removal of the group from the molecule.

More specifically, these are:

1. The acryloyl group, with the removal of the −OH from carbon-1.
2. The 2-carboxyethenyl group, with the removal of a −H from carbon-3. This substituent group is found in chlorophyll c.

== Safety ==
Acrylic acid is severely irritating and corrosive to the skin and the respiratory tract. Eye contact can result in severe and irreversible injury. Low exposure will cause minimal or no health effects, while high exposure could result in pulmonary edema. The LD_{50} is 340 mg/kg (rat, oral) with the lowest recorded LD_{50} being 293 mg/kg (oral, rat), comparable to ethylene glycol, which is indicative of being a potent poison. Ethyl acrylate was once used as a synthetic food flavoring and was withdrawn by the FDA possibly due to carcinogenic effects observed in lab animals.

Animal studies showed that high doses of acrylic acid decreased weight gain. Acrylic acid can be converted to non-toxic lactic acid.

Acrylic acid is a constituent of tobacco smoke.

== See also ==
- Methacrylic acid
- Acryloyl chloride
- Acrylamide
- Acrylate polymer
- Sodium polyacrylate
