= 2-Hydroxy-4-(methylthio)butyric acid =

Names
- Preferred IUPAC name 2-Hydroxy-4-(methylsulfanyl)butanoic acid
- Other names: 2-Hydroxy-4-(methylthio)-butanoic acid; α-Hydroxy-γ-(methylthio)-butyric acid; Desmeninol; Alimet

Identifiers
CAS Number	583-91-5
3D model (JSmol)	Interactive image
ChEBI	CHEBI:137228
ChEMBL	ChEMBL2104213
ChemSpider	10946
DrugBank	DB15832
ECHA InfoCard	100.008.659
EC Number	209-523-0
PubChem CID	11427
UNII	Z94465H1Y7
CompTox Dashboard (EPA)	DTXSID50862236
- InChI: InChI=1S/C5H10O3S/c1-9-3-2-4(6)5(7)8/h4,6H,2-3H2,1H3,(H,7,8) Key: ONFOSYPQQXJWGS-UHFFFAOYSA-N
- SMILES: CSCCC(O)C(O)=O

Properties
Chemical formula	C_{5}H_{10}O_{3}S
Molar mass	150.19 g·mol^{−1}
Appearance	colorless or white solid

Hazards
- GHS labelling
Pictograms	(GHS05: Corrosive) (GHS07: Exclamation mark)
Signal word	Danger
Hazard statements	H315, H318, H412
Precautionary statements	P264, P264+P265, P273, P280, P302+P352, P305+P354+P338, P317, P321, P332+P317, P362+P364, P501
- Except where otherwise noted, data are given for materials in their standard state (at 25 °C [77 °F], 100 kPa). Infobox references

2-Hydroxy-4-(methylthio)butyric acid is an organic compound with the structural formula CH_{3}SCH_{2}CH_{2}CH(OH)CO_{2}H. It is a white solid. In terms of functional groups, the molecule is a α-hydroxy carboxylic acid and a thioether. The compound is structurally related to the amino acid methionine by replacement of the amine with a hydroxy group.

The compound is produced commercially in racemic form from acrolein by conjugate addition of methanethiol followed by formation and hydrolysis of a cyanohydrin. it is used as a substitute for methionine in animal feed.

In nature, the compound is also an intermediate in the biosynthesis of 3-dimethylsulfoniopropionate, precursor to natural dimethyl sulfide.
