= Hydroxypropionic acid =

Acid name

Hydroxypropionic acid, or alternately hydroxypropanoic acid, may refer to either of two isomeric chemical compounds:

- 2-Hydroxypropionic acid (lactic acid)
- 3-Hydroxypropionic acid (hydracrylic acid)

The carboxylate is known as hydroxypropionate or hydroxypropanoate.
