= Personal Care Products Council =

American trade association

Personal Care Products Council (United States)
- Formation: 1894
- Headquarters: (United States) Washington, D.C.
- Members: Approx. 600 companies
- President & CEO: Thomas Myers
- Website: personalcarecouncil.org

The Personal Care Products Council (PCPC) is an American trade association. The PCPC was founded in 1894 as the Manufacturing Perfumers' Association, renamed the American Manufacturers of Toilet Articles (AMTA) in 1922, and renamed again as the Cosmetic, Toiletry, and Fragrance Association (CTFA) in 1970. The current name was adopted in November 2007.

== Organizational structure ==
In November 2023, Thomas F. Myers was appointed President and CEO of the Personal Care Products Council, replacing President Lezlee Westine.

The organization has five main departments:

- Science handles research and development.
- Government Affairs conducts federal and state lobbying.
- Global Strategies monitors and takes action on international cosmetic regulation.
- Legal and Regulatory takes appropriate action on court decisions and regulatory agencies.
- Public Affairs and Communications communicates industry messages to the media and other stakeholders.

The Personal Care Products Council Foundation works with the American Cancer Society and the Professional Beauty Association to administer the Look Good Feel Better Program. The program aims to help cancer patients learn skin care and beauty techniques.

== Challenges ==
=== California Safe Cosmetics Act ===
CTFA reportedly spent over $600,000 on lobbyists in Sacramento in the months before the vote on Senate Bill 484 (California Safe Cosmetics Act of 2005) in an attempt to prevent the bill from passing.

=== Nanotechnology safety concerns ===
In 2006, Friends of the Earth and International Center for Technology Assessment filed a formal petition with the Food and Drug Administration for better monitoring and regulating of products containing harmful nanoparticles and stated they would sue if the FDA does not take adequate action in 180 days. CTFA vice president spoke out against the petition and stated, "I don't think there's anything to worry about ... All of the safety questions have been answered [in previous studies]."

=== Trivia ===
Everett Edward Kavanaugh was the head of the Council for two decades and is the father of Supreme Court Justice Brett Kavanaugh, nominated by Donald J. Trump in July 2018.

== See also ==
- Cosmetic Ingredient Review
