= California Safe Cosmetics Act of 2005 =

California Safe Cosmetics Act of 2005 (Senate Bill 484) is a state law that requires cosmetics manufacturers that sell products in the U.S. state of California to label any ingredient that is on state or federal lists of chemicals that cause cancer or birth defects. The law also demands manufacturers to supply any health-related information about cosmetic ingredients, and it authorized the California Occupational Safety and Health Administration (CalOSHA) to regulate the products used in salons. Senate Bill 484 was authored by Senator Carole Migden (D-San Francisco), was signed into law by Governor Arnold Schwarzenegger on October 7, 2005, and took effect on January 1, 2007. The Legislation was the first of its kind in the nation.

Procter & Gamble and the Cosmetic, Toiletry, and Fragrance Association (CTFA) reportedly spent over $690,000 in combined funds on lobbyists in the months before the vote on the bill to prevent the legislation from passing.
