= Epidermis (botany) =

Layer of cells that covers leaves, flowers, roots of plants

Cross-section of a flax plant stem: 1. pith; 2. protoxylem; 3. xylem; 4. phloem; 5. sclerenchyma (bast fibre); 6. cortex; 7. epidermis

The epidermis (from the Greek ἐπιδερμίς, meaning "over-skin") is a single layer of cells that covers the leaves, flowers, roots and stems of plants. It forms a boundary between the plant and the external environment. The epidermis serves several functions: it protects against water loss, regulates gas exchange, secretes metabolic compounds, and (especially in roots) absorbs water and mineral nutrients. The epidermis of most leaves shows dorsoventral anatomy: the upper (adaxial) and lower (abaxial) surfaces have somewhat different construction and in most cases serve different functions. Woody stems and some other stem structures such as potato tubers produce a secondary covering called the periderm that replaces the epidermis as the protective covering.

== Description ==
The epidermis is the outermost cell layer of the primary plant body. In some older works the cells of the leaf epidermis have been regarded as specialized parenchyma cells, but the established modern preference has long been to classify the epidermis as dermal tissue, whereas parenchyma is classified as ground tissue. The epidermis is the main component of the dermal tissue system of leaves (diagrammed below), and also stems, roots, flowers, fruits, and seeds; it is usually transparent (epidermal cells have fewer chloroplasts or lack them completely, except for the guard cells.)

The cells of the epidermis are structurally and functionally variable. Most plants have an epidermis that is one cell layer thick. Some plants like Ficus elastica and Peperomia, which have a periclinal cellular division within the protoderm of the leaves, have an epidermis with multiple cell layers. Epidermal cells are tightly linked to each other and provide mechanical strength and protection to the plant. Particularly, wavy pavement cells are suggested to play a pivotal role in preventing or guiding cracks in the epidermis. The walls of the epidermal cells of the above-ground parts of plants contain cutin, and are covered with a cuticle. The cuticle reduces water loss to the atmosphere, it is sometimes covered with wax in smooth sheets, granules, plates, tubes, or filaments. The wax layers give some plants a whitish or bluish surface color. Surface wax acts as a moisture barrier and protects the plant from intense sunlight and wind.

Diagram of fine scale leaf internal anatomy

The epidermal tissue includes several differentiated cell types: epidermal cells, guard cells, subsidiary cells, and epidermal hairs (trichomes). The epidermal cells are the most numerous, largest, and least specialized. These are typically more elongated in the leaves of monocots than in those of dicots.

Diagram of moderate scale leaf anatomy

Trichomes or hairs grow out from the epidermis in many species. In the root epidermis, epidermal hairs termed root hairs are common and are specialized for the absorption of water and mineral nutrients. Also hooked hairs have been observed in common bean (Phaseolus vulgaris) and collet hairs in Arabidopsis thaliana.

In plants with secondary growth, the epidermis of roots and stems is usually replaced by a periderm through the action of a cork cambium.

== Stoma complex ==
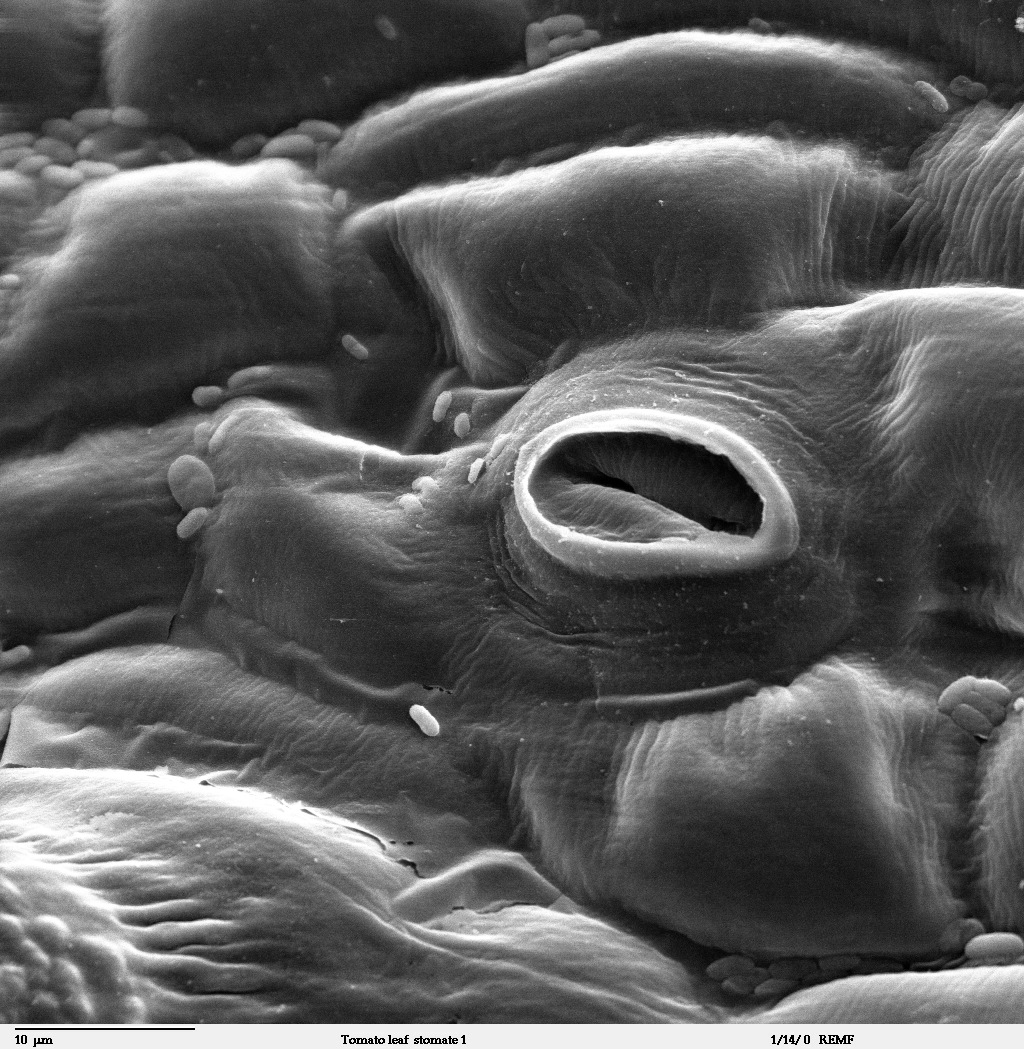
Stoma in a tomato leaf (microscope image)

The leaf and stem epidermis is covered with pores called stomata (sing; stoma), part of a stoma complex consisting of a pore surrounded on each side by chloroplast-containing guard cells, and two to four subsidiary cells that lack chloroplasts. The stomata complex regulates the exchange of gases and water vapor between the outside air and the interior of the leaf. Typically, the stomata are more numerous over the abaxial (lower) epidermis of the leaf than the (adaxial) upper epidermis. An exception is floating leaves where most or all stomata are on the upper surface. Vertical leaves, such as those of many grasses, often have roughly equal numbers of stomata on both surfaces. The stoma is bounded by two guard cells. The guard cells differ from the epidermal cells in the following aspects:

- The guard cells are bean-shaped in surface view, while the epidermal cells are irregular in shape
- The guard cells contain chloroplasts, so they can manufacture food by photosynthesis (The epidermal cells of terrestrial plants do not contain chloroplasts)
- Guard cells are the only epidermal cells that can make sugar. According to one theory, in sunlight, the concentration of potassium ions (K+) increases in the guard cells. This, together with the sugars formed, lowers the water potential in the guard cells. As a result, water from other cells enters the guard cells by osmosis so they swell and become turgid. Because the guard cells have a thicker cellulose wall on one side of the cell, i.e. the side around the stomatal pore, the swollen guard cells become curved and pull the stomata open.

At night, the sugar is used up and water leaves the guard cells, so they become flaccid and the stomatal pore closes. In this way, they reduce the amount of water vapor escaping from the leaf.

== Cell differentiation in the epidermis ==
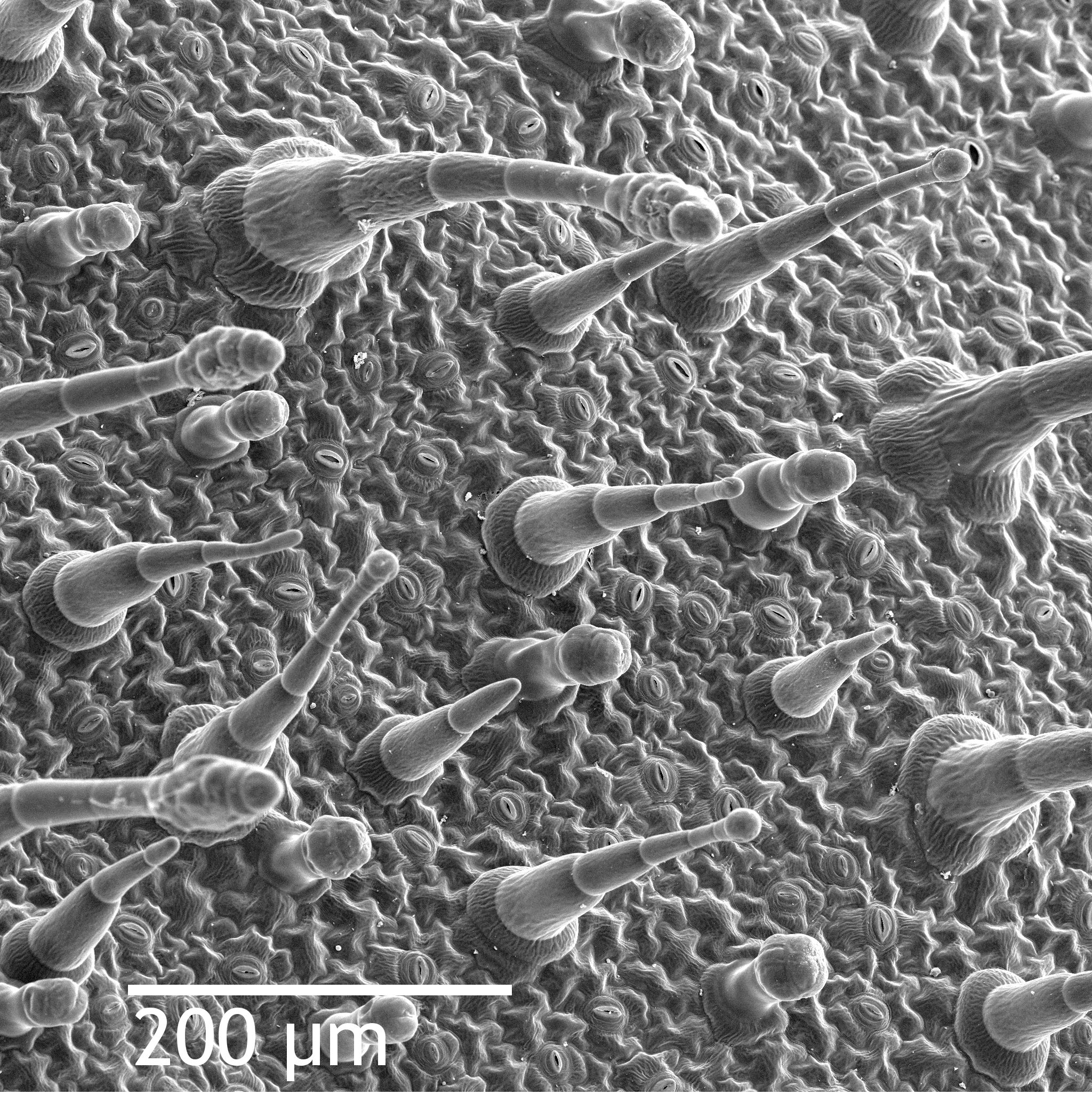
Scanning electron microscope image of Nicotiana alata leaf's epidermis, showing trichomes (hair-like appendages) and stomata (eye-shaped slits, visible at full resolution)

The plant epidermis consists of three main cell types: pavement cells, guard cells and their subsidiary cells that surround the stomata and trichomes, otherwise known as leaf hairs. The epidermis of petals also form a variation of trichomes called conical cells.

Trichomes develop at a distinct phase during leaf development, under the control of two major trichome specification genes: TTG and GL1. The process may be controlled by the plant hormones gibberellins, and even if not completely controlled, gibberellins certainly have an effect on the development of the leaf hairs. GL1 causes endoreplication, the replication of DNA without subsequent cell division as well as cell expansion. GL1 turns on the expression of a second gene for trichome formation, GL2, which controls the final stages of trichome formation causing the cellular outgrowth.

Arabidopsis thaliana uses the products of inhibitory genes to control the patterning of trichomes, such as TTG and TRY. The products of these genes will diffuse into the lateral cells, preventing them from forming trichomes and in the case of TRY promoting the formation of pavement cells.

Expression of the gene MIXTA, or its analogue in other species, later in the process of cellular differentiation will cause the formation of conical cells over trichomes. MIXTA is a transcription factor.

Stomatal patterning is a much more controlled process, as the stoma affects the plant's water retention and respiration capabilities. As a consequence of these important functions, differentiation of cells to form stomata is also subject to environmental conditions to a much greater degree than other epidermal cell types.

Stomata are pores in the plant epidermis that are surrounded by two guard cells, which control the opening and closing of the aperture. These guard cells are in turn surrounded by subsidiary cells which provide a supporting role for the guard cells.

Stomata begin as stomatal meristemoids. The process differs between dicots and monocots. Spacing is thought to be essentially random in dicots though mutants do show it is under some form of genetic control, but it is more controlled in monocots, where stomata arise from specific asymmetric divisions of protoderm cells. The smaller of the two cells produced becomes the guard mother cells. Adjacent epidermal cells will also divide asymmetrically to form the subsidiary cells.

Because stomata play such an important role in the plants' survival, collecting information on their differentiation is difficult by the traditional means of genetic manipulation, as stomatal mutants tend to be unable to survive. Thus the control of the process is not well understood. Some genes have been identified. TMM is thought to control the timing of stomatal initiation specification and FLP is thought to be involved in preventing the further division of the guard cells once they are formed.

Environmental conditions affect the development of stomata, in particular, their density on the leaf surface. It is thought that plant hormones, such as ethylene and cytokines, control the stomatal developmental response to the environmental conditions. Accumulation of these hormones appears to cause increased stomatal density such as when the plants are kept in closed environments.

== See also ==
- Bark
- Cork cambium
- Periderm
