= Cosmetic Ingredient Review =

- Industry: Cosmetics
- Founded: 1976
- Headquarters: Washington, D.C.
- Website: cir-safety.org

The Cosmetic Ingredient Review (CIR), based in Washington, D.C., assesses and reviews the safety of ingredients in cosmetics and publishes the results in peer-reviewed scientific literature. The company was established in 1976 by the Personal Care Products Council (then called the Cosmetic, Toiletry, and Fragrance Association), with support of the Food and Drug Administration and the Consumer Federation of America.

== Operations ==
In 2013, F. Alan Andersen, the CIR's director, said that its annual budget "is not a matter of public record". The CIR does not file Form 990s, which show annual revenues and expenses. Overall funding for CIR comes from the cosmetic industry's main trade association, the Personal Care Products Council.

However, the Personal Care Products Council, is a not-for-profit 501(c)(6) with 2022 revenue of $20.1 million. It paid its top 14 executives a total of $5,670,215 in 2022 and Lezlee Westine (CEO) salary was $1,292,491.

== Chemicals reviewed ==
In 2002, the CIR decided that it was safe for the industry to continue adding possible endocrine and reproductive disruptors known as phthalates to cosmetics marketed to women of childbearing age. In August 2008, Section 108 of the federal Consumer Product Safety Improvement Act (CPSIA), public law 110–314, banned the use of three phthalates, DEHP, DBP, and BBP, in children's toy and child care articles. Some phthalates were restricted in children's toys sold in California starting in 2009.
