= Alpha hydroxycarboxylic acid =

Class of chemical compounds

Structural formulae of α-, β- and γ-hydroxy acids

Alpha hydroxy carboxylic acids, or α-hydroxy carboxylic acids (AHAs), are a group of carboxylic acids featuring a hydroxy group located one carbon atom away from the acid group. This structural aspect distinguishes them from beta hydroxy acids, where the functional groups are separated by two carbon atoms. Notable AHAs include glycolic acid, lactic acid, mandelic acid, and citric acid.

α-Hydroxy acids are stronger acids compared to their non-alpha hydroxy counterparts, a property enhanced by internal hydrogen bonding. (Note: The strength of the hydrogen bonding is reflected also in the Proton nuclear magnetic resonance-spectrum of these compounds: instead of giving rise to a contribution to the broad signal of rapidly exchanged protons (between COOH, OH, NH, etc) in 2-phenyl-2-hydroxyacetic acid (mandelic acid) the proton on the alpha carbon and the proton trapped in the internal hydrogen bridge show a nice pair of doublets instead a singlet (H on alpha-C) and the formentioned broad signal of exchangable protons. So on the NMR-time scale the exchange equilibrium for the alpha-hydroxy group is frozen.) AHAs serve a dual purpose: industrially, they are utilized as additives in animal feed and as precursors for polymer synthesis. In cosmetics, they are commonly used for their ability to chemically exfoliate the skin.

== Occurrence ==
Aldonic acids, a type of sugar acid, are a class of naturally occurring hydroxycarboxylic acids. They have the general chemical formula, HO_{2}C(CHOH)_{n}CH_{2}OH. Gluconic acid, a particularly common aldonic acid, the oxidized derivative of glucose.

2-Hydroxy-4-(methylthio)butyric acid is an intermediate in the biosynthesis of 3-dimethylsulfoniopropionate, precursor to natural dimethyl sulfide.

== Synthesis ==
One common synthesis hydrolyzes the relatively common α-halocarboxylic acids to produce 2-hydroxycarboxylic acids. For instance, glycolic acid is typically produced industrially from chloroacetic acid through base hydrolysis and acid workup:

R−CH(Cl)CO_{2}H + H_{2}O → R−CH(OH)CO_{2}H + HCl

Another synthetic pathway adds hydrogen cyanide to ketones or aldehydes, with acidic hydrolysis of the cyanohydrin intermediate:

R−CHO + HCN → R−CH(OH)CN
R−CH(OH)CN + 2H_{2}O → R−CH(OH)CO_{2}H + NH_{3}

Further specialized synthetic routes are the reaction of dilithiated carboxylic acids with oxygen, followed by neutralization...

R−CHLiCO_{2}Li + O_{2} → R−CH(O_{2}Li)CO_{2}Li
R−CH(O_{2}Li)CO_{2}Li + H^{+} → R−CH(OH)CO_{2}H + 2Li^{+} + ...

...and the benzilic acid rearrangement of α-keto aldehydes:

R−C(O)CHO + 2OH^{−} → R−CH(OH)CO^{−}_{2} + H_{2}O

== Uses ==
The synthesis and utilization of polymers based on lactic acid, including polylactic acid (PLA) and its cyclic ester lactide, are used in the creation of biodegradable materials such as medical implants, drug delivery systems, and sutures. Similarly, glycolic acid serves as a foundation for the development of poly(glycolic acid), spelled polyglycolide (PGA), a polymer distinguished by its high crystallinity, thermal stability, and mechanical strength, despite its synthetic origins. Both PLA and PGA are fully biodegradable.

Furthermore, mandelic acid, another alpha hydroxy acid, when combined with sulfuric acid produces "SAMMA", obtained via condensation with sulfuric acid. Early laboratory work performed in 2002 and 2007 against notable pathogens such as the human immunodeficiency virus (HIV) and the herpes simplex virus (HSV) suggest SAMMA warrants further investigation as a topical microbicide to prevent vaginal sexually-transmitted infection transmission.

2-Hydroxy-4-(methylthio)butyric acid, alpha hydroxy carboxylic acid, is used commercially in a racemic mixture to substitute for methionine in animal feed.

α-Hydroxy acids, such as glycolic acid, lactic acid, citric acid, and mandelic acid, serve as precursors in organic synthesis, playing a role in the industrial-scale preparation of various compounds. These acids are used when synthesizing aldehydes through oxidative cleavage. α-Hydroxy acids are particularly prone to acid-catalyzed decarbonylation, yielding carbon monoxide, a ketone or aldehyde, and water as by-products.

== Safety ==
Alpha hydroxy acids are generally safe when used on the skin as a cosmetic agent using the recommended dosage. The most common side-effects are mild skin irritations, redness and flaking. The United States Food and Drug Administration (FDA) and Cosmetic Ingredient Review expert panels both suggest that alpha hydroxy acids are safe to use as long as they are sold at low concentrations, pH levels greater than 3.5, and include thorough safety instructions.

The FDA has warned consumers that care should be taken when using alpha hydroxy acids after an industry-sponsored study found that they can increase the likelihood of sunburns. This effect is reversible after stopping the use of alpha hydroxy acids. Other sources suggest that glycolic acid, in particular, may protect from sun damage.

== See also ==
- Beta hydroxy acid
- Hydroxybutyric acid
- Omega hydroxy acid
