= Cutan (polymer) =

Hydrocarbon polymer in the cuticle of plants

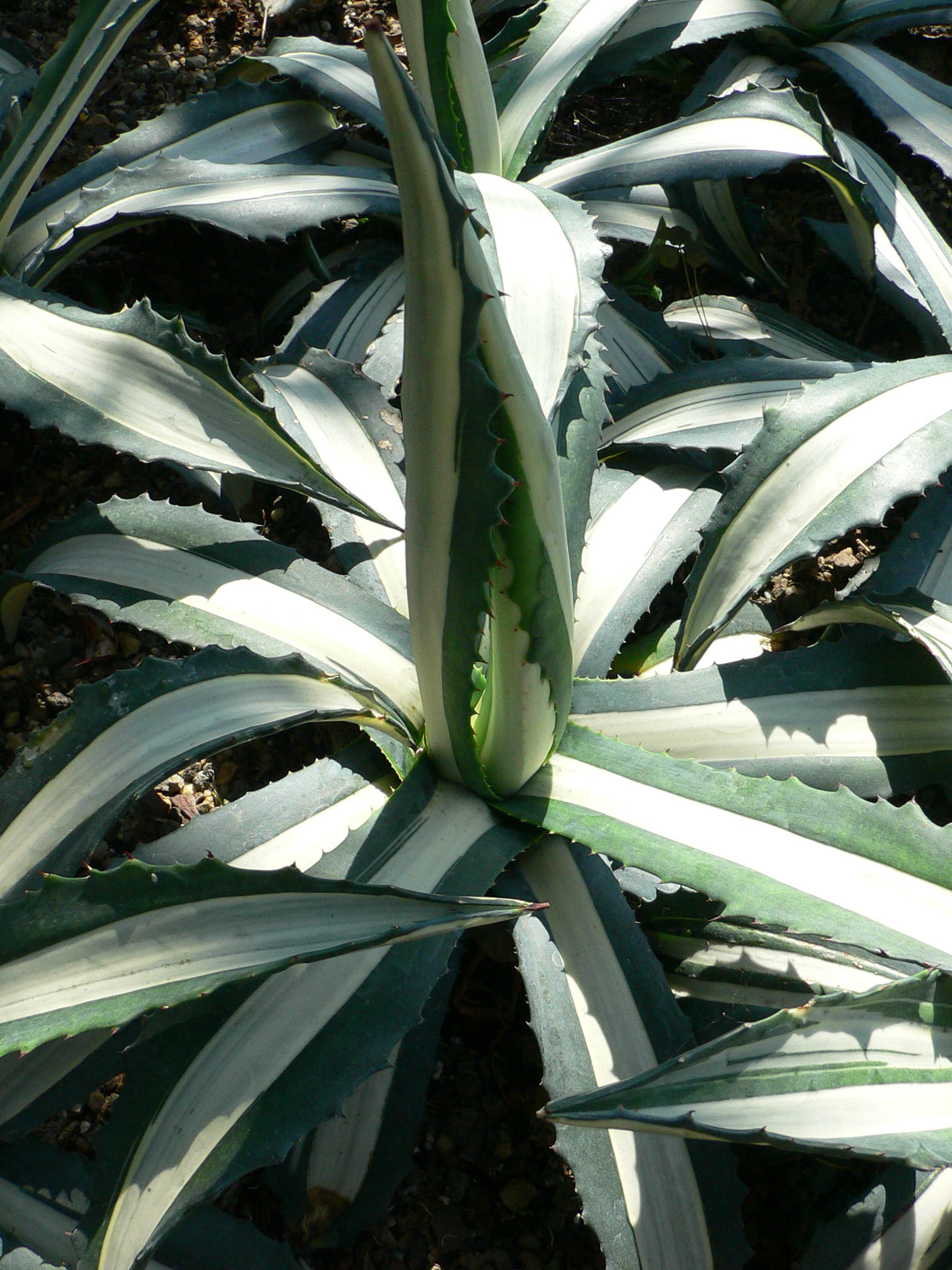

Cutan is one of two waxy biopolymers which occur in the cuticle of some plants. The other and better-known polymer is cutin. Cutan is believed to be a hydrocarbon polymer, whereas cutin is a polyester, but the structure and synthesis of cutan are not yet fully understood. Cutan is not present in as many plants as once thought; for instance it is absent in Ginkgo.

Cutan was first detected as a non-saponifiable component, resistant to de-esterification by alkaline hydrolysis, that increases in amount in cuticles of some species such as Clivia miniata as they reach maturity, apparently replacing the cutin secreted in the early stages of cuticle development. Evidence that cutan is a hydrocarbon polymer comes from the fact that its flash pyrolysis products are a characteristic homologous series of paired alkanes and alkenes, and through ^{13}C-NMR analysis of present-day and fossil plants.

Cutan's preservation potential is much greater than that of cutin. Despite this, the low proportion of cutan found in fossilized cuticle shows that it is probably not the cause for the widespread preservation of cuticle in the fossil record.
