= Plant cuticle =

Waterproof covering of aerial plant organs

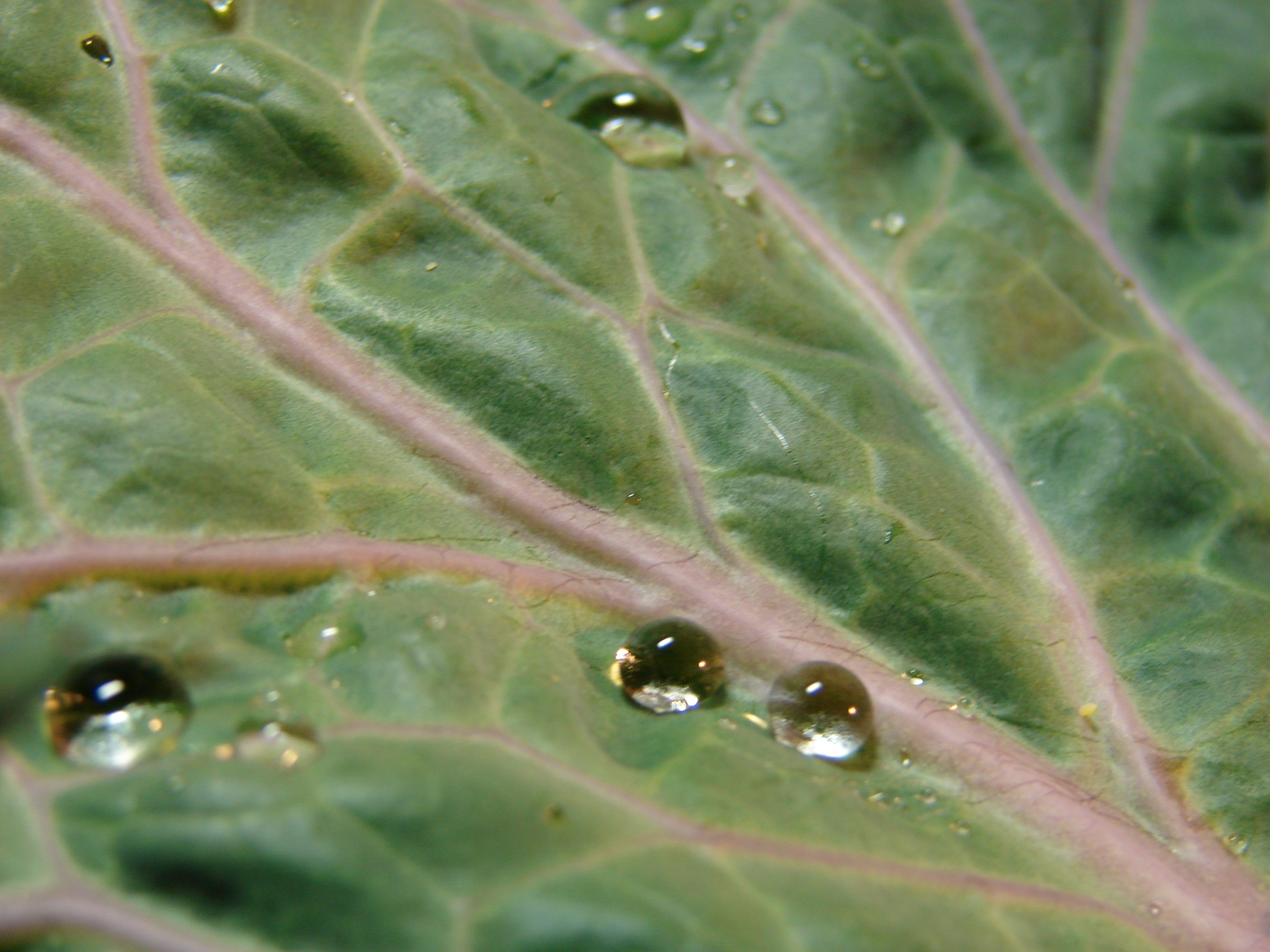
Water beads on the waxy cuticle of kale leaves

A plant cuticle is a protecting film covering the outermost skin layer (epidermis) of leaves, young shoots and other aerial plant organs (aerial here meaning all plant parts not embedded in soil or other substrate) that have no periderm. The film consists of lipid and hydrocarbon polymers infused with wax, and is synthesized exclusively by the epidermal cells.

== Description ==
Anatomy of a eudicot leaf

The plant cuticle is a layer composed of lipid polymers and waxes that is present on the outer surfaces of the primary organs of all vascular land plants. It is also present in the sporophyte generation of hornworts, and in both sporophyte and gametophyte generations of mosses. The plant cuticle forms a coherent outer covering of the plant that can be isolated intact by treating plant tissue with enzymes such as pectinase and cellulase.

== Composition ==
Plant cuticles are composed primarily of the insoluble lipid polymers cutin and cutan, as well as soluble waxes. Cutin, a polyester polymer composed of inter-esterified omega hydroxy acids which are cross-linked by ester and epoxide bonds, is the best-known structural component of the cuticular membrane. The cuticle can also contain a non-saponifiable hydrocarbon polymer known as cutan.

The cuticular membrane also contains waxes, which are the main mechanism for conferring water resistance in the plant cuticle. These epicuticular waxes are mixtures of hydrophobic aliphatic compounds, hydrocarbons with chain lengths typically in the range C16 to C36.

== Cuticular wax biosynthesis ==
Cuticular wax is known to be largely composed of compounds which derive from very-long-chain fatty acids (VLCFAs), such as aldehydes, alcohols, alkanes, ketones, and esters. Also present are other compounds in cuticular wax which are not VLCFA derivatives, such as terpenoids, flavonoids, and sterols, and thus have different synthetic pathways than those VLCFAs.

The first step of the biosynthesis pathway for the formation of cuticular VLCFAs, occurs with the de novo biosynthesis of C16 acyl chains (palmitate) by chloroplasts in the mesophyll, and concludes with the extension of these chains in the endoplasmic reticulum of epidermal cells. An important catalyzer thought to be in this process is the fatty acid elongase (FAE) complex.

To form cuticular wax components, VLCFAs are modified through either two identified pathways, an acyl reduction pathway or a decarbonylation pathway. In the acyl reduction pathway, a reductase converts VLCFAs into primary alcohols, which can then be converted to wax esters through a wax synthase. In the decarbonylation pathway, aldehydes are produced and decarbonylated to form alkanes, and can be subsequently oxidized to form secondary alcohols and ketones. The wax biosynthesis pathway ends with the transportation of the wax components from the endoplasmic reticulum to the epidermal surface.

== Functions ==
The primary function of the plant cuticle is as a water permeability barrier that prevents evaporation of water from the epidermal surface, and also prevents external water and solutes from entering the tissues. In addition to its function as a permeability barrier for water and other molecules (prevent water loss), the micro and nano-structure of the cuticle have specialised surface properties that prevent contamination of plant tissues with external water, dirt and microorganisms. Aerial organs of many plants, such as the leaves of the sacred lotus (Nelumbo nucifera) have ultra-hydrophobic and self-cleaning properties that have been described by Barthlott and Neinhuis (1997). The lotus effect has applications in biomimetic technical materials.

Dehydration protection provided by a maternal cuticle improves offspring fitness in the moss Funaria hygrometrica and in the sporophytes of all vascular plants. In angiosperms the cuticle tends to be thicker on the top of the leaf (adaxial surface), but is not always thicker. The leaves of xerophytic plants adapted to drier climates have more equal cuticle thicknesses compared to those of mesophytic plants from wetter climates that do not have a high risk of dehydration.

"The waxy sheet of cuticle also functions in defense, forming a physical barrier that resists penetration by virus particles, bacterial cells, and the spores and growing filaments of fungi".

== Evolution ==
The plant cuticle is one of a series of innovations, together with stomata, xylem and phloem and intercellular spaces in stem and later leaf mesophyll tissue, that plants evolved more than 450 million years ago during the transition between life in water and life on land. Together, these features enabled upright plant shoots exploring aerial environments to conserve water by internalising the gas exchange surfaces, enclosing them in a waterproof membrane and providing a variable-aperture control mechanism, the stomatal guard cells, which regulate the rates of transpiration and CO_{2} exchange.
