= 3-Hydroxypropionic acid =

- Skeletal formula

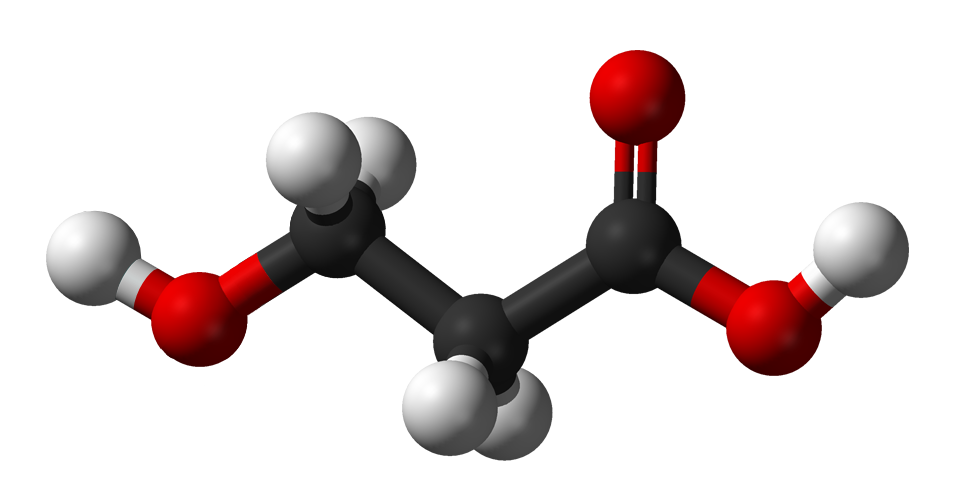
- Ball-and-stick model

Names
- Preferred IUPAC name 3-Hydroxypropanoic acid
- Other names 3-Hydroxypropionic acid Hydracrylic acid Ethylene lactic acid

Identifiers
CAS Number	503-66-2
3D model (JSmol)	Interactive image
Beilstein Reference	773806
ChEBI	CHEBI:33404
ChEMBL	ChEMBL1205969
ChemSpider	61460
DrugBank	DB03688
ECHA InfoCard	100.007.250
EC Number	207-974-8
KEGG	C01013
PubChem CID	68152
UNII	C4ZF6XLD2X
CompTox Dashboard (EPA)	DTXSID50198305
- InChI: InChI=1S/C3H6O3/c4-2-1-3(5)6/h4H,1-2H2,(H,5,6) Key: ALRHLSYJTWAHJZ-UHFFFAOYSA-N; InChI=1/C3H6O3/c4-2-1-3(5)6/h4H,1-2H2,(H,5,6) Key: ALRHLSYJTWAHJZ-UHFFFAOYAU
- SMILES: O=C(O)CCO

Properties
Chemical formula	C_{3}H_{6}O_{3}
Molar mass	90.078 g·mol^{−1}
Melting point	<25 °C; 143 °C (sodium salt)
Boiling point	Decomposes
Solubility in water	Very soluble
Acidity (pK_{a})	4.87

Related compounds
Related carboxylic acids	acetic acid glycolic acid propionic acid lactic acid malonic acid butyric acid hydroxybutyric acid
Related compounds	1-propanol 2-propanol propionaldehyde acrolein
- Except where otherwise noted, data are given for materials in their standard state (at 25 °C [77 °F], 100 kPa). verify (what is ?) Infobox references

3-Hydroxypropionic acid is a carboxylic acid, specifically a beta hydroxy acid. It is an acidic viscous liquid with a pKa of 4.9. It is very soluble in water, soluble in ethanol and diethyl ether. Upon distillation, it dehydrates to form acrylic acid, and is occasionally called hydracrylic acid.

3-Hydroxypropionic acid is used in the industrial production of various chemicals such as acrylates.

== Synthesis ==
3-Hydroxypropionic acid can be obtained by base-induced hydration of acrylic acid followed by reacidification. Another synthesis involves cyanation of ethylene chlorohydrin followed by hydrolysis of the resulting nitrile. Hydrolysis of propiolactone is yet another route. Propiolactone, the dehydrated derivative of 3-hydroxypropionic acid, is produced by reaction of ketene and formaldehyde.

3-Hydroxypropionic acid is listed as one of the "top" chemicals that could be produced from renewable resources. In particular, it could be produced by manipulation of glycerol, but this technology has not reached a commercial stage. It can also be produced from glucose via pyruvate and malonyl coenzyme A.

== Potential applications ==
3-Hydroxypropionic acid is of interest as a bio-derived precursor to acrylic acid.

The polyester poly(3-hydroxypropionic acid) is a biodegradable polymer. The method combines the high-molecular weight and control aspects of ring-opening polymerization with the commercial availability of the beta hydroxy acid, 3-hydroxypropionic acid which is abbreviated as 3-HP. Since 3-HPA can be derived from biological sources, the resulting material, poly(3-hydroxypropionic acid) or P(3-HPA), is biorenewable.

== Genetically encoded 3-hydroxypropionic acid inducible system ==
3-Hydroxypropionic acid can be produced by engineered microbes.

A genetically encoded 3-hydroxypropionic acid inducible system has been characterized in bacteria demonstrating that such system in combination with fluorescent reporter protein can be utilized as a biosensor to measure intracellular and extracellular 3-HP concentrations by fluorescence output.

== See also ==
- Lactic acid (2-hydroxypropanoic acid)
- 3-Hydroxypropionate bicycle
- listed as hydracrylic acid in the Merck index, 12th Edition
