= Beta hydroxycarboxylic acid =

Class of chemical compounds

3-Hydroxypropionic acid, a simple beta hydroxy acid

A beta hydroxy carboxylic acid or β-hydroxy carboxylic acid (BHA) is a carboxylic acid containing a hydroxy functional group separated by two carbon atoms. They are related to alpha hydroxy acids, in which the two functional groups are separated by only one carbon atom.

== Reactions ==
Upon dehydration, beta-hydroxy acids yield an alpha-beta unsaturated acid.

Compared to their non-hydroxylated counterpart, beta hydroxy carboxylic acids are stronger, although weaker than the alpha hydroxy acids. Due to the larger distance, the intramolecular hydrogen bridge is less easily formed compared to the alpha hydroxy acids. The table summarizes some values on the propionic series.

| Name | pK_{a} |
|---|---|
| Propanoic acid | 4.87 |
| α-Hydroxypropionic acid | 3.86 |
| β-Hydroxypropionic acid | 4.51 |

== Occurrence and inventory ==
Aldonic acids, a type of sugar acid, are a class of naturally occurring β-hydroxycarboxylic acids. They have the general chemical formula HO_{2}C(CHOH)_{n}CH_{2}OH. Gluconic acid, a particularly common aldonic acid, the oxidized derivative of glucose.

Other beta hydroxy acids include:

- β-Hydroxybutyric acid
- 3-Hydroxypentanoic acid
- 3-Hydroxyoctanoic acid
- 3-Hydroxydecanoic acid
- β-Hydroxy β-methylbutyric acid
- Carnitine
- Salicylic acid, a β-hydroxy acid. In cosmetics, the term beta hydroxy acid refers specifically to salicylic acid, which is used in some "anti-aging" creams and acne treatments. It is used to combat inflammation.

== See also ==
- Alpha hydroxy acid
- Omega hydroxy acid
