= Palmitic acid =

16-Carbon fatty acid

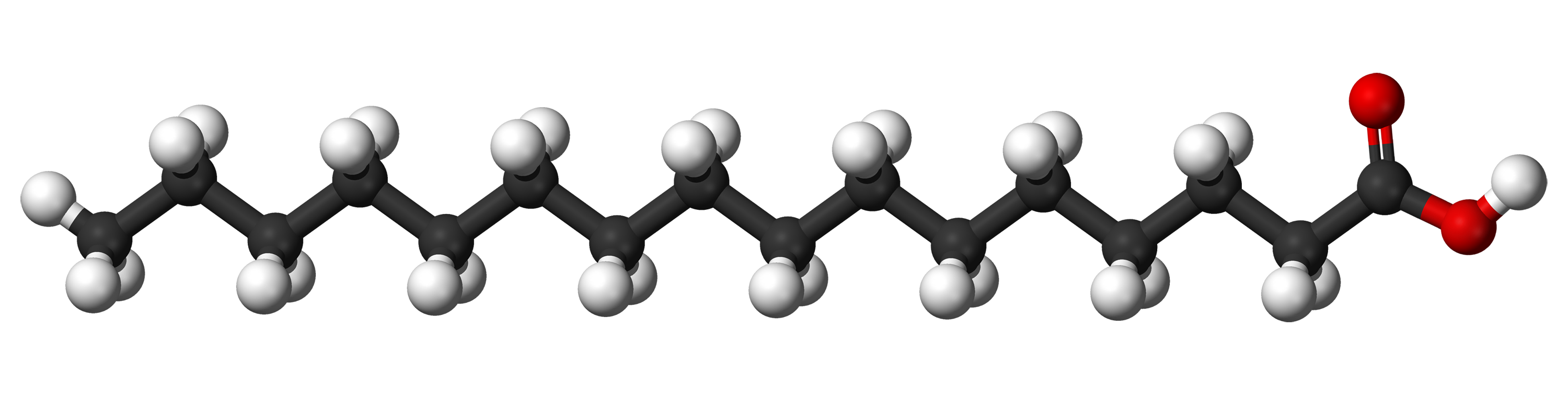

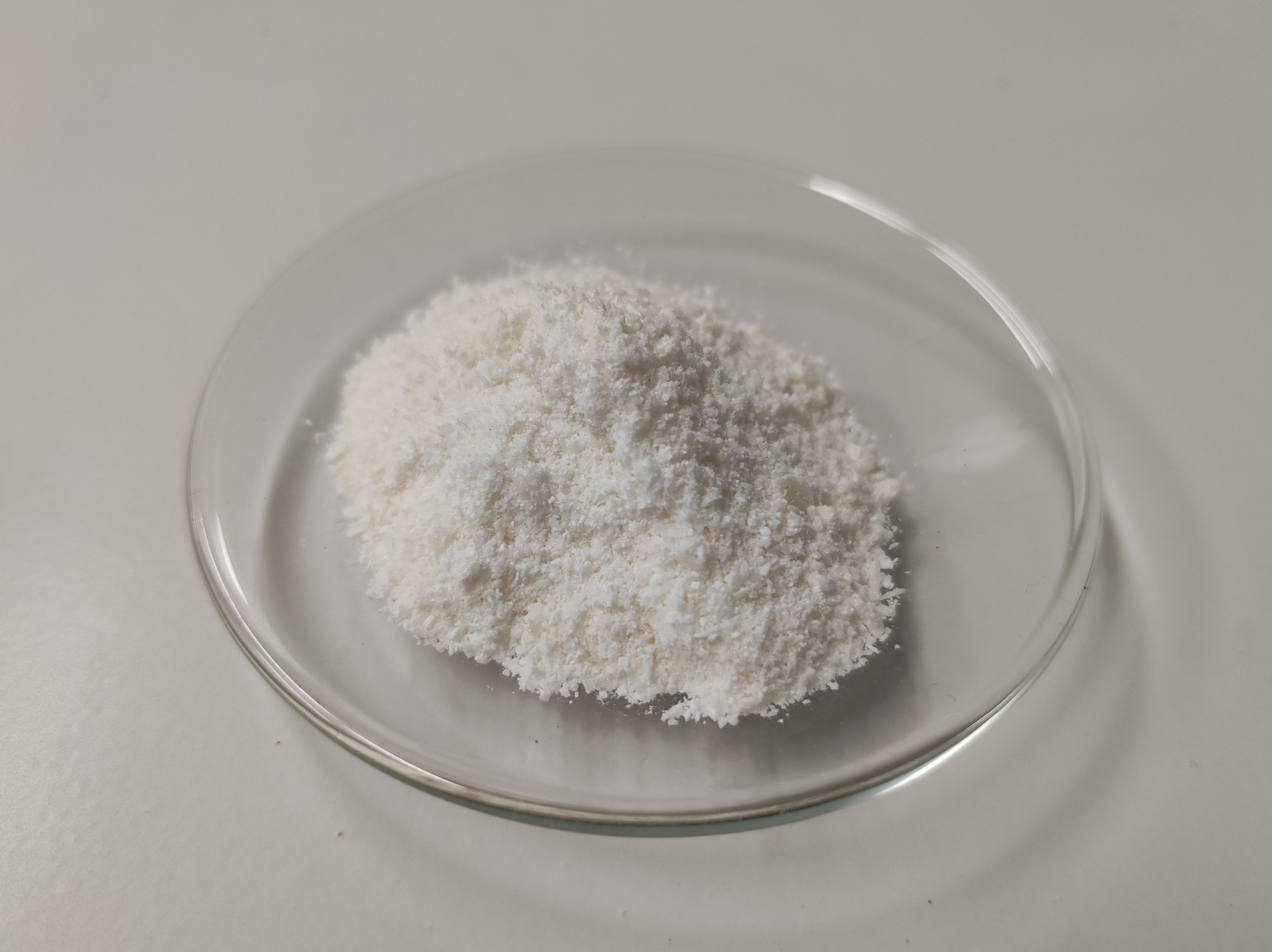

Names
- Preferred IUPAC name Hexadecanoic acid
- Other names Palmitic acid C16:0 (Lipid numbers)

Identifiers
CAS Number	57-10-3
3D model (JSmol)	Interactive image
ChEMBL	ChEMBL82293
ChemSpider	960
ECHA InfoCard	100.000.284
IUPHAR/BPS	1055
PubChem CID	985
UNII	2V16EO95H1
CompTox Dashboard (EPA)	DTXSID2021602
- InChI: InChI=1S/C16H32O2/c1-2-3-4-5-6-7-8-9-10-11-12-13-14-15-16(17)18/h2-15H2,1H3,(H,17,18) Key: IPCSVZSSVZVIGE-UHFFFAOYSA-N; InChI=1/C16H32O2/c1-2-3-4-5-6-7-8-9-10-11-12-13-14-15-16(17)18/h2-15H2,1H3,(H,17,18) Key: IPCSVZSSVZVIGE-UHFFFAOYAJ
- SMILES: CCCCCCCCCCCCCCCC(=O)O

Properties
Chemical formula	C_{16}H_{32}O_{2}
Molar mass	256.430 g·mol^{−1}
Appearance	White crystals
Density	0.852 g/cm^{3} (25 °C); 0.8527 g/cm^{3} (62 °C)
Melting point	62.9 °C (145.2 °F; 336.0 K)
Boiling point	351–352 °C (664–666 °F; 624–625 K); 271.5 °C (520.7 °F; 544.6 K), 100 mmHg; 215 °C (419 °F; 488 K), 15 mmHg
Solubility in water	4.6 mg/L (0 °C); 7.2 mg/L (20 °C); 8.3 mg/L (30 °C); 10 mg/L (45 °C); 12 mg/L (60 °C)
Solubility	Soluble in amyl acetate, alcohol, CCl_{4}, C_{6}H_{6} Very soluble in CHCl_{3}
Solubility in ethanol	2 g/100 mL (0 °C); 2.8 g/100 mL (10 °C); 9.2 g/100 mL (20 °C); 31.9 g/100 mL (40 °C)
Solubility in methyl acetate	7.81 g/100 g
Solubility in ethyl acetate	10.7 g/100 g
Vapor pressure	0.051 mPa (25 °C); 1.08 kPa (200 °C); 28.06 kPa (300 °C)
Acidity (pK_{a})	4.75
Magnetic susceptibility (χ)	−198.6·10^{−6} cm^{3}/mol
Refractive index (n_{D})	1.43 (70 °C)
Viscosity	7.8 cP (70 °C)

Thermochemistry
Heat capacity (C)	463.36 J/(mol·K)
Std molar entropy (S^{⦵}_{298})	452.37 J/(mol·K)
Std enthalpy of formation (Δ_{f}H^{⦵}_{298})	−892 kJ/mol
Std enthalpy of combustion (Δ_{c}H^{⦵}_{298})	10030.6 kJ/mol

Hazards
- GHS labelling
Pictograms	(GHS07: Exclamation mark)
Signal word	Warning
Hazard statements	H319
Precautionary statements	P305+P351+P338
NFPA 704 (fire diamond)	1 1 0
Flash point	206 °C (403 °F; 479 K)
- Except where otherwise noted, data are given for materials in their standard state (at 25 °C [77 °F], 100 kPa). verify (what is ?) Infobox references

Palmitic acid (hexadecanoic acid in IUPAC nomenclature) is a fatty acid with a 16-carbon chain. It is the most common saturated fatty acid found in animals, plants and microorganisms. Its chemical formula is CH_{3}(CH_{2})_{14}COOH, and its C:D ratio (the total number of carbon atoms to the number of carbon-carbon double bonds) is 16:0. It is a major component of palm oil from the fruit of Elaeis guineensis (oil palms), making up to 44% of total fats. Meats, cheeses, butter, and other dairy products also contain palmitic acid, amounting to 50–60% of total fats.

Palmitates are the salts and esters of palmitic acid. The palmitate anion is the observed form of palmitic acid at physiologic pH (7.4). Major sources of C16:0 are palm oil, palm kernel oil, coconut oil, and milk fat.

Dietary palmitic acid intake is associated with an increased cardiovascular disease risk through raising low-density lipoprotein.

== Occurrence and production ==
Palmitic acid was discovered by saponification of palm oil, which process remains today the primary industrial route for producing the acid. Triglycerides (fats) in palm oil are hydrolysed by high-temperature water and the resulting mixture is fractionally distilled.

=== Dietary sources ===
Palmitic acid is produced by a wide range of plants and organisms, typically at low levels. Among common foods it is present in milk, butter, cheese, and some meats, as well as cocoa butter, olive oil, soybean oil, and sunflower oil, (see table). Karukas contain 44.90% palmitic acid. The cetyl ester of palmitic acid, cetyl palmitate, occurs in spermaceti.

Palmitic acid content of common foods
Food	% of total calories
Palm oil	45.1%
Beef tallow	26.5%
Butter fat	26.2%
Cocoa butter	25.8%
Lard	24.8%
Cottonseed oil	24.7%
Chicken	23.2%
Corn oil	12.2%
Peanut oil	11.6%
Soybean oil	11%
Coconut oil	8.4%
Palm kernel oil	8%
Rapeseed oil	3.6%

== Biochemistry ==
Palmitic acid is the first fatty acid produced during fatty acid synthesis and is the precursor to longer fatty acids. As a consequence, palmitic acid is a major body component of animals. In humans, one analysis found it to make up 21–30% (molar) of human depot fat, and it is a major, but highly variable, lipid component of human breast milk. Palmitic acid comprises nearly half of total human brain saturated fatty acids.

Palmitate negatively feeds back on acetyl-CoA carboxylase (ACC), which is responsible for converting acetyl-CoA to malonyl-CoA, which in turn is used to add to the growing acyl chain, thus preventing further palmitate generation. Some proteins are modified by the addition of a palmitoyl group in a process known as palmitoylation. Palmitoylation is important for localisation of many membrane proteins.

== Applications ==
=== Surfactant ===
Palmitic acid is used to produce soaps, cosmetics, and industrial mold release agents. These applications use sodium palmitate, which is commonly obtained by saponification of palm oil. To this end, palm oil, rendered from palm trees (species Elaeis guineensis), is treated with sodium hydroxide (in the form of caustic soda or lye), which causes hydrolysis of the ester groups, yielding glycerol and sodium palmitate.

=== Foods ===
Because it is inexpensive and adds texture and "mouthfeel" to processed foods (convenience food), palmitic acid and its sodium salt find wide use in foodstuffs. Sodium palmitate is permitted as a natural additive in organic products.

=== Military ===
Aluminium salts of palmitic acid and naphthenic acid were the gelling agents used with volatile petrochemicals during World War II to produce napalm. The word "napalm" is derived from the words naphthenic acid and palmitic acid.

== Research ==
It is well accepted in the medical community that palmitic acid from dietary sources raises low-density lipoprotein (LDL) and total cholesterol. The World Health Organization has stated there is convincing evidence that palmitic acid increases cardiovascular disease risk. Palmitic acid intake is associated with an increased cancer risk, including prostate cancer.

A 2021 review indicated that replacing dietary palmitic acid and other saturated fatty acids with unsaturated fatty acids, such as oleic acid, could reduce several biomarkers of cardiovascular and metabolic diseases.

== See also ==
- Retinyl palmitate
- Ascorbyl palmitate
- SN2 Palmitate
- Juniperic acid (16-hydroxypalmitic acid)
