= Cutin =

Lipid polyester polymer in the cuticle of plants

Scheme of biosynthesis of cutin and lignin

Cutin is one of two waxy polymers that are the main components of the plant cuticle, which covers all aerial surfaces of plants, the other being cutan. It is an insoluble substance with waterproof quality. Cutin also harbors cuticular waxes, which assist in cuticle structure. Cutan, the other major cuticle polymer, is much more readily preserved in fossil records. Cutin consists of omega hydroxy acids and their derivatives, which are interlinked via ester bonds, forming a polyester polymer of indeterminate size.

There are two major monomer families of cutin, the C16 and C18 families. The C16 family consists mainly of 16-hydroxy palmitic acid and 9,16- or 10,16-dihydroxypalmitic acid. The C18 family consists mainly of 18-hydroxy oleic acid, 9,10-epoxy-18-hydroxy stearic acid, and 9,10,18-trihydroxystearate.
