= Hexuronic acid =

Hexuronic acid is any uronic acid derived from a hexose. These include fructuronic acids, galacturonic acids, glucuronic acids, guluronic acids, iduronic acids, mannuronic acids, and tagaturonic acids.

In the early 1900s, ascorbic acid (vitamin C) was also known as hexuronic acid. This is no longer the case.
