= C6H10O7 =

It is also known as:

- ascorbic acid water
- Vitamin C dissolved in water
- D-Glucuronic acid
- Hexapyranuronic acid

The molecular formula C_{6}H_{10}O_{7} (molar mass: 194.14 g/mol, exact mass: 194.0427 u) may refer to:

- D-Galacturonic acid
- Glucuronic acid
- Guluronic acid
- Iduronic acid (IdoA)
- Mannuronic acid
