= Ulvan lyase =

Enzyme

Identifiers
- EC no.: 4.2.2.-

Databases
- BRENDA: enzyme data
- ExPASy: NiceZyme view
- KEGG: enzyme entry
- MetaCyc: metabolic pathway
- Rhea: reactions
- PDB structures: RCSB PDB PDBe PDBsum
Search
- PMC: articles
- PubMed: articles
- NCBI: proteins

Ulvan lyase (EC 4.2.2.-) is an enzyme found within the cell-wall of the marine organisms of the genus Ulva (algae), and some marine bacteria. A lyase is a class of enzyme that catalyzes the breakdown of chemical bonds through an elimination reaction mechanism, rather than a substitution reaction mechanism (hydrolysis and oxidation). Ulvan lyase belongs to the polysaccharide lyase family, a type of enzyme that primarily functions to cleave glycosidic linkages in polysaccharides.

== Classification ==
Enzymes are categorized according to the Enzyme Commission Number (EC number), which uses a numerical catalog system to compile a list of known enzymes and their relative substrates. Many enzymes often catalyze reactions within multiple organisms, resulting in an EC number that represents the shared enzyme-catalyzed reaction within varying species. For example, ulvan lyase shares an EC number with other lyase-catalyzed reactions (that act on polysaccharides) that occur in organisms unrelated to Ulva. The term "ulvan", refers to the anionic polysaccharide substrate that the enzyme lyase acts upon within the cell-wall structure. Ulvan lyase has a partial EC number, which is represented with a dash symbol at the last digit. Partial EC numbers indicate either a novel enzyme that has yet to receive a full EC number, or different enzymes that catalyze multiple reactions within the same class. The first four digits in an enzyme's EC number are used to form a numerical ID for the enzyme, describing its function and mechanism. The first digit of ulvan lyase's EC number (4) indicates that it belongs to the main class of lyases. The second digit (2), or subclass, indicates that it cleaves carbon-oxygen bonds. Finally, the third digit (2), or sub-subclass, indicates that it acts on polysaccharides. Ulvan lyase does not contain a fourth digit (serial number), hence its partial EC number.

== Reaction mechanism ==
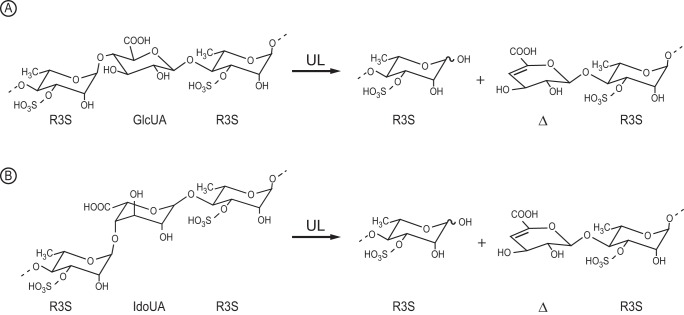
Ulvan lyase cleavage of β-(1,4) glycosidic bond between the two uronic acids found in ulvan (GlcUA and IdoUA)

Ulvan lyase degrades ulvan by catalyzing the endolytic cleavage of the glycosidic linkages in glycosides. Specifically, the enzyme cleaves the glycosidic bond between uronic acid or iduronic acid and 3-sulfated rhamnose (R3S) through a β-elimination (E2) reaction. There are two forms of uronic acid involved in the glycosidic cleavage: D-glucuronic acid (GlcUA) and its epimer L-iduronic acid (IdoUA). At the site of cleavage, a β (1,4) glycosidic bond is broken, depolymerizing ulvan. The proton located on carbon 5 (C5) is abstracted with a hydroxyl group on carbon 4 (C4), resulting in a product that contains a reducing end on one fragment, and an unsaturated uronic acid (Δ, 4-deoxy-L-threohex-4-enopyranosiduronic acid) on the non-reducing end.

== Structure ==
Ulvan lyases typically have a molecular weight between 30-60 kDa. Ulvan's backbone consists of repeating units of D-glucuronic acid and 3-sulfated rhamnose, with long side chains throughout. The ulvan polysaccharides consist of disaccharide moieties containing a 3-sulfated rhamnose backbone which forms the glycosidic linkage with glucuronic or iduronic acid. Mass spectrometry sequencing followed by polymerase chain reaction amplification determined that a complete ulvan lyase gene contains ≈1536 base pairs and ≈512 amino acids (after translation). Half of the sequenced peptides from an ulvan lyase gene (30 kDa) were isolated in the N-terminus of the peptide, with an average length of 25 amino acids. The enzyme's structure consists of a seven-bladed β-propeller that employs His/Tyr elimination to induce catalysis.

The N-terminus domain includes the catalytically active portion of the enzyme, while the C-terminus domain has a specificity for binding to ulvan, making it the substrate-binding domain. The binding domain preferentially binds ulvan, but does not bind to other polymers. The enzyme strongly adheres to the substrate, allowing lyase to act on ulvan while still embedded in the cell-wall. Within the N-terminus, a cleft lining the inner β-sheet houses the active site. The specific catalytic residues found in this region are Arg^{117}, Gln^{160}, Tyr^{281}, and Lys^{162}.

== Function ==
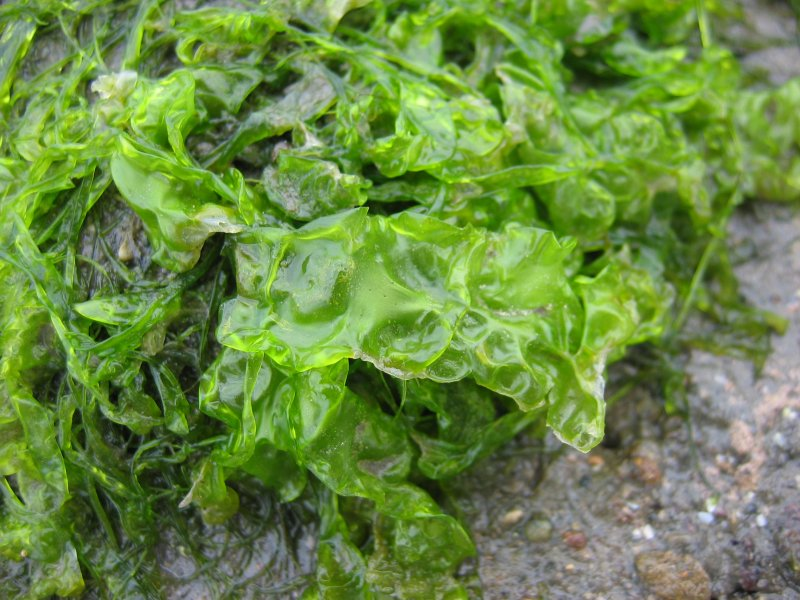
Ulva

In organisms of the genus Ulva, ulvan lyase functions to degrade the polysaccharide ulvan into oligosaccharides. Ulvan is one of the main components of Ulva's cell-wall, providing structural support and rigidity. Enzymatically, the predominant function of ulvan lyase is its ability to form ulvan oligosaccharides via degradation, which are more water-soluble and smaller in molecular weight, allowing for increased physiological capabilities. The oligosaccharides are then further broken down into monosaccharides. These smaller units are able to regulate cell-signalling within Ulva, which directly influence macro-algae metabolism, a system that relies on the degradation of organic compounds as an energy source. Without ulvan lyase, marine algae like Ulva would not be able to catalyze the breakdown of ulvan into monosaccharides, a prerequisite for the conversion of carbohydrates to energy through the central sugar metabolism.

=== Physiological function ===
Ulvan is one of the most abundant polysaccharides found in the cell-wall of marine algae. As a sulfated polysaccharide, ulvan's abundance in marine algae is considered to be the result of organismal adaptation to ionic environments like the ocean. Ulvan is able to regulate ionic balance within the cell-wall, exhibiting an osmotic function that prevents algae desiccation, a detrimental process that algae is highly susceptible to because of its hygroscopic structure. The acidic backbone of ulvan consisting of D-glucuronic and L-iduronic acid suggests that this polysaccharide contributes to cell-wall cohesion. Ulvan also exhibits a protective function by facilitating the inhibition of cellulase activity, which protects cellulose against marine bacterial attack in the cell wall.
