= Sugar acid =

Sugar molecule with an –OH group at the end(s) of the carbon chain

In organic chemistry, a sugar acid or acidic sugar is a monosaccharide with a carboxyl group at one end or both ends of its chain.

Main classes of sugar acids include:

- Aldonic acids, in which the aldehyde group (−CH=O) located at the initial end (position 1) of an aldose is oxidized.
- Ulosonic acids, in which the hydroxymethyl group (−CH_{2}OH) at the initial end of a 2-ketose is oxidized creating an α-ketoacid.
- Uronic acids, in which the −CH_{2}OH group at the terminal end of an aldose or ketose is oxidized.
- Aldaric acids, in which both ends (−CH=O and −CH_{2}OH) of an aldose are oxidized.

Aldonic acid

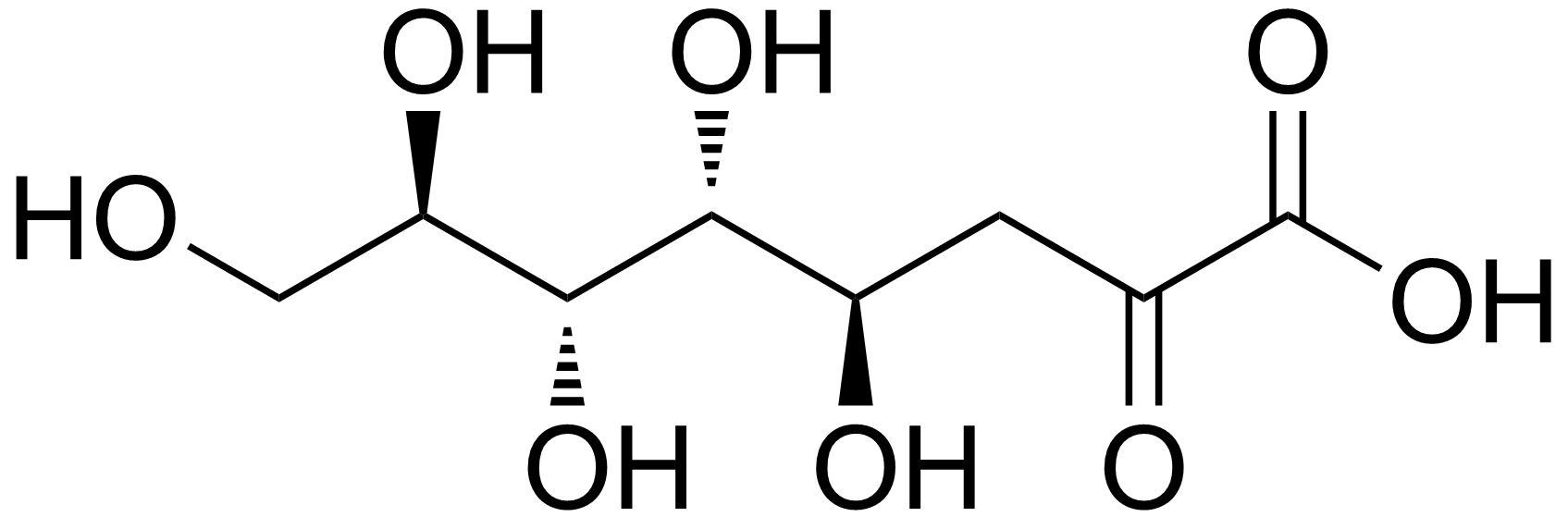
An ulosonic acid; specifically, 3-Deoxy-D-manno-oct-2-ulosonic acid

Uronic acid

Aldaric acid

== Examples ==
Examples of sugar acids include:

- Aldonic acids
  - Glyceric acid (3C)
  - Xylonic acid (5C)
  - Gluconic acid (6C)
  - Ascorbic acid (6C, unsaturated lactone)
- Ulosonic acids
  - Neuraminic acid (5-amino-3,5-dideoxy-D-glycero-D-galacto-non-2-ulosonic acid)
  - Ketodeoxyoctulosonic acid (KDO or 3-deoxy-D-manno-oct-2-ulosonic acid)
- Uronic acids
  - Glucuronic acid (6C)
  - Galacturonic acid (6C)
  - Iduronic acid (6C)
- Aldaric acids
  - Tartaric acid (4C)
  - meso-Galactaric acid (Mucic acid) (6C)
  - D-Glucaric acid (Saccharic acid) (6C)

Ascorbic acid (Vitamin C)

The β-D form of glucuronic acid
