= Guluronic acid =

Uronic acid monosaccharide derived from gulose

- α-l-gulopyranuronic acid

Names
- IUPAC name α-l-gulopyranuronic acid
- Other names Gulopyranuronic acid, GulA

Identifiers
| CAS Number | open form: 1986-15-8 |
| 3D model (JSmol) | open form: Interactive image |
| ChEBI | open form: CHEBI:28378 |
| ChemSpider | open form: 76753 |
| PubChem CID | open form: 6857369 |
| UNII | open form: 58QGW9MR67 |
| CompTox Dashboard (EPA) | open form: DTXSID90331557 |
- InChI: open form: InChI=1S/C6H10O7/c7-1-2(8)3(9)4(10)5(11)6(12)13/h1-5,8-11H,(H,12,13)/t2-,3-,4+,5-/m1/s1 Key: IAJILQKETJEXLJ-SQOUGZDYSA-N
- SMILES: open form: C(=O)[C@H]([C@H]([C@@H]([C@H](C(=O)O)O)O)O)O

Properties
| Chemical formula | C_{6}H_{10}O_{7} |
| Molar mass | 194.139 g·mol^{−1} |

Related compounds
| Related uronic acids | Alluronic acid, Altruronic acid, Arabinuronic acid, Fructuronic acid, Galacturonic acid, Glucuronic acid, Iduronic acid, Lyxuronic acid, Mannuronic acid, Psicuronic acid, Riburonic acid, Ribuluronic acid, Sorburonic acid, Tagaturonic acid, Taluronic acid, Xyluluronic acid, Xyluronic acid |
- Except where otherwise noted, data are given for materials in their standard state (at 25 °C [77 °F], 100 kPa). Infobox references

Guluronic acid is a uronic acid monosaccharide that may be derived from gulose. l-Guluronic acid is a C-3 epimer of l-galacturonic acid and a C-5 epimer of d-mannuronic acid. Along with d-mannuronic acid, l-guluronic acid is a component of alginic acid, a polysaccharide found in brown algae. α-L-Guluronic acid has been found to bind divalent metal ions (such as calcium and strontium) through the carboxylate moiety and through the axial-equatorial-axial arrangement of hydroxyl groups found around the ring.
