= C6H10O8 =

The molecular formula C_{6}H_{10}O_{8} (molar mass: 210.14 g/mol) may refer to:

- Saccharic acid, or glucaric acid
- Mucic acid, also known as galactaric acid or meso-galactaric acid
