= Ascorbate 2,3-dioxygenase =

Obsolete enzyme family

ascorbate 2,3-dioxygenase

Identifiers
- EC no.: 1.13.11.13
- CAS no.: 37256-55-6

Databases
- IntEnz: IntEnz view
- BRENDA: BRENDA entry
- ExPASy: NiceZyme view
- KEGG: KEGG entry
- MetaCyc: metabolic pathway
- PRIAM: profile
- PDB structures: RCSB PDB PDBe PDBsum
- Gene Ontology: AmiGO / QuickGO
Search
- PMC: articles
- PubMed: articles
- NCBI: proteins

Ascorbate 2,3-dioxygenase (EC 1.13.11.13) is an enzyme that catalyzes the chemical reaction

ascorbate + O_{2} + H_{2}O $\rightleftharpoons$ oxalate + threonate

The 3 substrates of this enzyme are ascorbate, oxygen, and water, whereas its two products are oxalate and threonate.

This enzyme belongs to the family of oxidoreductases, specifically those acting on single donors with O_{2} as oxidant and incorporation of two atoms of oxygen into the substrate (oxygenases). The oxygen incorporated need not be derived from O_{2}. The systematic name of this enzyme class is ascorbate:oxygen 2,3-oxidoreductase (bond-cleaving). This enzyme is also called AAoxygenase. This enzyme participates in ascorbate and aldarate metabolism. It employs one cofactor, iron.
