= Charles Glen King =

American biochemist (1896–1988)

- Charles Glen King
- Born: October 22, 1896; Entiat, Washington, U.S.
- Died: January 23, 1988 (aged 91); West Chester, Pennsylvania, U.S.
- Education: Washington State University (BS); University of Pittsburgh (MS, PhD)
- Known for: Nutritional research, discovery of Vitamin C
- Awards: John Scott Award; Nicholas Appert Award (1955)
- Scientific career
- Fields: Biochemist
- Workplaces: University of Pittsburgh, Columbia University

Charles Glen King (October 22, 1896 – January 23, 1988) was an American biochemist who was a pioneer in the field of nutrition research and who isolated vitamin C at the same time as Albert Szent-Györgyi. A biography of King states that many feel he deserves equal credit with Szent-Györgyi for the discovery of this vitamin.

== Early life and education ==
King was born in Entiat, Washington on October 22, 1896 to Charles Clement King and Mary Jane Bookwalter. He entered Washington State University, then Washington State College, early, as his local one-room school did not have a twelfth grade. He initially studied geology and then switched to chemistry, and while studying he became a president of his undergraduate fraternity Lambda Chi Alpha.

World War I interrupted his college studies, where he served in the 12th Infantry Regiment, a heavy machine gun company. He did not receive his B.S. in chemistry until 1918.

After graduation from Washington State College, King immediately departed for the University of Pittsburgh, earning his M.S. in chemistry in 1920 and a Ph.D. in organic chemistry in 1923. From the outset of his graduate studies, the nascent field of vitamins interested him.

== Career ==
King remained in Pittsburgh as a professor until 1942 when he left to become the first scientific director of the Nutrition Foundation in New York City, which worked to promote scientific and public health research, both in the U.S. and internationally.

King's contribution to the science of nutrition revolves around his isolation of vitamin C in 1931-1932 by studying the antiscorbic activities of guinea pigs with preparations from lemon juice. Albert Szent-Györgyi was conducting similar research at the University of Szeged in Hungary, focusing on hexuronic acid. The chemical identity of King's active substance was almost identical to Szent-Györgyi's hexuronic acid, but the research of S.S. Silva had declared the hexuronic acid was not vitamin C. However, within two weeks of each other in the spring of 1932, King first, and then Szent-Györgyi, published articles declaring that vitamin C and hexuronic acid were indeed the same compound. Szent-Györgyi would later win a Nobel Prize for his part in the discovery, and controversy remains over whether both men deserve equal credit. King later established the important functional role of vitamin B, and throughout his 40-year research career made many significant contributions in the areas of fats, enzymes and vitamins. King authored over 200 articles on good nutritional practices and the positive effects of vitamins.

In New York, with his primary work at the Nutrition Foundation, King became a visiting professor at Columbia University 1942–1946 and a full professor of chemistry there in 1946–1962. During this time he established the Nutrition Foundation's journal, Nutrition Reviews. He was elected to the National Academy of Sciences in 1951.

In addition to his work with the Nutrition Foundation, King's public service activities involved creation of the USDA's Plant, Soil, and Nutrition Laboratory in Ithaca, New York. He helped establish the Food and Nutrition Board, dealing with food and nutrition problems in military and civilian populations, beginning in World War II and continuing through 1970. He also helped create the Food Protection Committee, the Recommended Dietary Allowances, the Protein Advisory Group, and the International Union of Nutritional Sciences. He became president of the International Union of Nutritional Sciences in 1960. He also served on the advisory council to the National Institute of Arthritis and Metabolic Diseases. King officially retired from the Nutrition Foundation in 1963, only to begin a second career as associate director of the Columbia University's Institute of Nutrition Sciences and a consultant to the Rockefeller Foundation.

== Personal life and death ==
King married Hilda Bainton in 1919 after his Army service. They had three children during his time in Pittsburgh. In personal life, he was remembered for his rose gardening and his religious service. In Pittsburgh, he attended the First Baptist Church of Pittsburgh and served on its board of directors; in New York, he attended the Riverside Church as member, deacon, and trustee; after retirement, he joined the Quakers.

King died on January 23, 1988.
