= Gluconate 2-dehydrogenase (acceptor) =

Identifiers
- EC no.: 1.1.99.3
- CAS no.: 9028-81-3

Databases
- BRENDA: enzyme data
- ExPASy: NiceZyme view
- KEGG: enzyme entry
- MetaCyc: metabolic pathway
- Rhea: reactions
- PDB structures: RCSB PDB PDBe PDBsum
Search
- PMC: articles
- PubMed: articles
- NCBI: proteins

In enzymology, a gluconate 2-dehydrogenase (acceptor) (EC 1.1.99.3) is an enzyme that catalyzes the chemical reaction

D-gluconic acid
+ electron acceptor
2-dehydro-D-gluconic acid
+ reduced acceptor

The two substrates of this enzyme are D-gluconic acid and an electron acceptor. Its products are 2-dehydro-D-gluconic acid and the corresponding reduced acceptor.

This enzyme belongs to the family of oxidoreductases, specifically those acting on the CH-OH group of donor with other acceptors. The systematic name of this enzyme class is D-gluconate:acceptor 2-oxidoreductase. Other names in common use include gluconate oxidase, gluconate dehydrogenase, gluconic dehydrogenase, D-gluconate dehydrogenase, gluconic acid dehydrogenase, 2-ketogluconate reductase, D-gluconate dehydrogenase, 2-keto-D-gluconate-yielding, and D-gluconate:(acceptor) 2-oxidoreductase. This enzyme participates in pentose phosphate pathway. It employs one cofactor, FAD.
