= L-threonate 3-dehydrogenase =

Identifiers
- EC no.: 1.1.1.129
- CAS no.: 37250-59-2

Databases
- IntEnz: IntEnz view
- BRENDA: BRENDA entry
- ExPASy: NiceZyme view
- KEGG: KEGG entry
- MetaCyc: metabolic pathway
- PRIAM: profile
- PDB structures: RCSB PDB PDBe PDBsum
- Gene Ontology: AmiGO / QuickGO
Search
- PMC: articles
- PubMed: articles
- NCBI: proteins

In enzymology, L-threonate 3-dehydrogenase (EC 1.1.1.129) is an enzyme that catalyzes the chemical reaction

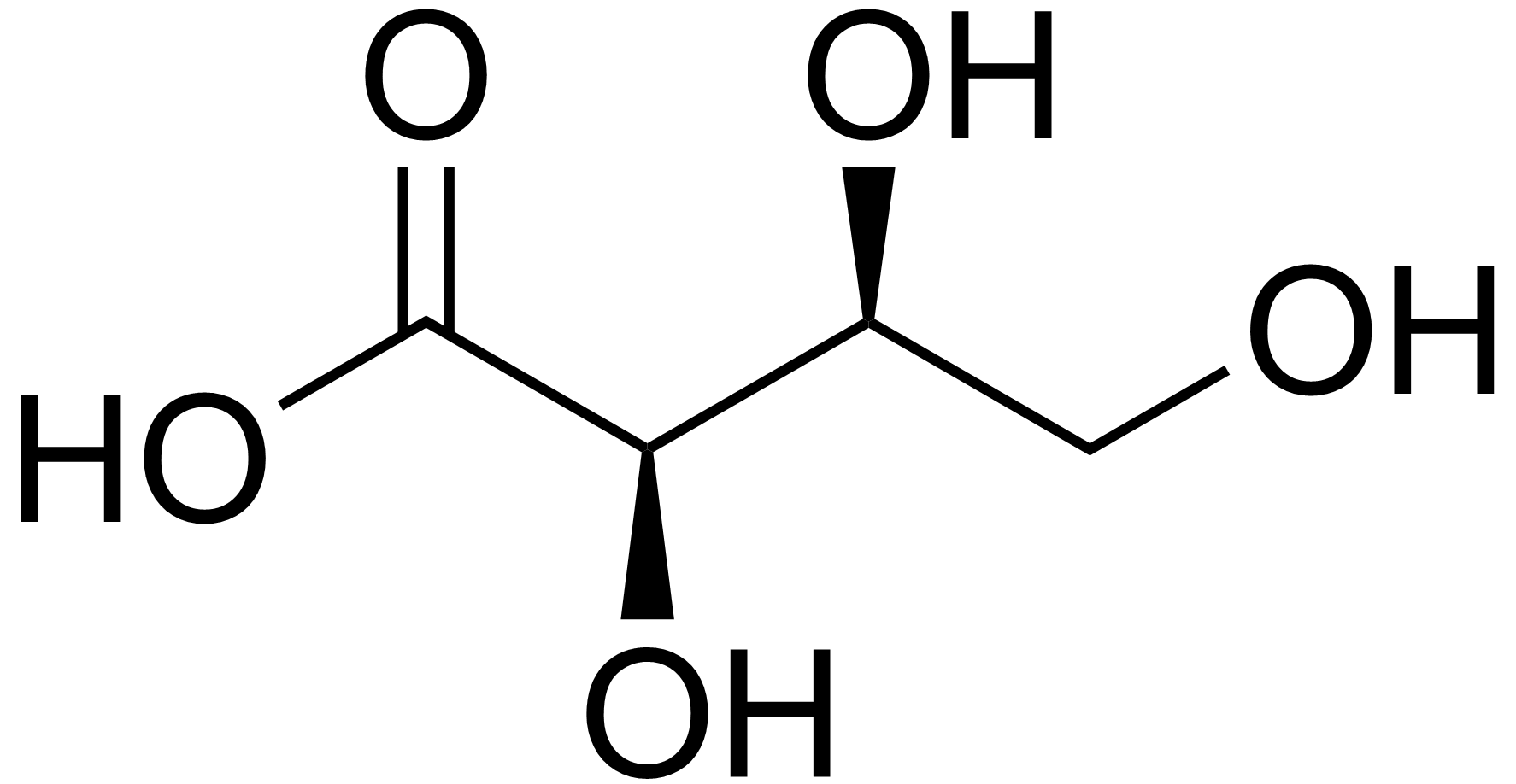
threonic acid
+ NAD^{+}
H^{+}
H^{+}
3-dehydro-L-threonic acid
+ NADH

The two substrates of this enzyme are threonic acid and oxidised nicotinamide adenine dinucleotide (NAD^{+}). Its products are 3-dehydro-L-threonic acid, reduced NADH, and a proton.

This enzyme belongs to the family of oxidoreductases, specifically those acting on the CH-OH group of donors with NAD^{+} or NADP^{+} as acceptor. The systematic name of this enzyme class is L-threonate:NAD^{+} 3-oxidoreductase. Other names in common use include threonate dehydrogenase, and L-threonic acid dehydrogenase. This enzyme participates in ascorbate and aldarate metabolism.
