= Mannuronic acid =

Sugar acid

- β-d-mannopyranuronic acid

Names
- IUPAC name β-d-mannopyranuronic acid
- Other names Mannopyranuronic acid, ManA

Identifiers
CAS Number	6906-37-2
3D model (JSmol)	Interactive image
ChEBI	CHEBI:79047
ChemSpider	73320
KEGG	C02024
PubChem CID	439630
- InChI: InChI=1S/C6H10O7/c7-1-2(8)4(5(10)11)13-6(12)3(1)9/h1-4,6-9,12H,(H,10,11)/t1-,2-,3-,4-,6?/m0/s1 Key: AEMOLEFTQBMNLQ-VANFPWTGSA-N
- SMILES: [C@@H]1([C@@H]([C@H](OC([C@H]1O)O)C(=O)O)O)O

Properties
Chemical formula	C_{6}H_{10}O_{7}
Molar mass	194.139 g·mol^{−1}

Related compounds
Related uronic acids	Alluronic acid, Altruronic acid, Arabinuronic acid, Fructuronic acid, Galacturonic acid, Glucuronic acid, Guluronic acid, Iduronic acid, Lyxuronic acid, Psicuronic acid, Riburonic acid, Ribuluronic acid, Sorburonic acid, Tagaturonic acid, Taluronic acid, Xyluluronic acid, Xyluronic acid
- Except where otherwise noted, data are given for materials in their standard state (at 25 °C [77 °F], 100 kPa). Infobox references

Mannuronic acid is a uronic acid monosaccharide that can be derived from mannose. Along with l-guluronic acid, d-mannuronic acid is a component of alginic acid, a polysaccharide found predominantly in brown algae. Mannuronic acid is also incorporated into some bacterial capsular polysaccharides.
