= Alginate synthase =

Class of enzymes

alginate synthase

Identifiers
- EC no.: 2.4.1.33
- CAS no.: 37257-31-1

Databases
- IntEnz: IntEnz view
- BRENDA: BRENDA entry
- ExPASy: NiceZyme view
- KEGG: KEGG entry
- MetaCyc: metabolic pathway
- PRIAM: profile
- PDB structures: RCSB PDB PDBe PDBsum
- Gene Ontology: AmiGO / QuickGO
Search
- PMC: articles
- PubMed: articles
- NCBI: proteins

In enzymology, an alginate synthase (EC 2.4.1.33) is an enzyme that catalyzes the chemical reaction

GDP-D-mannuronate + (alginate)n $\rightleftharpoons$ GDP + (alginate)n^{+}1

Thus, the two substrates of this enzyme are GDP-D-mannuronate and (alginate)n, whereas its two products are GDP and (alginate)n+1.

This enzyme belongs to the family of glycosyltransferases, specifically the hexosyltransferases. The systematic name of this enzyme class is GDP-D-mannuronate:alginate D-mannuronyltransferase. This enzyme is also called mannuronosyl transferase. This enzyme participates in fructose and mannose metabolism.
