= Gluconate 5-dehydrogenase =

Class of enzymes

gluconate 5-dehydrogenase

Identifiers
- EC no.: 1.1.1.69
- CAS no.: 9028-70-0

Databases
- IntEnz: IntEnz view
- BRENDA: BRENDA entry
- ExPASy: NiceZyme view
- KEGG: KEGG entry
- MetaCyc: metabolic pathway
- PRIAM: profile
- PDB structures: RCSB PDB PDBe PDBsum
- Gene Ontology: AmiGO / QuickGO
Search
- PMC: articles
- PubMed: articles
- NCBI: proteins

In enzymology, gluconate 5-dehydrogenase (EC 1.1.1.69) is an enzyme that catalyzes the chemical reaction

D-gluconic acid
+ NAD^{+}
H^{+}
H^{+}
5-oxo-D-gluconic acid
+ NADH

The two substrates of this enzyme are D-gluconic acid and oxidised nicotinamide adenine dinucleotide (NAD^{+}). Its products are 5-oxo-D-gluconic acid, reduced NADH, and a proton. The enzyme can use nicotinamide adenine dinucleotide phosphate as an alternative cofactor.

This enzyme belongs to the family of oxidoreductases, specifically those acting on the CH-OH group of donor with NAD^{+} or NADP^{+} as acceptor. The systematic name of this enzyme class is D-gluconate:NAD(P)^{+} 5-oxidoreductase. Other names in common use include 5-keto-D-gluconate 5-reductase, 5-keto-D-gluconate 5-reductase, 5-ketogluconate 5-reductase, 5-ketogluconate reductase, and 5-keto-D-gluconate reductase.

== Structural studies ==
As of late 2007, only one structure has been solved for this class of enzymes, with the PDB accession code 1VL8.
