= Sandie McCarthy =

New Zealand nursing academic

Alexandra Leigh McCarthy
- Other name: Sandie McCarthy
- Education: Queensland University of Technology
- Scientific career
- Fields: Rural nursing, cancer nursing
- Workplaces: Queensland University of Technology, Princess Alexandra Hospital, University of Auckland
- Thesis: A rebellious distemper : a Foucaultian history of breast cancer to 1900 (2005)

Alexandra Leigh McCarthy (known as Sandie) is a New Zealand nursing academic and as of September 2018 she was a full professor at the University of Auckland.

== Academic career ==
After a 2005 PhD titled 'A rebellious distemper : a Foucaultian history of breast cancer to 1900' at the Queensland University of Technology, she moved to the University of Auckland, rising to full professor. In early 2017 she was appointed head of the University School of Nursing.

== Selected works ==
- Hegney, Desley, Alexandra McCarthy, Cath Rogers‐Clark, and Don Gorman. "Why nurses are attracted to rural and remote practice." Australian Journal of Rural Health 10, no. 3 (2002): 178–186.
- Hegney, Desley, Alexandra McCarthy, Cath Rogers-Clark, and Don Gorman. "Retaining rural and remote area nurses: The Queensland, Australia experience." Journal of Nursing Administration 32, no. 3 (2002): 128–135.
- Hegney, Desley, and Alexandra McCarthy. "Job satisfaction and nurses in rural Australia." Journal of Nursing Administration 30, no. 7/8 (2000): 347–350.
- Hegney, Desley, Alan Pearson, and Alexandra McCarthy. The role and function of the rural nurse in Australia. Royal College of Nursing, Australia, 1997.
- Almutairi, Adel F., Glenn E. Gardner, and Alexandra McCarthy. "Practical guidance for the use of a pattern‐matching technique in case‐study research: A case presentation." Nursing & health sciences 16, no. 2 (2014): 239–244.
- Marx, Wolfgang M., Laisa Teleni, Alexandra L. McCarthy, Luis Vitetta, Dan McKavanagh, Damien Thomson, and Elisabeth Isenring. "Ginger (Zingiber officinale) and chemotherapy-induced nausea and vomiting: a systematic literature review." Nutrition Reviews 71, no. 4 (2013): 245–254.
