= Polymannuronate hydrolase =

Identifiers
- EC no.: 3.2.1.121
- CAS no.: 99283-64-4

Databases
- IntEnz: IntEnz view
- BRENDA: BRENDA entry
- ExPASy: NiceZyme view
- KEGG: KEGG entry
- MetaCyc: metabolic pathway
- PRIAM: profile
- PDB structures: RCSB PDB PDBe PDBsum
Search
- PMC: articles
- PubMed: articles
- NCBI: proteins

Polymannuronate hydrolase (EC 3.2.1.121, polymannuronic acid polymerase) is an enzyme with systematic name poly(mannuronide) mannuronohydrolase. It catalyses endohydrolysis of the D-mannuronide linkages of polymannuronate.

This enzyme does not act on alginic acid, which is a copolymer of polymannuronate.
