= L-galactonolactone oxidase =

Class of enzymes

Identifiers
- EC no.: 1.3.3.12
- CAS no.: 69403-13-0

Databases
- BRENDA: enzyme data
- ExPASy: NiceZyme view
- KEGG: enzyme entry
- MetaCyc: metabolic pathway
- Rhea: reactions
- PDB structures: RCSB PDB PDBe PDBsum
Search
- PMC: articles
- PubMed: articles
- NCBI: proteins

In enzymology, L-galactonolactone oxidase (EC 1.3.3.12) is an enzyme that catalyzes the chemical reaction

L-Galactono-1,4-lactone
O_{2}
H_{2}O_{2}
O_{2}
H_{2}O_{2}
Vitamin C

The two substrates of this enzyme are L-galactono-1,4-lactone and oxygen. Its products are L-ascorbic acid and hydrogen peroxide.

This enzyme belongs to the family of oxidoreductases, specifically those acting on the CH-CH group of donors with oxygen as acceptor. The systematic name of this enzyme class is L-galactono-1,4-lactone:oxygen 3-oxidoreductase. This enzyme is also called L-galactono-1,4-lactone oxidase. This enzyme participates in ascorbic acid and aldaric acid metabolism. It employs one cofactor, FAD.
