= Galactarate O-hydroxycinnamoyltransferase =

galactarate O-hydroxycinnamoyltransferase

Identifiers
- EC no.: 2.3.1.130
- CAS no.: 112956-50-0

Databases
- IntEnz: IntEnz view
- BRENDA: BRENDA entry
- ExPASy: NiceZyme view
- KEGG: KEGG entry
- MetaCyc: metabolic pathway
- PRIAM: profile
- PDB structures: RCSB PDB PDBe PDBsum
- Gene Ontology: AmiGO / QuickGO
Search
- PMC: articles
- PubMed: articles
- NCBI: proteins

In enzymology, a galactarate O-hydroxycinnamoyltransferase (EC 2.3.1.130) is an enzyme that catalyzes the chemical reaction

feruloyl-CoA + galactarate $\rightleftharpoons$ CoA + O-feruloylgalactarate

Thus, the two substrates of this enzyme are feruloyl-CoA and galactarate, whereas its two products are CoA and O-feruloylgalactarate.

This enzyme belongs to the family of transferases, specifically those acyltransferases transferring groups other than aminoacyl groups. The systematic name of this enzyme class is feruloyl-CoA:galactarate O-(hydroxycinnamoyl)transferase. This enzyme is also called galacturate hydroxycinnamoyltransferase.
