= C4H10O3 =

The molecular formula C_{4}H_{10}O_{3} (molar mass: 106.12 g/mol, exact mass: 106.0630 u) may refer to:

- 1,2,4-Butanetriol
- Diethyl ether peroxide
- Diethylene glycol (DEG)
- Trimethyl orthoformate (TMOF)
