= Gluconate 2-dehydrogenase =

gluconate 2-dehydrogenase

Identifiers
- EC no.: 1.1.1.215
- CAS no.: 68417-42-5

Databases
- IntEnz: IntEnz view
- BRENDA: BRENDA entry
- ExPASy: NiceZyme view
- KEGG: KEGG entry
- MetaCyc: metabolic pathway
- PRIAM: profile
- PDB structures: RCSB PDB PDBe PDBsum
- Gene Ontology: AmiGO / QuickGO
Search
- PMC: articles
- PubMed: articles
- NCBI: proteins

In enzymology, a gluconate 2-dehydrogenase (EC 1.1.1.215) is an enzyme that catalyzes the chemical reaction

D-gluconate + NADP^{+} $\rightleftharpoons$ 2-dehydro-D-gluconate + NADPH + H^{+}

Thus, the two substrates of this enzyme are D-gluconate and NADP^{+}, whereas its 3 products are 2-dehydro-D-gluconate, NADPH, and H^{+}.

This enzyme belongs to the family of oxidoreductases, specifically those acting on the CH-OH group of donor with NAD^{+} or NADP^{+} as acceptor. The systematic name of this enzyme class is D-gluconate:NADP^{+} oxidoreductase. Other names in common use include 2-keto-D-gluconate reductase, and 2-ketogluconate reductase.
