= Isosaccharinic acid =

Organic compound complexing radionuclides arising from the degradation of cellulose

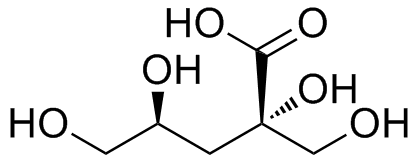

Names
- IUPAC name 3-Deoxy-2-C-(hydroxymethyl)-D-erythro-pentonic acid
- Systematic IUPAC name (2S,4S)-2,4,5-Trihydroxy-2-(hydroxymethyl)pentanoic acid
- Other names D-gluco-Isosaccharinic acid; Isosaccharinic acid; α-D-Glucoisosaccharinic acid; α-D-Isosaccharinic acid; α-Glucoisosaccharinic acid; α-Isosaccharinic acid

Identifiers
| CAS Number | 1518-54-3 |
| 3D model (JSmol) | Interactive image |
| ChemSpider | 19954310 |
| PubChem CID | 15200 |
| UNII | 2Z6W76T3BN |
| CompTox Dashboard (EPA) | DTXSID10934347 |
- InChI: InChI=1S/C6H12O6/c7-2-4(9)1-6(12,3-8)5(10)11/h4,7-9,12H,1-3H2,(H,10,11)/t4-,6-/m0/s1 Key: SGOVJIDEXZEOTB-NJGYIYPDSA-N; InChI=1/C6H12O6/c7-2-4(9)1-6(12,3-8)5(10)11/h4,7-9,12H,1-3H2,(H,10,11)/t4-,6-/m0/s1 Key: SGOVJIDEXZEOTB-NJGYIYPDBR
- SMILES: OC[C@@H](O)C[C@@](CO)(O)C(O)=O

Properties
| Chemical formula | C_{6}H_{12}O_{6} |
| Molar mass | 180.156 g·mol^{−1} |
| Melting point | 189 to 194 °C (372 to 381 °F; 462 to 467 K) |
- Except where otherwise noted, data are given for materials in their standard state (at 25 °C [77 °F], 100 kPa). verify (what is ?) Infobox references

Isosaccharinic acid (ISA) is a six-carbon sugar acid which is formed by the action of calcium hydroxide on lactose and other carbohydrates. It is of interest because it may form in intermediate-level nuclear waste stores when cellulose is degraded by the calcium hydroxide in cements such as Portland cement. The calcium salt of the alpha form of ISA is very crystalline and quite insoluble in cold water, but in hot water it is soluble.

ISA is thought to form by means of a series of reactions in which calcium ions acting as lewis acids catalyze two of the three steps. The first step is likely to be a rearrangement of the reducing sugar end of the cellulose (or lactose) into a keto sugar, the second step is likely to be a reaction similar to the base catalyzed dehydration which often occurs after an aldol reaction. In this second step an alkoxide (derived from a sugar) takes the role of the hydroxide leaving group, this second step is not likely to require the lewis acidity of the calcium. The final step is a benzilic acid rearrangement from a 1,2-diketone (1,5,6-trihydroxyhexane-2,3-dione) which is formed from the carbohydrate.

Under acidic conditions sugars tend to form furans such as furfural and 5-hydroxymethylfurfural by a series of dehydrations of the carbohydrate.

In acidic solutions the acid tends to form a 5-membered ring (lactone) by forming an ester between the carboxylic acid group and one of the alcohols. When treated under anhydrous conditions with acetone, an acid and a dehydration agent two of the alcohol groups can be protected as a cyclic acetone acetal thus leaving behind only one alcohol, prolonged treatment with 2,2-dimethoxypropane forms a protected form of ISA where all four of the alcohol groups are protected as acetone acetals and the carboxylic acid is in the form of the methyl ester. These protected forms of ISA have been used as a starting material for chiral organic compounds anthracyclines.

== Relevance for nuclear waste disposal ==
Since 1993, the diastereomers of isosaccharinic acid have received particular attention in the literature due to its ability to complex a range of radionuclides, potentially affecting their migration. ISA is formed as a result of interactions between cellulosic materials present within the intermediate level waste inventory various countries and the alkalinity resulting from the use of cementitious materials in the construction of a deep geological repository. Greenfield et al. (1993), have discovered that ISA and constituents formed in a cellulose degradation leachate were capable of forming soluble complexes with thorium, uranium (IV) and plutonium. In the case of plutonium, ISA concentrations higher than 10^{−5} M were capable of increasing solubility above pH 12.0, where concentrations of 1-5 × 10^{−3} M were found to increase the solubility by an order of magnitude from 10^{−5} to 10^{−4} M. Allard et al. (2006) found that a concentration of ISA of 2 × 10^{−3} M could increase plutonium solubility by a factor of 2 × 10^{5}. In addition a range of studies on the complexation properties of α-isosaccharinic acid in alkaline solutions with various metals of different valence, including nickel (II), europium (III), americium (III) and thorium (IV), have been conducted.

Vercammen et al. (2001) showed that although Ca(α-ISA)_{2} is sparingly soluble, both europium (III) and thorium (IV) were capable of forming soluble complexes with ISA between pH 10.7 and 13.3, where a mixed metal complex was observed in the presence of thorium. Wieland et al. (2002) also observed that α-ISA prevented the uptake of thorium by hardened cement pastes. Warwick et al. (2003) have also shown that ISA is capable of influencing the solubility of both uranium and nickel through complexation. Tits et al. (2005) observed that in the absence of ISA, europium, americium and thorium will sorb onto calcite aggregates present in concrete within an ILW GDF. Should ISA concentrations within the disposal facility exceed 10^{−5} mol L^{−1} (2 × 10^{−5} mol L^{−1} in the case of Th(IV)), it was reported that the sorption onto calcite would be significantly affected such that the radionuclides studied would no longer be sorbed to the cement and instead be complexed by ISA.

The effect of cellulose degradation products on radionuclide solubility and sorption is the subject of a study from 2013. Cellulose degradation product leachates were first produced by contacting cellulose sources (wood, rad wipes or cotton wool) with calcium hydroxide (pH 12.7) under anaerobic conditions. Analysis of the leachates across 1 000 days suggested that the primary product of the degradation was ISA, although a range of other organic compounds were formed and varied across cellulose source. In these experiments both ISA and X-ISA were able to increase the solubility of europium at pH 12, where in experiments with thorium ISA had a more profound effect on thorium solubility than X-ISA, for which little effect was observed.

More recently, a systematic study was published on the interactions between plutonium, ISA, and cement, as well as sorption. The investigation was focused on repository-like conditions, including high pH due to cementitious materials and low redox potential. The predominant species at various conditions were identified, including quaternary materials such as Ca(II)Pu(IV)(OH)_{3}ISA_{–H}^{+}. The sorption of Pu on cement was found to be significantly lowered due to complexation with ISA.

== Microbial activity in a geological disposal facility ==
ISA also represents a major carbon source within a geological disposal facility (GDF) since it comprises >70% of cellulose degradation products as a result of alkaline hydrolysis. The high pH associated with the massive use of concrete in such a facility means that microbial activity may or may not occur within the alkaline disturbed zone depending on the local microbial consortia intruding upon or surrounding such a facility in the post closure phase. Initial studies have shown that both alpha and beta forms of ISA are readily available for microbial activity under the anaerobic conditions expected within the far field of a disposal facility or within ungrouted waste packages. Since the pH of pore water within the near field of a disposal facility is expected to fall from 13.5 to 12.5 − 10 over tens of thousands of years, the ability of micro-organisms to adapt to these alkaline pH values has also been investigated. Mesophilic consortia have been shown to adapt to a pH of 10 within a number of weeks, ISA degradation ceased above pH 11.0. Microbial consortia from hyperalkaline environments in which exposure to pH > 11.0 has occurred for over a century have also been exposed to ISA generated from the alkaline hydrolysis of organic matter in situ. This consortia was readily capable of degrading ISA. It can also exist as polymicrobial flocculates, which has shown to be able of survival up to pH 12.5. As a result, the impact of microbial activity within a GDF is expected to be through the degradation of ISA's and production of gas, which may create overpressure but also through the generation of ^{14}C bearing gases.

== See also ==
- Gluconic acid (GLU), a concrete admixture (retarder)
- Glucuronic acid
- Kraft process (cellulose purification)
- Radioactive waste
- Saccharic acid
- Tartaric acid
- Uronic acid
