= Reactive dye printing =

Printing method

The chromophore (the chemical group of a dye responsible for colour) of reactive dyes contain substituents that react with the substrate to which it is applied. Reactive dyes have better fastness properties owing to this covalent bonding, and are the most important method for coloring cellulose fibers but can also be used on wool and nylon.

Reactive dye printing is a method of printing fabrics using reactive dye incorporated into a paste or wax including components such as sodium alginate gum, soda ash, urea and kerosin. Typically, the dye is dried at 130 degrees and cured at 180 degrees to permanently bond it, and the fabric later treated with a softener for better hand feel.
