= Xylonic acid =

d-Xylonic acid
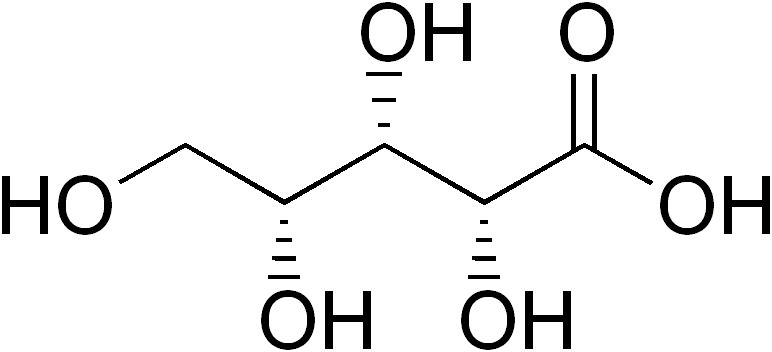

Names
- IUPAC name (2R,3S,4R)-2,3,4,5-tetrahydroxypentanoic acid
- Other names: d-Xylonic acid; d-xylo-Pentonic acid

Identifiers
CAS Number	17828-56-7 (d/l); 526-91-0 (d); 4172-44-5 (l>)
3D model (JSmol)	Interactive image
ChEBI	CHEBI:48093 (d); CHEBI:48092 (l)
ChemSpider	5034782
PubChem CID	6602431
UNII	OCI0V55QO1
CompTox Dashboard (EPA)	DTXSID701028292
- InChI: InChI=1S/C5H10O6/c6-1-2(7)3(8)4(9)5(10)11/h2-4,6-9H,1H2,(H,10,11)/t2-,3+,4-/m1/s1 Key: QXKAIJAYHKCRRA-FLRLBIABSA-N; InChI=1/C5H10O6/c6-1-2(7)3(8)4(9)5(10)11/h2-4,6-9H,1H2,(H,10,11)/t2-,3+,4-/m1/s1 Key: QXKAIJAYHKCRRA-FLRLBIABBX
- SMILES: C([C@H]([C@@H]([C@H](C(=O)O)O)O)O)O

Properties
Chemical formula	C_{5}H_{10}O_{6}
Molar mass	166.13 g/mol
Appearance	white solid
Melting point	120–122 °C (248–252 °F; 393–395 K)
- Except where otherwise noted, data are given for materials in their standard state (at 25 °C [77 °F], 100 kPa). verify (what is ?) Infobox references

Xylonic acid is the organic compound with the formula HOCH_{2}CH(OH)CH(OH)CH(OH)CO_{2}H. It is an oxidized derivative of xylose. Xylonic acid is a colorless, water-soluble solid. Several isomers are known, all being classified as sugar acids, several of which can be obtained by oxidation of the corresponding pentoses. The C-2 epimer of xylonic acid is known as lyxonic acid.

Like other sugar acids, xylonic acid readily converts to a lactone (RN 15384-37-9) by dehydration. Lyxonic acid behaves similarly.

Genetically engineered Pseudomonas fragi converts D-xylose to D-xylonic acid. Decarboxylation of the xylonic acid by a strain of Escherichia coli give 1,2,4-butanetriol, which is of commercial interest.
