= 1,2,4-Butanetriol =

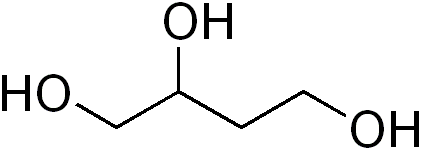

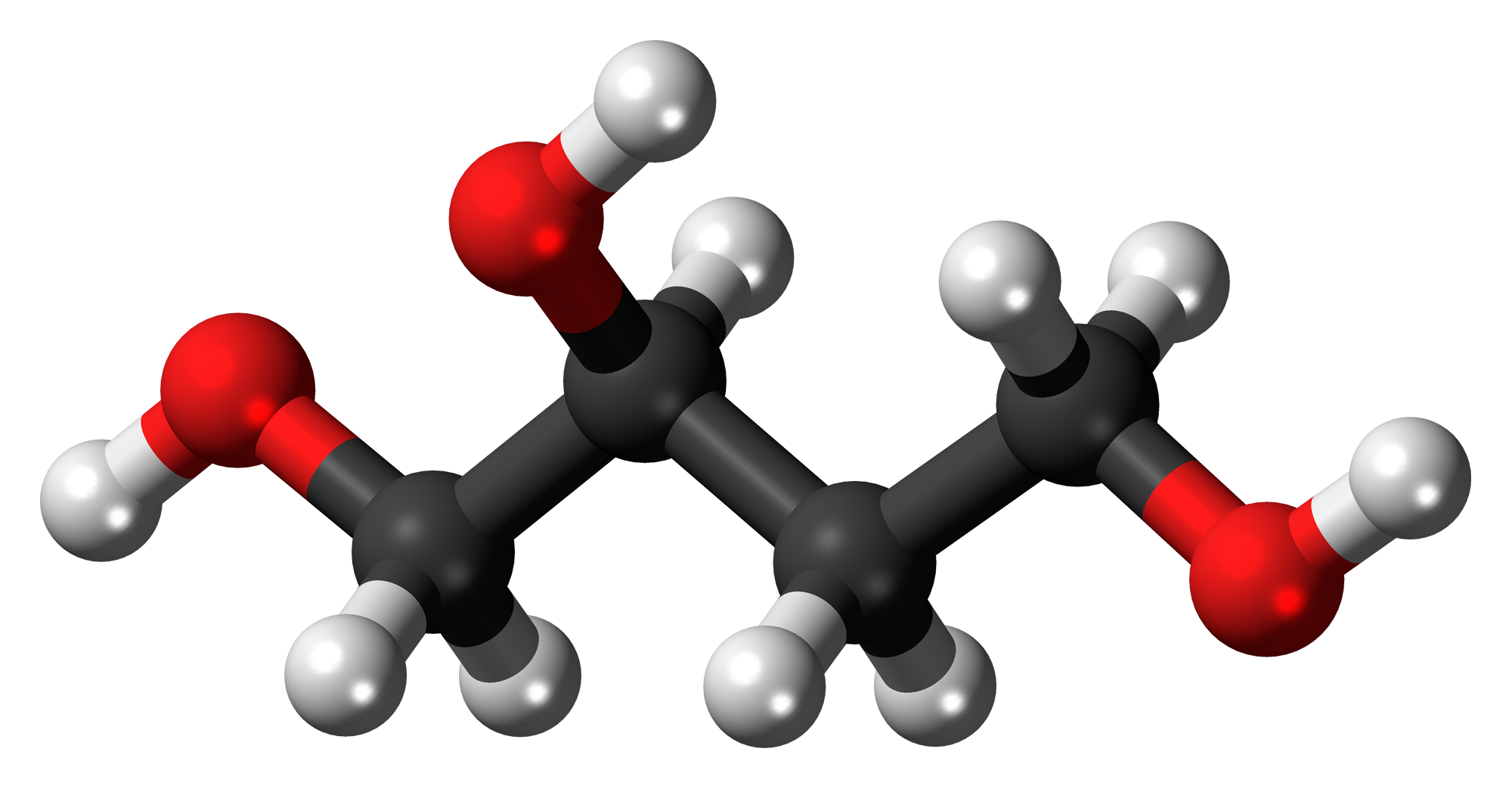
- C=black, H=white, O=red

Names
- Preferred IUPAC name Butane-1,2,4-triol
- Other names 1,2,4-Butanetriol; 1,2,4-Trihydroxybutane; Triol 124; 2-Deoxyerthritol

Identifiers
CAS Number	3068-00-6
3D model (JSmol)	Interactive image; Interactive image
ChEBI	CHEBI:88063
ChEMBL	ChEMBL1356759
ChemSpider	17287
ECHA InfoCard	100.019.385
EC Number	221-323-5
PubChem CID	18302
RTECS number	EK7176000
UNII	NK798C370H
CompTox Dashboard (EPA)	DTXSID8044416
- InChI: InChI=1S/C4H10O3/c5-2-1-4(7)3-6/h4-7H,1-3H2 Key: ARXKVVRQIIOZGF-UHFFFAOYSA-N; InChI=1/C4H10O3/c5-2-1-4(7)3-6/h4-7H,1-3H2 Key: ARXKVVRQIIOZGF-UHFFFAOYAQ
- SMILES: OCC(O)CCO; OCCC(O)CO

Properties
Chemical formula	C_{4}H_{10}O_{3}
Molar mass	106.121 g·mol^{−1}
Density	1.19
Boiling point	190 to 191 °C (374 to 376 °F; 463 to 464 K) 18 torr

Hazards
- GHS labelling
Pictograms	(GHS07: Exclamation mark)
Signal word	Warning
Hazard statements	H315, H319, H335
Precautionary statements	P261, P264, P271, P280, P302+P352, P304+P340, P305+P351+P338, P312, P321, P332+P313, P337+P313, P362, P403+P233, P405, P501
NFPA 704 (fire diamond)	2 1 0
Flash point	112 °C (234 °F; 385 K)
- Except where otherwise noted, data are given for materials in their standard state (at 25 °C [77 °F], 100 kPa). verify (what is ?) Infobox references

1,2,4-Butanetriol is an organic compound with the formula HOCH_{2}CH(OH)CH_{2}CH_{2}OH. It is an colorless, odorless, hygroscopic, oily liquid. Containing three alcohol groups, it is classified as a polyol, similar to glycerol and erythritol. It is chiral.

== Uses ==
1,2,4-Butanetriol is used in production of alkyd resins. It is also a precursor to butanetriol trinitrate (BTTN), an important component of US military rocket motor solid fuel.

As of 2014, it was commercially produced by a single Chinese company.

1,2,4-Butanetriol is also used as a precursor for two cholesterol-lowering drugs, Crestor and Zetia, which are derived from D-3,4-dihydroxybutanoic acid, by using 3-hydroxy-gamma-butyrolactone as a chiral synthon It is used as one of the monomers for manufacture of some polyesters and as a solvent.

== Preparation ==
1,2,4-Butanetriol can be prepared synthetically by several methods, such as hydroformylation of glycidol and subsequent reduction of the product. It can also be prepared by reduction of malic acid esters with sodium borohydride. The oxidation of butynediol with mercuric oxide followed by reduction of the resulting ketone.

Genetically engineered bacteria produce these triols in enantiopure form. Pseudomonas fragi converts D-xylose to D-xylonic acid, which is decarboxylated by a strain of Escherichia coli to D-triol. Similarly, D-arabinose is converted to D-arabinonic acid, which is converted to the L-triol.
