= 1,2,4-Butanetriol trinitrate =

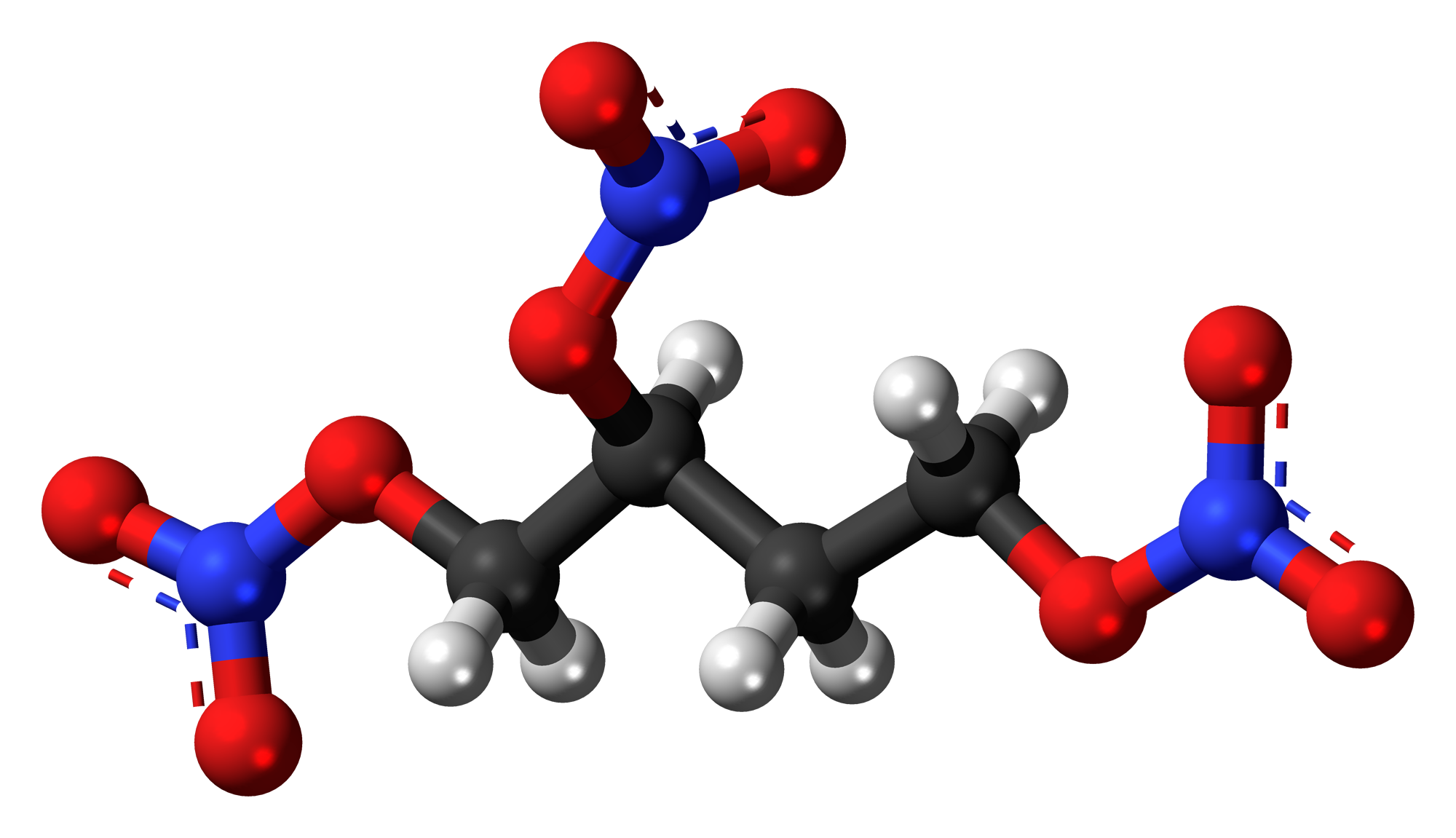
- C=black, H=white, O=red, N=blue

Names
- Preferred IUPAC name Butane-1,2,4-triyl trinitrate

Identifiers
CAS Number	6659-60-5
3D model (JSmol)	Interactive image
ChemSpider	455532
ECHA InfoCard	100.026.998
EC Number	229-697-1
PubChem CID	522216
UNII	ZV2U79W7V4
CompTox Dashboard (EPA)	DTXSID90863924
- InChI: InChI=1S/C4H7N3O9/c8-5(9)14-2-1-4(16-7(12)13)3-15-6(10)11/h4H,1-3H2 Key: RDLIBIDNLZPAQD-UHFFFAOYSA-N; InChI=1/C4H7N3O9/c8-5(9)14-2-1-4(16-7(12)13)3-15-6(10)11/h4H,1-3H2 Key: RDLIBIDNLZPAQD-UHFFFAOYAH
- SMILES: O=[N+]([O-])OC(CCO[N+]([O-])=O)CO[N+](=O)[O-]

Properties
Chemical formula	C_{4}H_{7}N_{3}O_{9}
Molar mass	241.11 g/mol
Density	1.52 g/cm3
Melting point	−27 °C
Boiling point	230 °C (446 °F; 503 K) (explosion temperature)

Hazards
- GHS labelling
Pictograms	(GHS01: Explosive) (GHS06: Toxic) (GHS08: Health hazard) (GHS09: Environmental hazard)
Signal word	Danger
Hazard statements	H200, H300, H310, H330, H373, H411
Precautionary statements	P201, P202, P260, P262, P264, P270, P271, P273, P280, P281, P284, P301+P316, P302+P352, P304+P340, P316, P319, P320, P321, P330, P361+P364, P372, P373, P380, P391, P401, P403+P233, P405, P501
- Except where otherwise noted, data are given for materials in their standard state (at 25 °C [77 °F], 100 kPa). verify (what is ?) Infobox references

1,2,4-Butanetriol trinitrate (BTTN), also called butanetriol trinitrate, is an important military propellant. It is a colorless to brown explosive liquid.

BTTN is used as a propellant in virtually all single-stage missiles used by the United States, including the Hellfire. It is less volatile, less sensitive to shock, and more thermally stable than nitroglycerine, for which it is a promising replacement.

BTTN as a propellant is often used in a mixture with nitroglycerin. The mixture can be made by co-nitration of butanetriol and glycerol. BTTN is also used as a plasticizer in some nitrocellulose-based propellants.

BTTN is manufactured by nitration of 1,2,4-butanetriol. Biotechnological manufacture of butanetriol is under intensive research.
