= Saccharic acid =

Chemical substance

Names
- IUPAC name D-glucaric acid
- Other names (2R,3S,4S,5S)-2,3,4,5-tetrahydroxyhexanedioic acid

Identifiers
CAS Number	87-73-0
3D model (JSmol)	Interactive image
ChEBI	CHEBI:16002
ChemSpider	30577
ECHA InfoCard	100.001.608
PubChem CID	33037
UNII	QLZ991V4A2
CompTox Dashboard (EPA)	DTXSID60859455
- InChI: InChI=1S/C6H10O8/c7-1(3(9)5(11)12)2(8)4(10)6(13)14/h1-4,7-10H,(H,11,12)(H,13,14)/t1-,2-,3-,4+/m0/s1 Key: DSLZVSRJTYRBFB-LLEIAEIESA-N; InChI=1/C6H10O8/c7-1(3(9)5(11)12)2(8)4(10)6(13)14/h1-4,7-10H,(H,11,12)(H,13,14)/t1-,2-,3-,4+/m0/s1 Key: DSLZVSRJTYRBFB-LLEIAEIEBD
- SMILES: O=C(O)[C@@H](O)[C@@H](O)[C@H](O)[C@@H](O)C(=O)O

Properties
Chemical formula	C_{6}H_{10}O_{8}
Molar mass	210.1388
Melting point	125-126 °C (decomposes)
Solubility in water	912 g/L
Acidity (pK_{a})	pK_{a1} = 3.01 pK_{a2} = 3.94

Hazards
- GHS labelling
Pictograms	(GHS02: Flammable) (GHS05: Corrosive)
Signal word	Danger
Hazard statements	H228, H314
Precautionary statements	P210, P240, P241, P260, P264, P264+P265, P280, P301+P330+P331, P302+P361+P354, P304+P340, P305+P354+P338, P316, P317, P321, P363, P370+P378, P405, P501
- Except where otherwise noted, data are given for materials in their standard state (at 25 °C [77 °F], 100 kPa). verify (what is ?) Infobox references

Saccharic acid or glucaric acid is a chemical compound with the formula C_{6}H_{10}O_{8}. It is an aldaric acid, naturally occurring in fruits and vegetables.

The salts of saccharic acid are called saccharates or glucarates.

== Synthesis ==
Saccharic acid can be prepared by oxidizing both the aldehydic and primary alcohol groups in an aldose, such as glucose, forming the dicarboxylic acid. A suitable reagent for this transformation is boiling 30% nitric acid, resulting in a yield of 50% to 65%. This reaction was first described by German chemist Heinrich Kiliani in 1925.

== Uses ==
=== Detergents ===
The sodium salt has found use in dishwasher detergents, where it acts as a chelating agent for calcium and magnesium ions. It is considered more environmentally friendly than phosphates, which are more commonly encountered in detergent formulations.

=== Dietary supplement ===
Saccharic acid salts have found use in dietary supplements, where they act as precursors to the β-glucuronidase inhibitor saccharolactone (d-glucaro-1,4-lactone). Some preclinical studies have demonstrated saccharolactone to have anticancerogenic and detoxification properties, although more clinical research is needed to confirm health impacts in humans.

== See also ==
- Disaccharides
- Gluconic acid
- Isosaccharinic acid
- Monosaccharides
- Mucic acid
- Saccharide
