= D-Galacturonic acid =

Sugar acid

d-Galacturonic acid

Names
- IUPAC name β-D-Galactopyranuronic acid

Identifiers
CAS Number	685-73-4
3D model (JSmol)	Interactive image; Interactive image
ChEBI	CHEBI:4153
ChemSpider	76444
ECHA InfoCard	100.035.495
EC Number	211-682-6
PubChem CID	84740
UNII	2ENU0N1DRP
CompTox Dashboard (EPA)	DTXSID2042646
- InChI: InChI=1S/C6H10O7/c7-1-2(8)3(9)4(10)5(11)6(12)13/h1-5,8-11H,(H,12,13)/t2-,3+,4+,5-/m0/s1 Key: IAJILQKETJEXLJ-RSJOWCBRSA-N; InChI=1/C6H10O7/c7-1-2(8)4(5(10)11)13-6(12)3(1)9/h1-4,6-9,12H,(H,10,11)/t1-,2+,3+,4-,6?/m0/s1 Key: AEMOLEFTQBMNLQ-YMDCURPLBW; InChI=1/C6H10O7/c7-1-2(8)3(9)4(10)5(11)6(12)13/h1-5,8-11H,(H,12,13)/t2-,3+,4+,5-/m0/s1 Key: IAJILQKETJEXLJ-RSJOWCBRBL
- SMILES: O=C(O)[C@H]1OC(O)[C@H](O)[C@@H](O)[C@H]1O; O=C[C@H](O)[C@@H](O)[C@@H](O)[C@H](O)C(=O)O

Properties
Chemical formula	C_{6}H_{10}O_{7}
Molar mass	194.139
Melting point	159 °C (318 °F; 432 K)
- Except where otherwise noted, data are given for materials in their standard state (at 25 °C [77 °F], 100 kPa). verify (what is ?) Infobox references

d-Galacturonic acid is a sugar acid, an oxidized form of d-galactose. It is the main component of pectin, in which it exists as the polymer polygalacturonic acid. In its open form, it has an aldehyde group at C1 and a carboxylic acid group at C6. Other oxidized forms of d-galactose are d-galactonic acid (carboxylic group at C1) and meso-galactaric acid (mucic acid) (carboxylic groups at C1 and C6). It is also a uronic acid or hexuronic acid. Naturally occurring uronic acids are d-glucuronic acid, d-galacturonic acid, l-iduronic acid and d-mannuronic acid.
