= Nutrition Reviews =

- Discipline: Nutrition science
- Language: English
- Edited by: Douglas Taren, PhD, MS

Publication details
- History: 1942-present
- Publisher: Oxford University Press
- Frequency: Monthly
- Impact factor: 5.788 (2017)

Standard abbreviations
- ISO 4: Nutr. Rev.

Indexing
- CODEN: NUREA8
- ISSN: 0029-6643 (print); 1753-4887 (web)

Links
- Journal homepage; Online access; Online archive

Nutrition Reviews is a monthly peer-reviewed medical journal publishing review articles in the field of nutrition science. It was established by the Nutrition Foundation of New York City under the leadership of Charles Glen King in 1942 and was acquired by Oxford University Press in 2015. The editor-in-chief is Douglas Taren (The University of Arizona). According to the Journal Citation Reports, the journal has a 2017 impact factor of 5.788, ranking it 6th out of 81 journals in the category "Nutrition & Dietetics".

The journal is published on behalf of the International Life Sciences Institute (ILSI), an organization "set up in 1978 by a former executive from Coca-Cola, to push for its agenda in the scientific and policy spaces". It has been found that it publishes the highest proportion of articles with industry involvement amongst the top top 10 journals in nutrition.
