= Alginic acid =

Polysaccharide found in brown algae

Names
- Other names Alginic acid; E400; [D-ManA(β1→4)L-GulA(α1→4)]_{n}

Identifiers
CAS Number	9005-32-7
ChemSpider	None
ECHA InfoCard	100.029.697
EC Number	232-680-1
E number	E400 (thickeners, ...)
UNII	8C3Z4148WZ
CompTox Dashboard (EPA)	DTXSID601010868

Properties
Chemical formula	(C_{6}H_{8}O_{6})_{n}
Molar mass	10,000 – 600,000
Appearance	White to yellow, fibrous powder
Density	1.601 g/cm^{3}
Acidity (pK_{a})	1.5–3.5

Pharmacology
ATC code	A02BX13 (WHO)
- Except where otherwise noted, data are given for materials in their standard state (at 25 °C [77 °F], 100 kPa). verify (what is ?) Infobox references

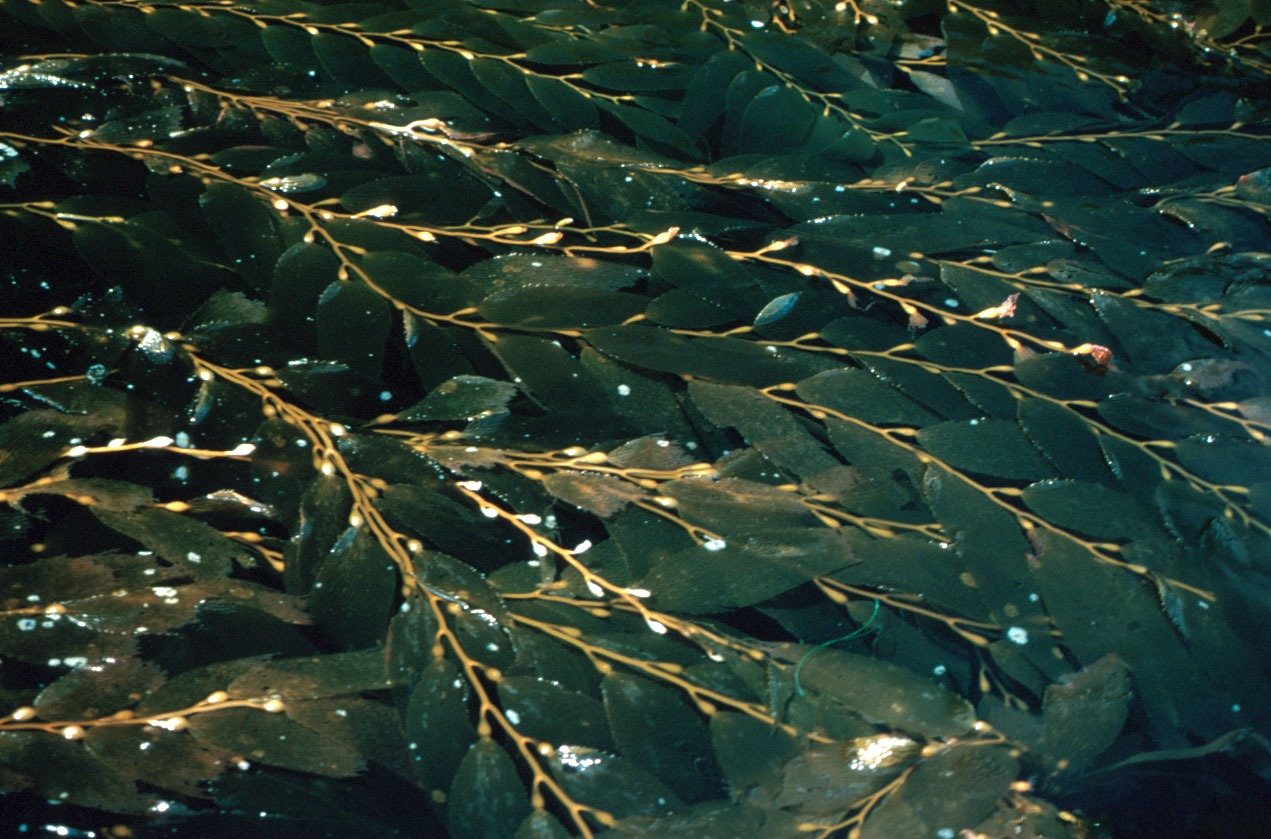
Macrocystis pyrifera, the largest species of giant kelp

Alginic acid, also called algin, is a naturally occurring, edible polysaccharide found in brown algae. It is hydrophilic and forms a viscous gum when hydrated. When the alginic acid binds with sodium and calcium ions, the resulting salts are known as alginates. Its colour ranges from white to yellowish-brown. It is sold in filamentous, granular, and powdered forms.

It is a significant component of the biofilms produced by the bacterium Pseudomonas aeruginosa, a major pathogen found in the lungs of some people who have cystic fibrosis. The biofilm and P. aeruginosa have a high resistance to antibiotics, but are susceptible to inhibition by macrophages.

Alginate was discovered by the British chemical scientist E. C. C. Stanford in 1881, and he patented an extraction process for it in the same year. The alginate was extracted, in the original patent, by first soaking the algae in water or diluted acid. The resulting insoluble alginic acid is then treated with an alkaline solution such as sodium carbonate, creating sodium alginate, before finally precipitating and purifying the alginate from solution.

== Structure ==
Alginic acid is a linear copolymer with homopolymeric blocks of (1→4)-linked β-D-mannuronate (M) and α-L-guluronate (G) residues, respectively, covalently linked together in different sequences or blocks. The monomers may appear in homopolymeric blocks of consecutive G-residues (G-blocks), consecutive M-residues (M-blocks) or alternating M and G-residues (MG-blocks). α-L-guluronate is the C-5 epimer of β-D-mannuronate.

== Forms ==
Alginates are refined from brown seaweeds. Throughout the world, many of the Phaeophyceae class brown seaweeds are harvested to be processed and converted into sodium alginate. Sodium alginate is used in many industries including food, animal food, fertilisers, textile printing, and pharmaceuticals. Dental impression material uses alginate as its means of gelling. Food grade alginate is an approved ingredient in processed and manufactured foods.

Brown seaweeds range in size from the giant kelp Macrocystis pyrifera which can be 20–40 meters long, to thick, leather-like seaweeds from 2–4 m long, to smaller species 30–60 cm long. Most brown seaweed used for alginates are gathered from the wild, with the exception of Laminaria japonica, which is cultivated in China for food and its surplus material is diverted to the alginate industry in China.

Alginates from different species of brown seaweed vary in their chemical structure, resulting in different physical properties of alginates. Some species yield an alginate that gives a strong gel, another a weaker gel, some may produce a cream or white alginate, while others are difficult to gel and are best used for technical applications where color does not matter.

Commercial grade alginate is extracted from giant kelp Macrocystis pyrifera, Ascophyllum nodosum, and types of Laminaria. Alginates are also produced by two bacterial genera Pseudomonas and Azotobacter, which played a major role in the unravelling of its biosynthesis pathway. Bacterial alginates are useful for the production of micro- or nanostructures suitable for medical applications.

Sodium alginate (NaC_{6}H_{7}O_{6}) is the sodium salt of alginic acid. Sodium alginate is a gum.

Potassium alginate (KC_{6}H_{7}O_{6}) is the potassium salt of alginic acid.

Calcium alginate (CaC_{12}H_{14}O_{12}) is the calcium salt of alginic acid. It is made by replacing the sodium ion in sodium alginate with a calcium ion (ion exchange).

== Production ==
The manufacturing process used to extract sodium alginates from brown seaweed fall into two categories: 1) calcium alginate method where the brown seaweed is first treated with calcium chloride to form a calcium alginate intermediate before washing with hydrochloric acid, and, 2) alginic acid method where there is no calcium alginate intermediate and the brown seaweed is treated only with the hydrochloric acid to extract sodium alginate.

Chemically the process is simple, but difficulties arise from the physical separations required between the slimy residues from viscous solutions and the separation of gelatinous precipitates that hold large amounts of liquid within their structure, so they resist filtration and centrifugation. The conventional process involves large amounts of reagents and solvents, as well as time-consuming steps. Simpler and newer techniques, such as microwave-assisted extraction, ultrasound, high pressure, pressurized fluid extraction, and enzyme-assisted extraction, are the subject of research.

The most common, conventional extraction process involves six steps: pre-treatment of the algal biomass, acid treatment, alkaline extraction, precipitation, bleaching, and drying. Pre-treatments mainly aim at either breaking the cell wall to help extract the alginate, or removing other compounds and contaminants from the algae. Drying is of the first kind, also helping to prevent bacterial growth; algae which is dried is also usually powdered to expose more surface area. Common treatments to remove contaminants include treatments with ethanol and formaldehyde, the latter of which is very common; ethanol solutions help remove compounds bonded to the alginate, and formaldehyde solutions help prevent enzymatic or microbial reactions.

The algae is then treated with an acidic solution to help disrupt cell walls, which converts the alginate salts into insoluble alginic acid; a subsequently applied alkaline solution (pH 9-10), usually sodium carbonate, converts it back into water-soluble sodium alginate, which is then precipitated. It is also possible to extract the alginate directly with an alkaline treatment, but this is less common.

Alginic acid is usually precipitated, through different techniques, with either an alcohol (usually ethanol), calcium chloride, or hydrochloric acid. After the alginin is precipitated into a fine paste, it is dried, ground to the desired grain size, and finally purified through a variety of techniques. Commercial alginate for biomedical and pharmaceutical use is extracted and purified through more rigorous techniques, but these are trade secrets.

=== Derivatives ===
Various alginate-based materials can be produced, including porous scaffold material, alginate hydrogel, nonwoven fabric, and alginate membranes. Techniques used to produce these include ion cross-linking, microfluidic spinning, freeze drying, wet spinning, and immersive centrifugal jet spinning.

Calcium salts added to a sodium alginate solution to induce ionic cross-linking, which produces the hydrogel. Freeze-drying the hydrogel to eliminate water produces the porous scaffold material.

Wet spinning consists of extruding an alginate solution from a spinneret into a calcium salt solution to induce ionic cross-linking (forming the gel), and then drawing the fibers out of the bath with draft rollers. Microfluidic spinning, a simpler and more eco-friendly implementation of the process, involves introducing calcium salt flows flowing alongside and touching a central "core" flow of alginate. These flows form a "sheath". The fiber then emerges from the core flow. This technique can be used to produce shaped and grooved fibers.

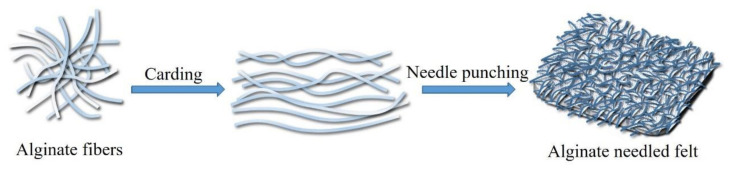
Preparation of the alginate nonwoven fabric by the acupuncture technique

Alginate fiber, which is used in fabric, is usually produced through either microfluidic spinning, wet spinning, or electrospinning to obtain thinner fibers. Those fibers are used to produce alginate nonwoven fabric by carding and needle punching. The resulting felts are used in wound dressings, facial masks, and tissue scaffolds due to its hygroscopic and water retention ability.

== Uses ==
As of 2022, alginate had become one of the most preferred materials as an abundant natural biopolymer. It is particularly useful as a biomaterial because of its nontoxicity, hygroscopicity, and biocompatibility, and can imitate local bioenvironments; its degradation product can be easily cleared by the kidneys.

Alginate absorbs water quickly, which makes it useful as an additive in dehydrated products such as slimming aids, and in the manufacture of paper and textiles.

Alginate is also used for waterproofing and fireproofing fabrics, in the food industry as a thickening agent for drinks, ice cream, cosmetics, as a gelling agent for jellies, known by the code E401 and sausage casing. Sodium alginate is mixed with soybean protein to make meat analogue.

Alginate is used as an ingredient in various pharmaceutical preparations, such as Gaviscon, in which it combines with bicarbonate to inhibit gastroesophageal reflux.

Sodium alginate is used as an impression-making material in dentistry, prosthetics, lifecasting, and for creating positives for small-scale casting.

Sodium alginate is used in reactive dye printing and as a thickener for reactive dyes in textile screen-printing. Alginates do not react with these dyes and wash out easily, unlike starch-based thickeners. It also serves as a material for micro-encapsulation.

Calcium alginate is used in different types of medical products, including skin wound dressings, in the form of hydrogels, to promote healing, since alginate can increase the fluid uptake capacity of dressings, reducing the amount of times the dressing needs to be changed.

== Alginate hydrogels ==
In research on bone reconstruction, alginate composites have favorable properties encouraging regeneration, such as improved porosity, cell proliferation, and mechanical strength. Alginate hydrogel is a common biomaterial for bio-fabrication of scaffolds and tissue regeneration.

Covalent bonding of thiol groups to alginate improves in-situ gelling and mucoadhesive properties; the thiolated polymer (thiomer) forms disulfide bonds within its polymeric network and with cysteine-rich subdomains of the mucus layer. Thiolated alginates are used as in situ gelling hydrogels, and are under preliminary research as possible mucoadhesive drug delivery systems. Alginate hydrogels may be used for drug delivery, exhibiting responses to pH changes, temperature changes, redox, and the presence of enzymes.

== Bioencapsulations ==
Alginate is one of the most widely used polymers in bioencapsulation, particularly for the immobilisation or protection of living cells, enzymes, proteins and other bioactive materials. Its use is largely based on the ability of soluble alginate to form calcium alginate hydrogels under mild aqueous conditions, allowing biological material to be entrapped without exposure to harsh solvents, high temperature or aggressive chemical reactions.

In cell encapsulation, alginate beads or microcapsules can provide a semipermeable hydrogel matrix that permits diffusion of nutrients, oxygen and secreted products while physically separating the encapsulated cells from the surrounding environment. This approach has been investigated for immunoisolation, islet transplantation, cell therapy, tissue engineering and controlled delivery of biological products.

Alginate bioencapsulation systems can be produced by dripping, extrusion, air-jet cutting, electrostatic droplet generation, emulsification and microfluidic methods. These techniques differ in throughput, bead-size control, size distribution and suitability for encapsulating cells or labile biomolecules.

== See also ==
- Hyaluronic acid: a polysaccharide in animals.
- Agar
