= Pseudomonas fragi =

Scientific classification
- Domain: Bacteria
- Kingdom: Pseudomonadati
- Phylum: Pseudomonadota
- Class: Gammaproteobacteria
- Order: Pseudomonadales
- Family: Pseudomonadaceae
- Genus: Pseudomonas
- Species: P. fragi

Binomial name
- Pseudomonas fragi (Eichholz 1902); Gruber 1905

Type strain
- ATCC 4973 CCUG 556; CFBP 4556; CIP 55.4; DSM 3456; HAMBI 28; LMG 2191; NBRC 3458; NCCB 69033; NCTC 10689; NRRL B-25 and B-727; VKM B-898

Synonyms
- Bacterium fragi Eichholz 1902

Species of bacterium

Pseudomonas fragi is a psychrophilic, Gram-negative bacterium that is responsible for dairy spoilage. Unlike many other members of the genus Pseudomonas, P. fragi does not produce siderophores. Optimal temperature for growth is 30 °C, however it can grow between 0 and 35 °C. Based on 16S rRNA analysis, P. fragi has been placed in the P. chlororaphis group.
