= Glucuronic acid =

Sugar acid

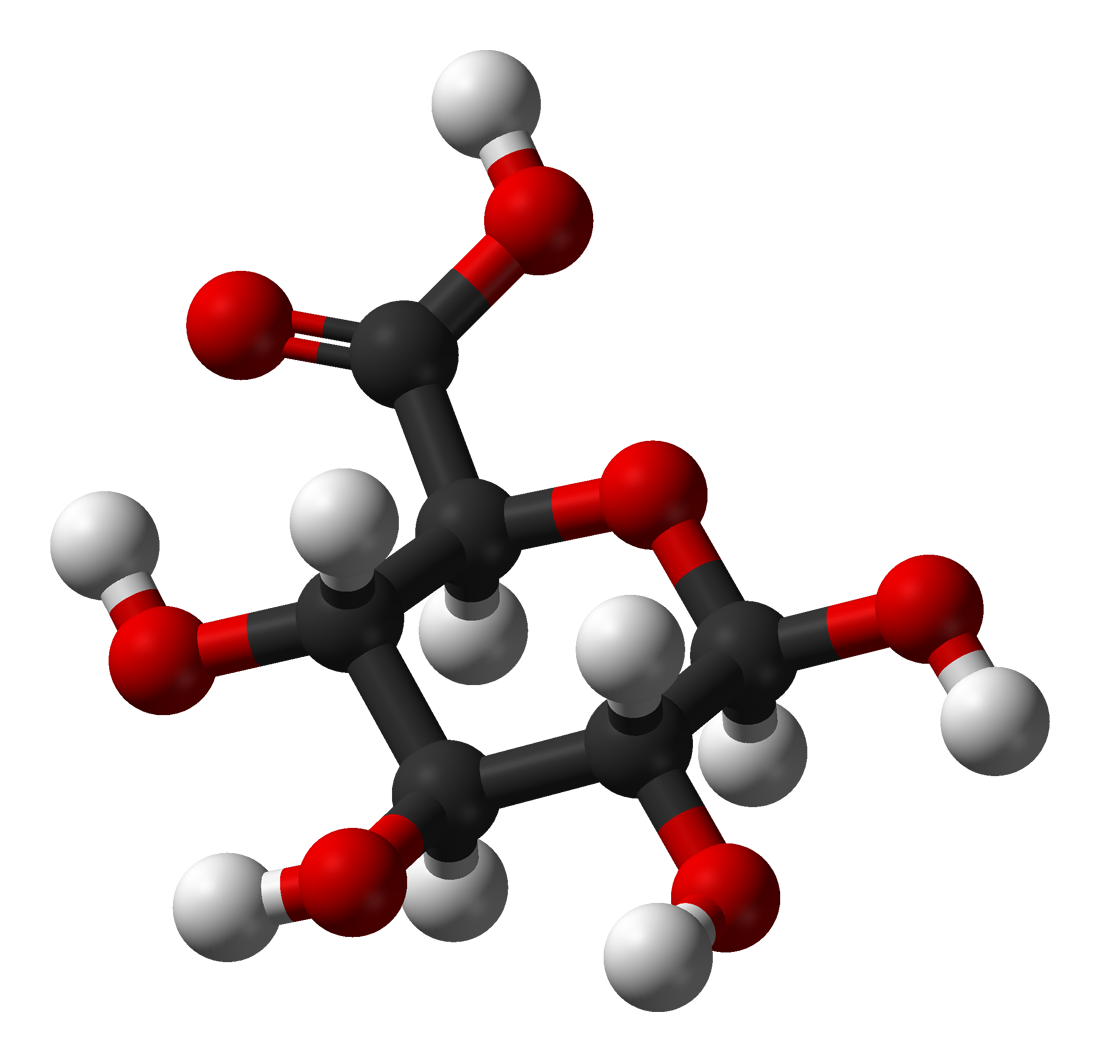

Names
- IUPAC name β-D-Glucopyranuronic acid
- Systematic IUPAC name (2S,3S,4S,5R,6R)-3,4,5,6-Tetrahydroxyoxane-2-carboxylic acid
- Other names β-D-Glucuronic acid, GlcA

Identifiers
CAS Number	6556-12-3
3D model (JSmol)	Interactive image
ChEBI	CHEBI:28860
ChemSpider	392615
DrugBank	DB03156
ECHA InfoCard	100.026.807
KEGG	C00191
MeSH	Glucuronic+acid
PubChem CID	441478
UNII	8A5D83Q4RW
CompTox Dashboard (EPA)	DTXSID40273973
- InChI: InChI=1S/C6H10O7/c7-1-2(8)4(5(10)11)13-6(12)3(1)9/h1-4,6-9,12H,(H,10,11)/t1-,2-,3+,4-,6-/m0/s1 Key: AEMOLEFTQBMNLQ-WAXACMCWSA-N; InChI=1/C6H10O7/c7-1-2(8)4(5(10)11)13-6(12)3(1)9/h1-4,6-9,12H,(H,10,11)/t1-,2-,3+,4-,6-/m0/s1 Key: AEMOLEFTQBMNLQ-WAXACMCWBB
- SMILES: O=C(O)[C@H]1O[C@H](O)[C@H](O)[C@@H](O)[C@@H]1O

Properties
Chemical formula	C_{6}H_{10}O_{7}
Molar mass	194.139 g·mol^{−1}
Melting point	159 to 161 °C (318 to 322 °F; 432 to 434 K)

Related compounds
Related uronic acids	Alluronic acid, Altruronic acid, Arabinuronic acid, Fructuronic acid, Galacturonic acid, Guluronic acid, Iduronic acid, Lyxuronic acid, Mannuronic acid, Psicuronic acid, Riburonic acid, Ribuluronic acid, Sorburonic acid, Tagaturonic acid, Taluronic acid, Xyluluronic acid, Xyluronic acid
- Except where otherwise noted, data are given for materials in their standard state (at 25 °C [77 °F], 100 kPa). verify (what is ?) Infobox references

Glucuronic acid (GCA, from Ancient Greek: γλεῦκος + οὖρον, lit. 'sweet wine, must + urine') is a uronic acid that was first isolated from urine (hence the name "uronic acid"). It is found in many gums such as gum arabic (approx. 18%), xanthan, and kombucha tea and is important for the metabolism of microorganisms, plants and animals.

== Properties ==
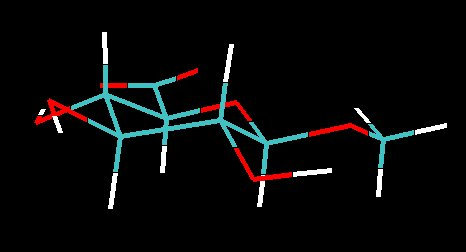
The β-D-methyl glycoside of glucuronic acid in the low energy ^{4}C_{1} conformation of D-glucose

Glucuronic acid is a sugar acid derived from glucose.

Sodium glucuronate can be produced by the direct oxidation of starch with concentrated nitric acid. In this preparation the low availability of water keeps the starch polymers from hydrolyzing and oxidizes only the free hydroxyls, in much the same way that nitrogen dioxide would oxidize the starch. Once this reaction is complete and the starch/nitric acid mix turns clear (after giving off nitrogen dioxide gas), the solution can be diluted, and hydrolyzed with another mineral acid. Then the oxidation is slowly quenched with sodium hydroxide (or sodium bicarbonate), forming sodium glucuronate, which can be crystallized out of solution. With transition metals, it forms complexes such as iron(III) glucuronate, iron(II) glucuronate, and copper(II) glucuronate.

== Functions ==
=== Glucuronidation ===
Glucuronidation of 4-aminobiphenyl by formation of a β-glycosidic bond.

It is possible to exhaust the body's supply of glucuronic acid by combining multiple drugs/substances whose metabolism and excretion are dependent on glucuronidation. Although most such substances have secondary metabolic routes which become prominent following GCA depletion, the rate of metabolism is reduced enough to produce a marked accumulation of all GCA substrates in the system; this often increases drug concentrations in the blood by medically relevant amounts. In the most severe cases, permanent and debilitating organ damage (particularly of the liver, kidneys, heart, and brain), and even death, have been known to occur. Ethanol, morphine, paracetamol (acetaminophen), cyclooxygenase inhibitors (NSAIDs), endogenous steroids, and certain benzodiazepines are all capable of contributing to GCA depletion, with ethanol and acetaminophen being the most commonly implicated substances involved in cases of accidental overdoses which have been positively attributed to glucuronic acid depletion.

Excessive quantities of GCA can also be hazardous to health. Tobacco smoke, most barbiturates, and some carbamates are known to stimulate GCA production. Increased GCA activity results in a decrease of the concentration and metabolic half-life of glucuronic acid substrates, causing the plasma levels of glucuronidated drugs to fall below their therapeutic threshold. Excessive glucuronidation of the substrates may result in an inadequate response to traditional doses of affected medications and, unless the drug has a very wide therapeutic index, will generally result in the acute failure of the pharmacotherapy and necessitate the transition from one or more implicated drugs to an equivalent regimen of non-glucuronidated alternatives. A select number of antidepressants and a wide range of anti-psychotic agents are glucuronidation ligands, but due to their delayed mechanism of action and pharmacokinetic properties the decrease of their plasma concentrations may not be immediately apparent and tends to present as a sudden and intense relapse of symptoms instead of a gradual regression to the behaviors and thought patterns exhibited by the patient prior to the initiation of their pharmacological treatment.

=== Role in disease ===
Glucuronic acid, as well as the glucuronidated metabolite of ethanol, ethyl glucuronide (ETG), acts on toll-like receptor 4 to aggravate both acute and chronic inflammatory conditions and increases the perceived severity of pain in patients with chronic pain conditions, via up-regulation of the production and release of endogenous inflammatory signaling molecules within the body. Long-term agonism of the TLR4 receptor (such as that which occurs from GCA, ETG, and opiates) results in chronically painful conditions being perceived as considerably more severe than they did previously, while pre-existing, tolerable yet occasionally painful activities can become more painful than before and will begin to be aggravated by briefer and less physically demanding activities. It also can cause equally painful responses to decreasingly noxious (irritating) stimuli, eventually resulting in considerable agony from stimuli which would not cause any amount of pain to most individuals.

== Use ==
The Glucuronidated metabolites of various chemicals can be tested for in bodily fluids. Ethyl glucuronide and ethyl sulfate are excreted in urine as metabolites of ethanol and are used to monitor alcohol use.

Glucuronic acid and gluconic acid are fermentation products in Kombucha tea.

Glucuronic acid is a precursor of ascorbic acid (vitamin C, formerly called L-hexuronic acid).

== See also ==
- Gluconic acid
- Isosaccharinic acid
- Uronic acid
