= Threonic acid =

l-threonic acid
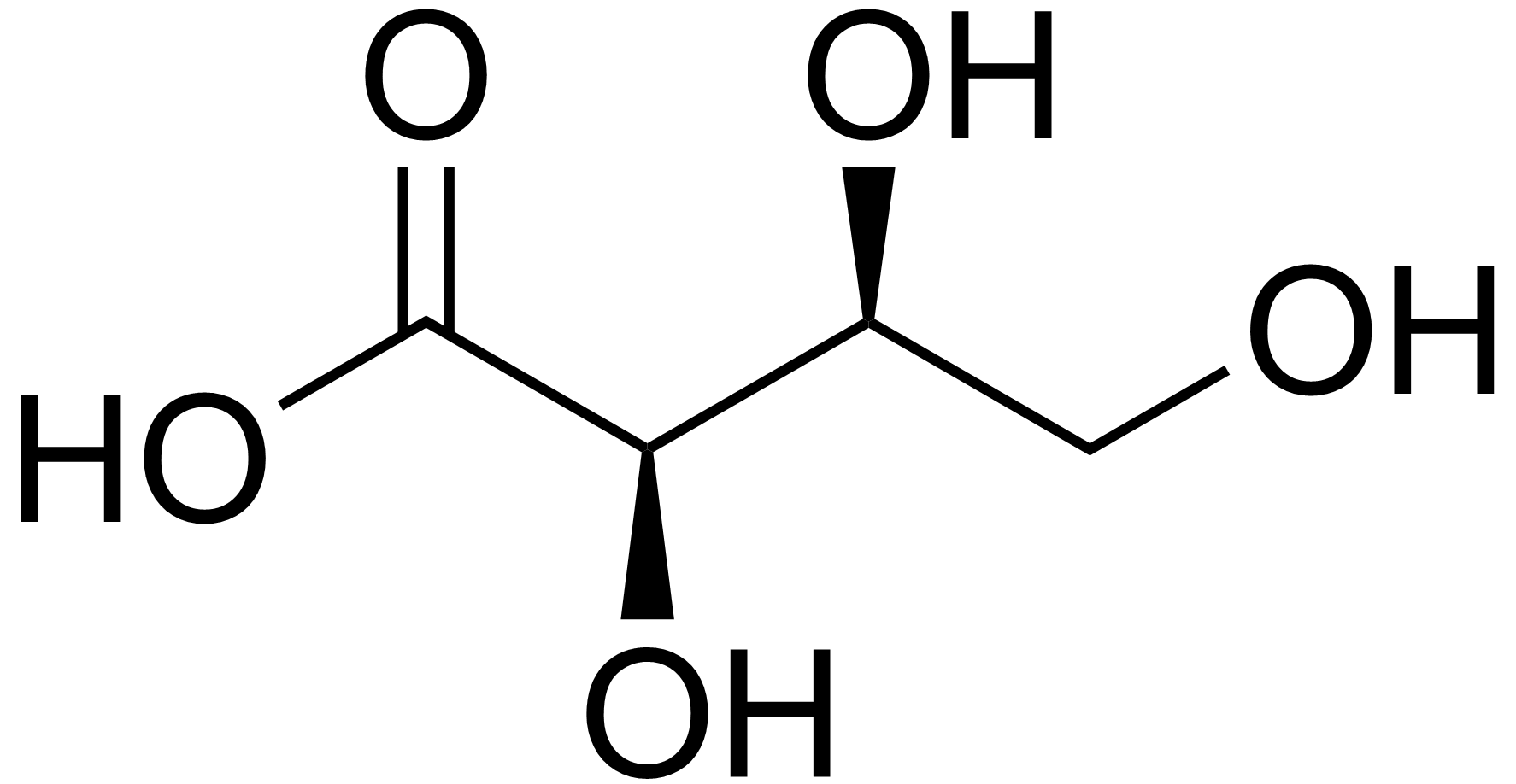

Names
- IUPAC name (2R,3S)-2,3,4-Trihydroxybutanoic acid

Identifiers
CAS Number	3909-12-4 (D/L); 20246-26-8 (D); 7306-96-9 (L)
3D model (JSmol)	(D): Interactive image; (L): Interactive image
ChemSpider	133224 (D); 4573940 (L)
PubChem CID	151152 (D); 5460407 (L)
UNII	NTD0MI8XRT (D/L); 75B0PMW2JF (L)
CompTox Dashboard (EPA)	DTXSID60223339
- InChI: InChI=1S/C4H8O5/c5-1-2(6)3(7)4(8)9/h2-3,5-7H,1H2,(H,8,9)/t2-,3+/m0/s1 Key: JPIJQSOTBSSVTP-STHAYSLISA-N; (D): InChI=1S/C4H8O5/c5-1-2(6)3(7)4(8)9/h2-3,5-7H,1H2,(H,8,9)/t2-,3+/m1/s1 Key: JPIJQSOTBSSVTP-GBXIJSLDSA-N
- SMILES: (D): C([C@H]([C@@H](C(=O)O)O)O)O; (L): C([C@@H]([C@H](C(=O)O)O)O)O

Properties
Chemical formula	C_{4}H_{8}O_{5}
Molar mass	136.103 g·mol^{−1}
Conjugate base	Threonate
- Except where otherwise noted, data are given for materials in their standard state (at 25 °C [77 °F], 100 kPa). verify (what is ?) Infobox references

Threonic acid is a sugar acid derived from threose. The l-isomer is a metabolite of ascorbic acid (vitamin C). One study suggested that because l-threonate inhibits DKK1 expression in vitro, it may have potential in treatment of androgenic alopecia.
