= Aldaric acid =

Family of sugar acids

Aldaric acids are a group of sugar acids, where the terminal hydroxyl and carbonyl groups of the sugars have been replaced by terminal carboxylic acids, and are characterised by the formula HO_{2}C-(CHOH)_{n}-CO_{2}H. Oxidation of just the aldehyde yields an aldonic acid while oxidation of just the terminal hydroxyl group yields an uronic acid.) Aldaric acids cannot form cyclic hemiacetals like unoxidized sugars, but they can sometimes form lactones.

== Synthesis and reactions ==
Aldaric acids are usually synthesized by the oxidation of aldoses with nitric acid. In this reaction it is the open-chain (polyhydroxyaldehyde) form of the sugar that reacts. These compounds are of interest as bio-derived chemicals including to bio-derived polyesters.

== Structure ==
Nomenclature of the aldaric acids is based on the sugars from which they are derived; for example, glucose is oxidized to glucaric acid and xylose to xylaric acid.

Unlike their parent sugars, aldaric acids have the same functional group at both ends of their carbon chain; therefore, two different sugars can yield the same aldaric acid (this can be understood by looking at the Fischer projection of a sugar upside down—with normal aldoses, this is a different compound due to the aldehyde function at the top and the hydroxyl function at the bottom, but with aldaric acids, there is a carboxylic acid function on both ends, so upside down and right side up do not matter). For example, D-glucaric acid and L-gularic acid are the same compound (but the first name is preferred, because of D- prefix). A consequence of this is that some aldaric acids are meso forms with no optical activity despite their multiple chiral centers—this occurs if a sugar and its enantiomer oxidize to the same aldaric acid. An example is D-galactose—it has four chiral centers, but D-galactaric and L-galactaric acids, which have the opposite configuration at each chiral center and therefore would be expected to be enantiomers, are actually the same compound; therefore, galactaric acid is an achiral meso form with no optical activity. Again, this can be understood by taking the Fischer projection of either acid and looking at it upside down—the configuration is now switched at every carbon.

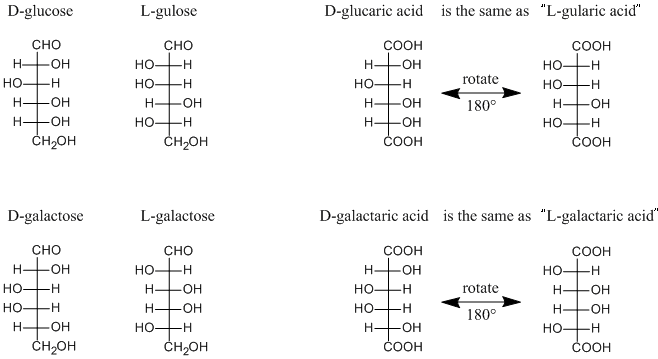
