= Mucic acid =

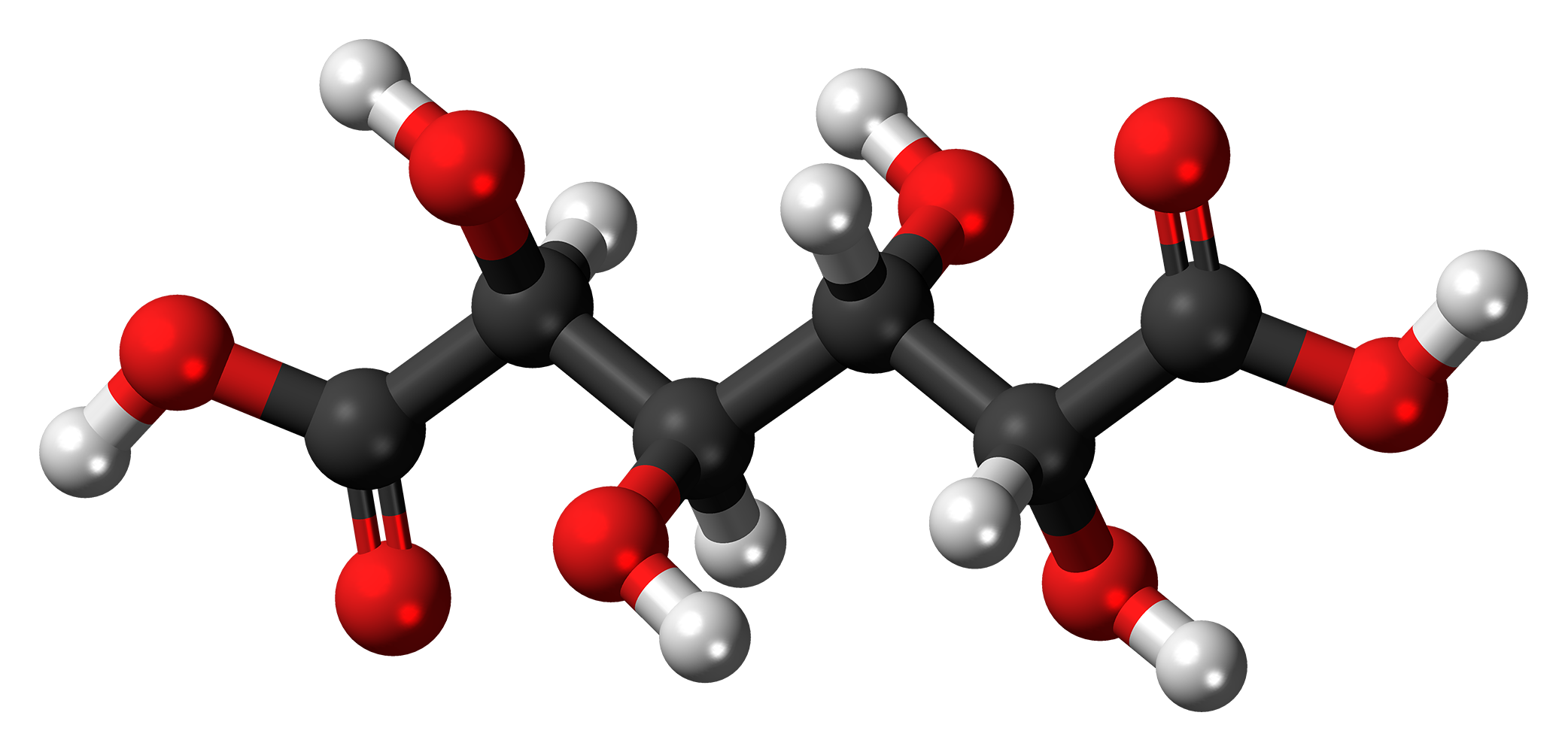

Names
- IUPAC name meso-Galactaric acid
- Systematic IUPAC name (2S,3R,4S,5R)-2,3,4,5-Tetrahydroxyhexanedioic acid
- Other names Galactaric acid; Galactosaccharic acid

Identifiers
| CAS Number | 526-99-8 |
| 3D model (JSmol) | Interactive image |
| ChEMBL | ChEMBL1232958 |
| ChemSpider | 2301286 |
| ECHA InfoCard | 100.007.641 |
| PubChem CID | 3037582 |
| UNII | E149J5OTIF |
| CompTox Dashboard (EPA) | DTXSID7048740 |
- InChI: InChI=1S/C6H10O8/c7-1(3(9)5(11)12)2(8)4(10)6(13)14/h1-4,7-10H,(H,11,12)(H,13,14)/t1-,2+,3+,4- Key: DSLZVSRJTYRBFB-DUHBMQHGSA-N; InChI=1/C6H10O8/c7-1(3(9)5(11)12)2(8)4(10)6(13)14/h1-4,7-10H,(H,11,12)(H,13,14)/t1-,2+,3+,4- Key: DSLZVSRJTYRBFB-DUHBMQHGBT
- SMILES: [C@@H]([C@@H]([C@H](C(=O)O)O)O)([C@@H](C(=O)O)O)O

Properties
| Chemical formula | C_{6}H_{10}O_{8} |
| Molar mass | 210.138 g·mol^{−1} |
| Melting point | 230 °C (446 °F; 503 K) |
- Except where otherwise noted, data are given for materials in their standard state (at 25 °C [77 °F], 100 kPa). verify (what is ?) Infobox references

Mucic acid, C_{6}H_{10}O_{8} or HOOC-(CHOH)_{4}-COOH (galactaric acid or meso-galactaric acid) is an aldaric acid obtained by nitric acid oxidation of galactose or galactose-containing compounds such as lactose, dulcite, quercite, and most varieties of gum.

== Properties ==
Mucic acid forms a crystalline powder, which melts at 210–230 °C. It is insoluble in alcohol, and nearly insoluble in cold water. Due to the symmetry in the molecule, it is optically inactive even though it has chiral carbon atoms (i.e., it is a meso compound).

== Reactions ==
When heated with pyridine to 140 °C, it is converted into allomucic acid. When digested with fuming hydrochloric acid for some time it is converted into αα′ furfural dicarboxylic acid while on heating with barium sulfide it is transformed into α-thiophene carboxylic acid. The ammonium salt yields on dry distillation carbon dioxide, ammonia, pyrrol and other substances. The acid when fused with caustic alkalis yields oxalic acid.

With potassium bisulfate mucic acid forms 3-hydroxy-2-pyrone by dehydration and decarboxylation.

Reaction of mucic acid to 3-hydroxy-2-pyrone with a) potassium bisulfate 160 °C / 4 hrs. b) hydrochloric acid to pH = 7

== Use ==
Mucic acid can be used to replace tartaric acid in self-raising flour or fizzies.

It has been used as a precursor of adipic acid in the way to nylon by a rhenium-catalyzed deoxydehydration reaction.

It has been used as a precursor of Taxol in Nicolaou Taxol total synthesis (1994).

== See also ==
- Muconic acid
