= Uronic acid =

Class of carbohydrate

The β-D form of glucuronic acid (after oxidization).

Glucose (before oxidization)

The Fischer projections of D-glucose (left) and D-glucuronic acid (right). Glucose's terminal carbon's primary alcohol group has been oxidized to a carboxylic acid.

Uronic acids (/ʊˈrɒnɪk/) or alduronic acids are a class of sugar acids with both carbonyl and carboxylic acid functional groups. They are sugars in which the hydroxyl group furthest from the carbonyl group has been oxidized to a carboxylic acid. Usually the sugar is an aldose, but fructuronic acid also occurs. Oxidation of the terminal aldehyde instead yields an aldonic acid, while oxidation of both the terminal hydroxyl group and the aldehyde yields an aldaric acid. The names of uronic acids are generally based on their parent sugars, for example, the uronic acid analog of glucose is glucuronic acid. Uronic acids derived from hexoses are known as hexuronic acids and uronic acids derived from pentoses are known as penturonic acids.

== Examples ==
Some of these compounds have important biochemical functions; for example, many wastes in the human body are excreted in the urine as their glucuronate salts, and iduronic acid is a component of some structural complexes such as proteoglycans.

== See also ==
- Gluconic acid
- Glucuronic acid
- Isosaccharinic acid
