= Fructuronate reductase =

fructuronate reductase

Identifiers
- EC no.: 1.1.1.57
- CAS no.: 9028-44-8

Databases
- IntEnz: IntEnz view
- BRENDA: BRENDA entry
- ExPASy: NiceZyme view
- KEGG: KEGG entry
- MetaCyc: metabolic pathway
- PRIAM: profile
- PDB structures: RCSB PDB PDBe PDBsum
- Gene Ontology: AmiGO / QuickGO
Search
- PMC: articles
- PubMed: articles
- NCBI: proteins

In enzymology, fructuronate reductase (EC 1.1.1.57) is an enzyme that catalyzes the chemical reaction

D-mannonic acid
+ NAD^{+}
H^{+}
H^{+}
keto-D-fructuronic acid
+ NADH

The two substrates of this enzyme are D-mannonic acid and oxidised nicotinamide adenine dinucleotide (NAD^{+}). Its products are D-fructuronic acid (shown in its keto form), reduced NADH, and a proton.

This enzyme belongs to the family of oxidoreductases, specifically those acting on the CH-OH group of donor with NAD^{+} or NADP^{+} as acceptor. The systematic name of this enzyme class is D-mannonate:NAD^{+} 5-oxidoreductase. Other names in common use include mannonate oxidoreductase, mannonic dehydrogenase, D-mannonate dehydrogenase, and D-mannonate:NAD^{+} oxidoreductase. This enzyme participates in pentose and glucuronate interconversions.
