= Gluconic acid =

d-Gluconic acid
- Skeletal formula of gluconic acid

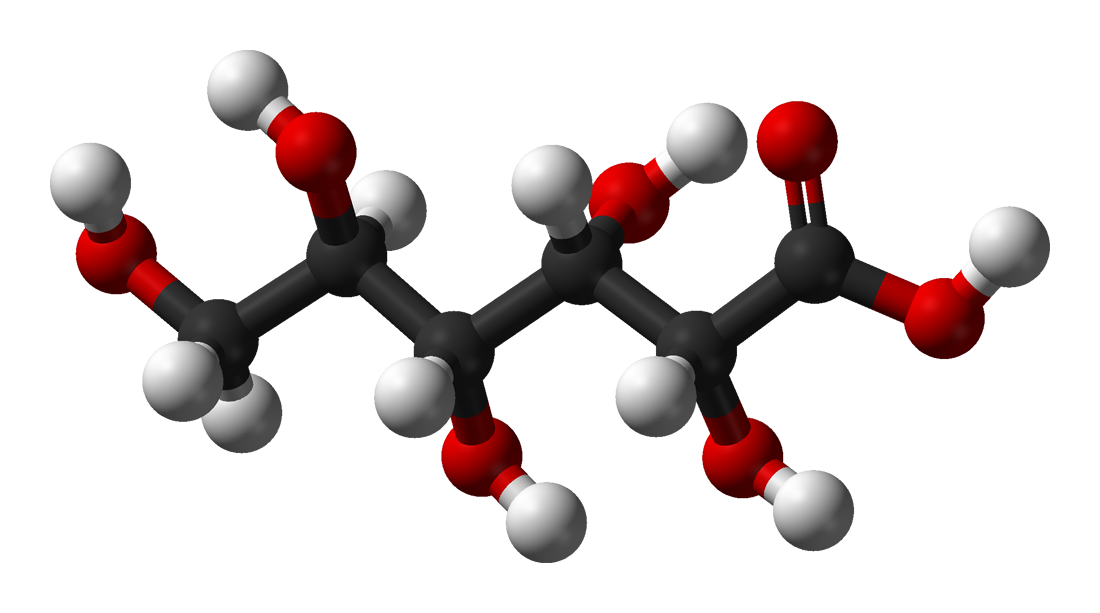
- Ball-and-stick model of gluconic acid

Names
- IUPAC name d-Gluconic acid
- Systematic IUPAC name (2R,3S,4R,5R)-2,3,4,5,6-Pentahydroxyhexanoic acid
- Other names: Dextronic acid

Identifiers
CAS Number	526-95-4 (D); 133-42-6 (racemate)
3D model (JSmol)	Interactive image
ChEBI	CHEBI:33198
ChEMBL	ChEMBL464345
ChemSpider	10240
ECHA InfoCard	100.007.639
EC Number	208-401-4
E number	E574 (acidity regulators, ...)
PubChem CID	10690
UNII	R4R8J0Q44B (D)
CompTox Dashboard (EPA)	DTXSID8027169
- InChI: InChI=1S/C6H12O7/c7-1-2(8)3(9)4(10)5(11)6(12)13/h2-5,7-11H,1H2,(H,12,13)/t2-,3-,4+,5-/m1/s1 Key: RGHNJXZEOKUKBD-SQOUGZDYSA-N; InChI=1/C6H12O7/c7-1-2(8)3(9)4(10)5(11)6(12)13/h2-5,7-11H,1H2,(H,12,13)/t2-,3-,4+,5-/m1/s1 Key: RGHNJXZEOKUKBD-SQOUGZDYBY
- SMILES: O=C(O)[C@H](O)[C@@H](O)[C@H](O)[C@H](O)CO

Properties
Chemical formula	C_{6}H_{12}O_{7}
Molar mass	196.155 g·mol^{−1}
Appearance	Colorless crystals
Density	1.23 g/cm^{3}
Melting point	131 °C (268 °F; 404 K)
Solubility in water	316 g/L
Acidity (pK_{a})	3.86

Hazards
- GHS labelling
Pictograms	(GHS07: Exclamation mark)
Signal word	Warning
Hazard statements	H315, H319
Precautionary statements	P264, P264+P265, P280, P302+P352, P305+P351+P338, P321, P332+P317, P337+P317, P362+P364
- Except where otherwise noted, data are given for materials in their standard state (at 25 °C [77 °F], 100 kPa). verify (what is ?) Infobox references

Gluconic acid is an organic compound with molecular formula C_{6}H_{12}O_{7} and condensed structural formula HOCH_{2}(CHOH)_{4}CO_{2}H. A white solid, it forms the gluconate anion in neutral aqueous solution. The salts of gluconic acid are known as "gluconates". Gluconic acid, gluconate salts, and gluconate esters occur widely in nature because such species arise from the oxidation of glucose. Some drugs are injected in the form of gluconates.

== Chemical structure ==
The chemical structure of gluconic acid consists of a six-carbon chain, with five hydroxyl groups positioned in the same way as in the open-chained form of glucose, terminating in a carboxylic acid group. It is one of the 16 stereoisomers of 2,3,4,5,6-pentahydroxyhexanoic acid.

== Production ==
Gluconic acid is typically produced by the aerobic oxidation of glucose in the presence of the enzyme glucose oxidase. The conversion produces gluconolactone and hydrogen peroxide. The lactone spontaneously hydrolyzes to gluconic acid in water.

C_{6}H_{12}O_{6} + O_{2} → C_{6}H_{10}O_{6} + H_{2}O_{2}
C_{6}H_{10}O_{6} + H_{2}O → C_{6}H_{12}O_{7}

Variations of glucose (or other carbohydrate-containing substrate) oxidation using fermentation. or noble metal catalysis.

Gluconic acid was first prepared by Hlasiwetz and Habermann in 1870 and involved the chemical oxidation of glucose. In 1880, Boutroux prepared and isolated gluconic acid using the glucose fermentation.

=== Historical role in development of deep-tank fermentation ===
The production of gluconic acid by deep-tank fermentation (aerated, pH controlled, and stirred >1000 L tanks) of the filamentous fungi Aspergillus niger in 1929, for use as a food acidity regulator and cleaning agent, was the first successful use of deep-tank fermentation by Pfizer. This expertise later led to Pfizer's successful use of deep-tank fermentation of Penicillium fungi in February 1944, to rapidly scale up penicillin production, resulting in sufficient penicillin to treat the American and British battle casualties of the June 6, 1944 Allied D-Day invasion of World War II.

== Occurrence and uses ==
Gluconic acid occurs naturally in fruit, honey, and wine. As a food additive (E574), it is now known as an acidity regulator.

The gluconate anion chelates Ca^{2+}, Fe^{2+}, K^{+}, Al^{3+}, and other metals, including lanthanides and actinides. It is also used in cleaning products, where it dissolves mineral deposits, especially in alkaline solution.

Zinc gluconate injections are used to neuter male dogs.

Gluconate is also used in building and construction as a concrete admixture (retarder) to slow down the cement hydration reactions, and to delay the cement setting time. It allows for a longer time to lay the concrete, or to spread the cement hydration heat over a longer period of time to avoid too high a temperature and the resulting cracking. Retarders are mixed in to concrete when the weather temperature is high or to cast large and thick concrete slabs in successive and sufficiently well-mixed layers.

Gluconic acid aqueous solution finds application as a medium for organic synthesis.

=== Medicine ===
In medicine, gluconate is used most commonly as a biologically neutral carrier of Zn^{2+}, Ca^{2+}, Cu^{2+}, Fe^{2+}, and K^{+} to treat electrolyte imbalance.

Calcium gluconate, in the form of a gel, is used to treat burns from hydrofluoric acid; calcium gluconate injections may be used for more severe cases to avoid necrosis of deep tissues, as well as to treat hypocalcemia in hospitalized patients. Gluconate is also an electrolyte present in certain solutions, such as "plasmalyte a", used for intravenous fluid resuscitation. Quinine gluconate is a salt of gluconic acid and quinine, which is used for intramuscular injection in the treatment of malaria.

Ferrous gluconate injections have been proposed in the past to treat anemia.

== See also ==
- Uronic acid
- Glucuronic acid
- Isosaccharinic acid (ISA)
- 6-Phosphogluconic acid
