= Iduronic acid =

Names
- IUPAC name l-idopyranuronic acid
- Other names l-Iduronic acid, d-ido-Hexuronic acid, IdoA

Identifiers
CAS Number	2073-35-0 L-enantiomer; 3402-98-0 racemate
3D model (JSmol)	Interactive image
ChEBI	CHEBI:28481
ChemSpider	10051462
KEGG	C06472
MeSH	Iduronic+acid
PubChem CID	11877134
UNII	F5HD8XQ3DP
- InChI: InChI=1S/C6H10O7/c7-1-2(8)4(5(10)11)13-6(12)3(1)9/h1-4,6-9,12H,(H,10,11)/p-1/t1-,2-,3+,4+,6+/m0/s1 Key: AEMOLEFTQBMNLQ-VCSGLWQLSA-M; InChI=1/C6H10O7/c7-1-2(8)4(5(10)11)13-6(12)3(1)9/h1-4,6-9,12H,(H,10,11)/p-1/t1-,2-,3+,4+,6+/m0/s1 Key: AEMOLEFTQBMNLQ-QQSWGHAIBB
- SMILES: [O-]C(=O)[C@@H]1O[C@@H](O)[C@H](O)[C@@H](O)[C@@H]1O

Properties
Chemical formula	C_{6}H_{10}O_{7}
Molar mass	194.139 g/mol
Appearance	white solid
Melting point	131–132 °C (268–270 °F; 404–405 K)
- Except where otherwise noted, data are given for materials in their standard state (at 25 °C [77 °F], 100 kPa). verify (what is ?) Infobox references

l-Iduronic acid (IUPAC abbr.: IdoA) is the major uronic acid component of the glycosaminoglycans (GAGs) dermatan sulfate, and heparin. It is also present in heparan sulfate, although here in a minor amount relative to its carbon-5 epimer glucuronic acid.

IdoA is a pyranose sugar. Most pyranoses are stable in one of two chair conformations ^{1}C_{4} or ^{4}C_{1}. l-iduronate is different and adopts more than one solution conformation, with an equilibrium existing between three low-energy conformers. These are the ^{1}C_{4} and ^{4}C_{1} chair forms and an additional ^{2}S_{0} skew-boat conformation.

α-l-idopyranuronic acid

IdoA may be modified by the addition of an O-sulfate group at carbon position 2 to form 2-O-sulfo-l-iduronic acid (IdoA2S).

In 2000, LK Hallak described the importance of this sugar in respiratory syncytial virus (RSV) infection. Dermatan sulfate and heparan sulfate were the only GAGs containing IdoA, and they were the only ones that inhibited RSV infection in cell culture.

When internally positioned within an oligosaccharide, the ^{1}C_{4} and ^{2}S_{0} conformations (shown below for IdoA2S) predominate.

Proton NMR spectroscopy can be used to track changes in the balance of this equilibrium.

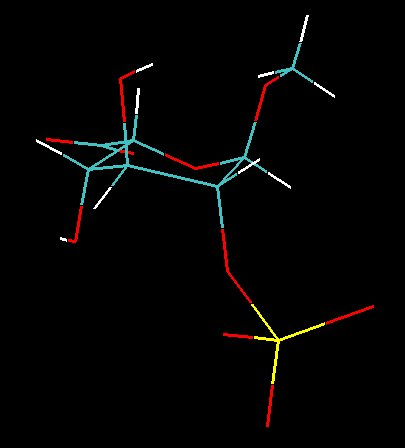
IdoA(2S)^{1}C_{4} conformation

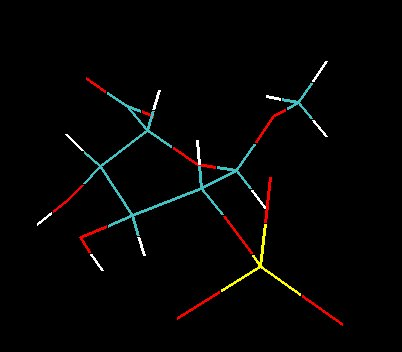
IdoA(2S)^{2}S_{0} conformation

Iduronic acid can be detected colorimetrically.

== See also ==
- Idose
