= C4H8O3 =

The molecular formula C_{4}H_{8}O_{3} may refer to:

- Hydroxybutyric acids:
  - 2-Hydroxybutyric acid (alpha-hydroxybutyric acid)
  - beta-Hydroxybutyric acid (3-hydroxybutyric acid)
  - gamma-Hydroxybutyric acid (4-hydroxybutyric acid, GHB)
- Hydroxyisobutyric acids
  - 2-Hydroxyisobutyric acid
  - 3-Hydroxyisobutyric acid
- Methyl lactate
