= C4H10O2 =

The molecular formula C_{4}H_{10}O_{2} may refer to:

- Butanediols
  - 1,2-Butanediol
  - 1,3-Butanediol
  - 1,4-Butanediol
  - 2,3-Butanediol
- tert-Butyl hydroperoxide
- Dimethoxyethane
- 2-Ethoxyethanol
- 1-Methoxy-2-propanol
- Diethyl peroxide
