= Butanediol =

Butanediol, also called butylene glycol, may refer to any one of four stable structural isomers:

- 1,2-Butanediol
- 1,3-Butanediol
- 1,4-Butanediol
- 2,3-Butanediol

== Geminal diols ==
There are also two geminal diols (gem-diols), which are less stable:

- 1,1-Butanediol, hydrate of butanal
- 2,2-Butanediol, hydrate of butanone

== Isobutylene glycol and methylpropanediol ==
Isobutylene glycol may be considered a kind of butylene glycol, similarly to butane historically including n-butane and i-butane (isobutane). The modern name for the closely related type of compounds is methylpropanediol. There are two stable structural isomers:

- 2-methylpropane-1,2-diol
- 2-methylpropane-1,3-diol

and one unstable geminal diol:

- 2-methylpropane-1,1-diol (not a glycol), hydrate of 2-methylpropanal (isobutyraldehyde)

These three methylpropanediols are structural isomers of butanediols. They are not chiral.

== Examples ==
2-Methylpropane-1,3-diol derivatives:

- Crisnatol, an experimental medication
- 2-Methyl-2-propyl-1,3-propanediol, medication precursor and active metabolite

== See also ==
- C_{4}H_{10}O_{2}
- Diol
  - Alkanediol
- Hydroxyl-substituted butanes
  - Butyl alcohol
  - Butanetriol
  - Butanetetrol (butanetetraol), including 4-carbon sugar alcohols
    - Erythritol
    - Threitol
