= BDH =

BDH is a three-letter abbreviation that may refer to:

- The AMEX code for ML BRDBND HLDR12/40 (a broadband diversification instrument).
- The National Rail station code for Bedhampton railway station, Havant, England
- Beta-hydroxyDeHydrogenase, enzyme that takes beta-Hydroxybutyric acid as a substrate
- Peace and Democracy Movement (Bariş ve Demokrasi Hareketi), a political party in the Turkish Republic of Northern Cyprus
- Big Children's Choir (Большой Детский Хор), one of the most popular children's choirs in the ex-USSR.
- The Brown Daily Herald, the student newspaper of Brown University
- British Drug Houses, a big chemical company that was merged with Merck KGaA
- Bryce Dallas Howard, actress in Jurassic World, The Village, Spider-Man 3, Terminator Salvation, and Twilight Saga: Eclipse, et al.
- Big Damn Heroes, characters and cast from the TV show Firefly and movie Serenity.
