= Hydroxybutanal =

Hydroxybutanal may refer to:

- 2-Hydroxybutanal
- 3-Hydroxybutanal, an aldol, formerly used in medicine as a hypnotic and sedative
- 4-Hydroxybutanal, a chemical intermediate

== See also ==
- Hydroxybutyraldehyde
