= Hydroxybutyrate-dimer hydrolase =

Class of enzymes

Identifiers
- EC no.: 3.1.1.22
- CAS no.: 37278-37-8

Databases
- BRENDA: enzyme data
- ExPASy: NiceZyme view
- KEGG: enzyme entry
- MetaCyc: metabolic pathway
- Rhea: reactions
- PDB structures: RCSB PDB PDBe PDBsum
- Gene Ontology: AmiGO / QuickGO
Search
- PMC: articles
- PubMed: articles
- NCBI: proteins

Hydroxybutyrate-dimer hydrolase (EC 3.1.1.22) is an enzyme that catalyzes the reaction

(R)-3-((R)-3-hydroxybutanoyloxy)butanoic acid
H_{2}O
2
(R)-3-hydroxybutyric acid

The enzyme characterised from Pseudomonas lemoignei hydrolyses a dimer of (R)-3-hydroxybutyric acid back to the monomer. The gene for this enzyme has been cloned for sequencing. The enzyme is also found in Zoogloea ramigera.

This enzyme is a hydrolase, specifically one acting on carboxylic ester bonds. The systematic name is (R)-3-((R)-3-hydroxybutanoyloxy)butanoate hydroxybutanoylhydrolase. The enzyme is also called D-(–)-3-hydroxybutyrate-dimer hydrolase.
