= 2-Hydroxybutyric acid =

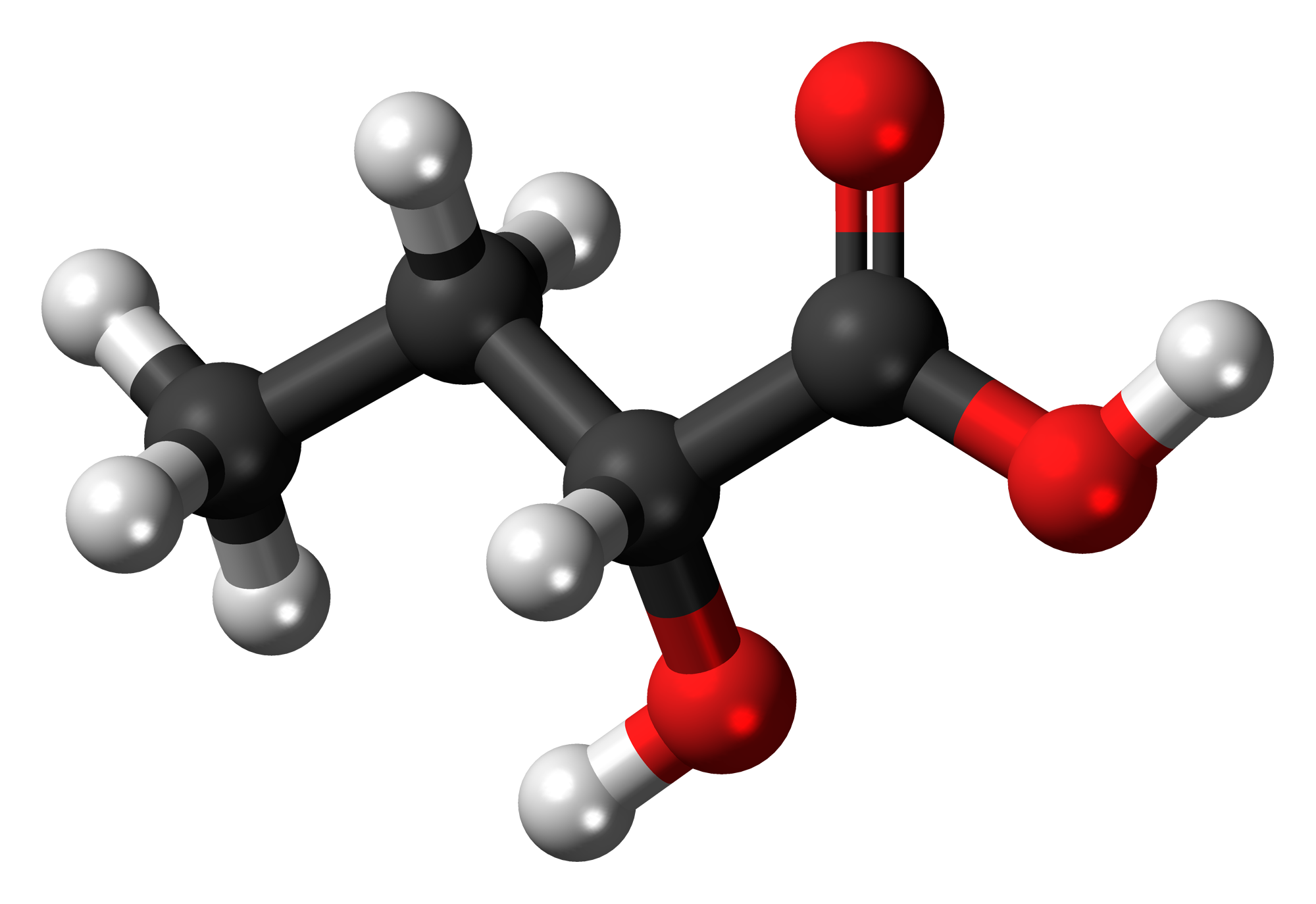

Names
- Preferred IUPAC name 2-Hydroxybutanoic acid
- Other names α-Hydroxybutyric acid

Identifiers
CAS Number	565-70-8
3D model (JSmol)	Interactive image; Interactive image
ChEBI	CHEBI:1148
ChEMBL	ChEMBL567588
ChemSpider	10792
ECHA InfoCard	100.009.079
KEGG	C05984
MeSH	2-hydroxybutyric+acid
PubChem CID	11266
UNII	O0ADR0I4H5
CompTox Dashboard (EPA)	DTXSID8041903
- InChI: InChI=1S/C4H8O3/c1-2-3(5)4(6)7/h3,5H,2H2,1H3,(H,6,7) Key: AFENDNXGAFYKQO-UHFFFAOYSA-N; InChI=1/C4H8O3/c1-2-3(5)4(6)7/h3,5H,2H2,1H3,(H,6,7) Key: AFENDNXGAFYKQO-UHFFFAOYAH
- SMILES: CCC(O)C(=O)O; O=C(O)C(O)CC

Properties
Chemical formula	C_{4}H_{8}O_{3}
Molar mass	104.105 g·mol^{−1}

Related compounds
Other anions	hydroxybutyrate
Related carboxylic acids	propionic acid lactic acid 3-hydroxypropionic acid malonic acid butyric acid hydroxypentanoic acid
Related compounds	erythrose threose 1,2-butanediol 1,3-butanediol 2,3-butanediol 1,4-butanediol
- Except where otherwise noted, data are given for materials in their standard state (at 25 °C [77 °F], 100 kPa). verify (what is ?) Infobox references

2-Hydroxybutyric acid, is a hydroxybutyric acid with the hydroxyl group on the carbon adjacent to the carboxyl. It is a chiral compound having two enantiomers, D-2-hydroxybutyric acid and L-2-hydroxybutyric acid. Its conjugate base is known as alpha-hydroxybutyrate and α-hydroxybutyrate.

d-2-hydroxybutyric acid

l-2-hydroxybutyric acid

2-Hydroxybutyrate, the conjugate base of 2-hydroxybutyric acid, is produced in mammalian tissues (principally hepatic) that catabolize L-threonine or synthesize glutathione. Oxidative stress or detoxification demands can dramatically increase the rate of hepatic glutathione synthesis. Under such metabolic stress conditions, supplies of L-cysteine for glutathione synthesis become limiting, so homocysteine is diverted from the transmethylation pathway forming methionine into the transsulfuration pathway forming cystathionine. 2-Hydroxybutyrate is released as a byproduct when cystathionine is cleaved to cysteine that is incorporated into glutathione. Chronic shifts in the rate of glutathione synthesis may be reflected by urinary excretion of 2-hydroxybutyrate.

α-hydroxybutyrate may be useful as an early indicator of insulin resistance in non-diabetic subjects. Moreover, elevated serum α-hydroxybutyrate predicts worsening glucose tolerance.
