= Mahdi Abu-Omar =

Palestinian American chemist (born 1970)

Mahdi Muhammad Abu-Omar (born October 18, 1970, in Jerusalem) is a Palestinian-American chemist, currently the Duncan and Suzanne Mellichamp Professor of Green Chemistry in the Departments of Chemistry & Biochemistry and Chemical Engineering at University of California, Santa Barbara.

== Bio and career ==
Mahdi was born in Jerusalem and completed his high school education at St. George's before immigrating to the U.S. Abu-Omar received a B.S. in chemistry from Hampden-Sydney College, Virginia, in 1992. He began his scientific research in Inorganic and Organometallic Chemistry at Iowa State University, where he earned his Ph.D. in 1996 under Professor James H. Espenson. His doctoral thesis described the kinetics and mechanisms of oxygen atom transfer reactions of methyltrioxorhenium (MTO). Following that, Abu-Omar spent a year as an NIH Postdoctoral Scholar at Caltech with Professor Harry B. Gray, studying long range electron-transfer in rhenium-modified metalloproteins.

Mahdi started his independent academic career as an assistant professor at UCLA, moved to Purdue University in 2004, was appointed R. B. Wetherill Professor of Chemistry and Chemical Engineering at Purdue University in 2013, and moved back to California in 2016, where he currently holds the Mellichamp Chair in green chemistry at UCSB.

== Research ==
Abu-Omar's interdisciplinary research addresses fundamental problems in energy science, sustainability, and green chemistry at the interface of inorganic chemistry and catalysis. Much of modern life materials are based on nonrenewable petroleum. Over the past decade the Abu-Omar research group contributed to biomass conversion and bio-inspired chemistry by discovering and developing new transformations that provide access to new molecules that are precursors to renewable materials and fuels. A unifying theme for much of Abu-Omar's research is the combination of synthetic chemistry with detailed mechanistic investigations through chemical kinetics.

Abu-Omar has authored more than 150 original research articles in scientific journals, and supervised 35 Ph.D. students as well as several postdoctoral scholars. Among Mahdi's research contributions are the discovery of catalytic perchlorate remediation, the conversion of lignin from intact biomass to aromatic chemicals and introduction of a new biorefinery concept known as lignin-first, discovery of rhenium-catalyzed H2-driven deoxydehydration (DODH) of biomass-derived polyols, the development of bio-inspired catalysts for on-demand production of chlorine dioxide in water under ambient temperature, pressure and neutral pH, and development of kinetic methods for the study of olefin polymerization catalysts.

== Awards and honors ==
- Faculty Early Career Development Award (CAREER), NSF, 1999.
- Beckman Young Investigator Award, Beckman Foundation, 1999.
- Fulbright Fellow, US-Israel Education Foundation, 2008.
- JPP Young Investigator Award, Society of Porphyrins and Phthalocyanines, 2010.
- Fellow of the American Association for the Advancement of Science, 2012.
- Crano Memorial Lecturer, ACS Akron Section, OH, 2013.
