= C4H8O =

The molecular formula C_{4}H_{8}O may refer to:

- Butanone
- Butyraldehyde
- Crotyl alcohol
- Cyclobutanol
- 1,2-Epoxybutane
- 2,3-Epoxybutane
- Ethyl vinyl ether
- Isobutyraldehyde
- 2-Methoxypropene
- Tetrahydrofuran
