= Hydroxybutyraldehyde =

Hydroxybutyraldehyde may refer to:

- 3-Hydroxybutyraldehyde (acetaldol), an aldol, formally the product of the dimerization of acetaldehyde
- 4-Hydroxybutyraldehyde, a chemical intermediate

== See also ==
- Hydroxybutanal
