= Hydroxyisobutyric acid =

Hydroxyisobutyric acid may refer to:

- 2-Hydroxyisobutyric acid
- 3-Hydroxyisobutyric acid
