= Ethyl methacrylate =

Organic compound

Names
- Preferred IUPAC name Ethyl 2-methylprop-2-enoate
- Other names Ethyl 2-methylpropenoate, Acryester E, Acryester BMA

Identifiers
CAS Number	97-63-2
3D model (JSmol)	Interactive image
ChEMBL	ChEMBL3182984
ChemSpider	7066
ECHA InfoCard	100.002.362
EC Number	202-597-5
PubChem CID	7343
RTECS number	OZ4550000
UNII	80F70CLT4O
UN number	2277
CompTox Dashboard (EPA)	DTXSID1025308
- InChI: InChI=1S/C6H10O2/c1-4-8-6(7)5(2)3/h2,4H2,1,3H3 Key: SUPCQIBBMFXVTL-UHFFFAOYSA-N
- SMILES: CCOC(=O)C(=C)C

Properties
Chemical formula	C_{6}H_{10}O_{2}
Molar mass	114.144 g·mol^{−1}
Appearance	Colorless liquid
Density	0.9135 g/cm^{3}
Boiling point	117 °C (243 °F; 390 K)

Hazards
- GHS labelling
Pictograms	(GHS02: Flammable) (GHS07: Exclamation mark)
Signal word	Warning
Hazard statements	H225, H315, H317, H319, H335
Precautionary statements	P210, P233, P240, P241, P242, P243, P261, P264, P271, P272, P280, P302+P352, P303+P361+P353, P304+P340, P305+P351+P338, P312, P321, P332+P313, P333+P313, P337+P313, P362, P363, P370+P378, P403+P233, P403+P235, P405, P501
NFPA 704 (fire diamond)	2 3 2
- Except where otherwise noted, data are given for materials in their standard state (at 25 °C [77 °F], 100 kPa). Infobox references

Ethyl methacrylate is the organic compound with the formula C_{2}H_{5}O_{2}CC(CH_{3})=CH_{2}. A colorless liquid, it is a common monomer for the preparation of acrylate polymers. It is typically polymerized under free-radical conditions.

Ethyl methacrylate was first obtained by treating ethyl 2-hydroxyisobutyrate with phosphorus pentachloride in a dehydration reaction.

== Environmental issues and health hazards ==
The related methyl and butyl methacrylates have respective acute LD_{50}s of 10 and 20 g/kg (oral, rat); a linear extrapolation suggests that ethyl methacrylate would have an LD_{50} of approximately 13 g/kg.

Acrylate esters irritate the eyes and can cause blindness.

== See also ==
- Methyl methacrylate
- Butyl methacrylate
