= Hydroxybutyric acid =

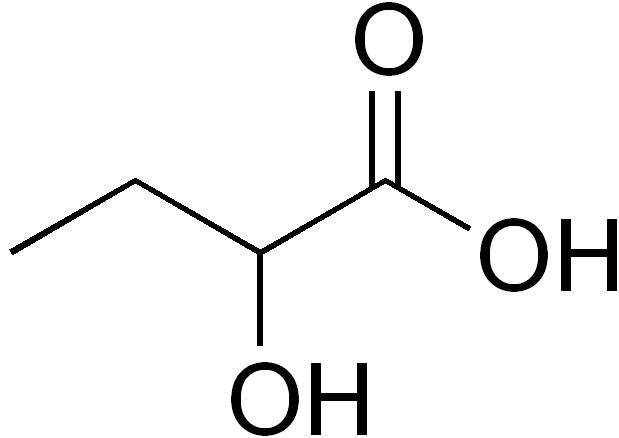
Skeletal formula of α-hydroxybutyric acid

Skeletal formula of β-hydroxybutyric acid

Skeletal formula of γ-hydroxybutyric acid

Skeletal formula of 2-hydroxyisobutyric acid

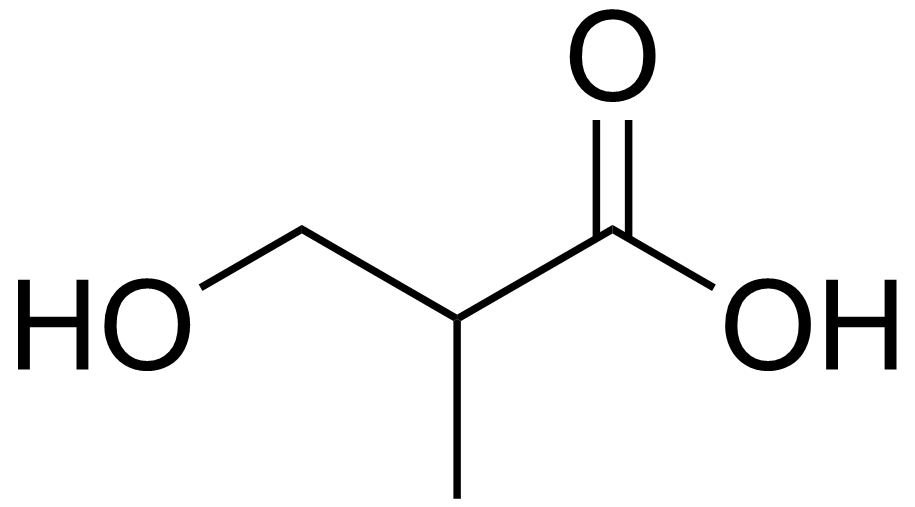
Skeletal formula of 3-hydroxyisobutyric acid

The Hydroxybutyric acids form a group of four-carbon organic compounds that have both hydroxy and carboxylic acid functional groups. They can be viewed as derivatives of butyric acid. The carboxylate anion and the esters of hydroxybutyric acids are known as hydroxybutyrates. β-hydroxybutyric acid is relevant to human health as it is a member of a class of products of fatty acid oxidation referred to as ketone bodies.

The isomers are distinguished by the distance between the two functional groups and the branching.

- alpha-Hydroxybutyric acid (2-Hydroxybutyric acid)
- beta-Hydroxybutyric acid (3-Hydroxybutyric acid)
- gamma-Hydroxybutyric acid (4-Hydroxybutyric acid, GHB)
- 2-Hydroxyisobutyric acid
- 3-Hydroxyisobutyric acid

== See also ==
- beta-Hydroxy beta-methylbutyric acid
- Sodium oxybate
