= BDH1 =

Protein-coding gene in the species Homo sapiens

Identifiers
- Aliases: BDH1, BDH, SDR9C1, 3-hydroxybutyrate dehydrogenase, type 1, 3-hydroxybutyrate dehydrogenase 1
- External IDs: OMIM: 603063; MGI: 1919161; GeneCards: BDH1
Enzyme activity
EC #	BRENDA	ExPASy	KEGG	MetaCyc
1.1.1.30	↗	↗	↗	↗

Gene location (Human)
Chr.	Chromosome 3 (human)
Band	3q29	Start	197,509,783 bp
Band	3q29	End	197,573,323 bp

Gene location (Mouse)
Chr.	Chromosome 16 (mouse)
Band	16|16 B2	Start	31,241,098 bp
Band	16|16 B2	End	31,277,719 bp
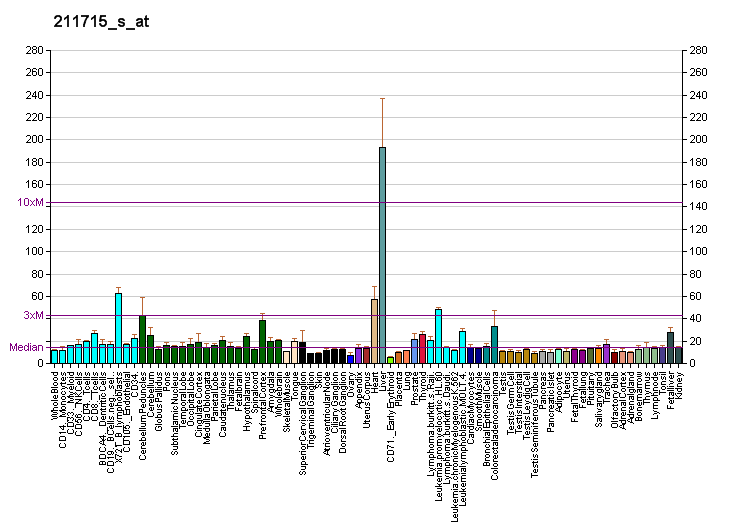
RNA expression pattern
Bgee	Human / Mouse (ortholog); Top expressed in: right lobe of liver; mucosa of transverse colon; cerebellar hemisphere; right hemisphere of cerebellum; rectum; duodenum; right frontal lobe; olfactory zone of nasal mucosa; apex of heart; left ventricle / Top expressed in: epithelium of small intestine; interventricular septum; left lobe of liver; myocardium of ventricle; right ventricle; soleus muscle; human kidney; ileum; migratory enteric neural crest cell; extraocular muscle; More reference expression data
BioGPS	More reference expression data
Gene ontology
Molecular function	catalytic activity; 3-hydroxybutyrate dehydrogenase activity; oxidoreductase activity
Cellular component	nucleoplasm; mitochondrial matrix; mitochondrion; mitochondrial inner membrane; membrane; matrix side of mitochondrial inner membrane
Biological process	ketone body biosynthetic process; ketone body catabolic process; metabolism
Sources:Amigo / QuickGO
Orthologs
Databases	NCBI: entry; OMA: entry
Species	Human	Mouse
Entrez	622	71911
Ensembl	ENSG00000161267; ENSG00000275544	ENSMUSG00000046598
UniProt	Q02338	Q80XN0
RefSeq (mRNA)	NM_004051; NM_203314; NM_203315	NM_001122683; NM_175177
RefSeq (protein)	NP_004042; NP_976059; NP_976060	NP_001116155; NP_780386
Location (UCSC)	Chr 3: 197.51 – 197.57 Mb	Chr 16: 31.24 – 31.28 Mb
PubMed search
- Wikidata
View/Edit Human	View/Edit Mouse

D-beta-hydroxybutyrate dehydrogenase, mitochondrial is an enzyme that in humans is encoded by the BDH1 gene.

This gene encodes a member of the short-chain dehydrogenase/reductase gene family. The encoded protein forms a homotetrameric lipid-requiring enzyme of the mitochondrial membrane and has a specific requirement for phosphatidylcholine for optimal enzymatic activity. The encoded protein catalyzes the interconversion of acetoacetate and (R)-3-hydroxybutyrate, the two major ketone bodies produced during fatty acid catabolism. Alternatively spliced transcript variants encoding the same protein have been described.

== See also ==
- 3-hydroxybutyrate dehydrogenase
