= Glyceryl-tris-3-hydroxybutyrate =

Names
- IUPAC name 2,3-bis(3-hydroxybutanoyloxy)propyl 3-hydroxybutanoate
- Other names Triacylglycerol of 3-hydroxybutyrate; Glyceryl tris (3-hydroxybutyrate); Glycerol-tri-3-hydroxybutyrate; Tris(3-hydroxybutyrin) glyceride; 3GHB; G3HB; Neuridan; TriKeto 3BHB; 3BHB

Identifiers
3D model (JSmol)	Interactive image
PubChem CID	21470345
- InChI: InChI=1S/C15H26O9/c1-9(16)4-13(19)22-7-12(24-15(21)6-11(3)18)8-23-14(20)5-10(2)17/h9-12,16-18H,4-8H2,1-3H3 Key: NHEUWFPWBFBDRF-UHFFFAOYSA-N
- SMILES: CC(CC(=O)OCC(COC(=O)CC(C)O)OC(=O)CC(C)O)O

Properties
Chemical formula	C_{15}H_{26}O_{9}
Molar mass	350.364 g·mol^{−1}

Pharmacology
Drug class	Triglyceride; Ketone ester; Histone deacetylase inhibitor
- Except where otherwise noted, data are given for materials in their standard state (at 25 °C [77 °F], 100 kPa). Infobox references

Glyceryl-tris-3-hydroxybutyrate (3GHB), sold under brand names like Neuridan and TriKeto 3BHB, is a triglyceride and ketone ester and the glycerol triester of the short-chain fatty acid and ketone body β-hydroxybutyric acid (β-hydroxybutyrate; BHB; 3-hydroxybutyrate). It is slowly metabolized and converted into BHB in the body. Ketone esters like 3GHB can induce rapid, significant, and sustained ketosis with oral administration and are an alternative to the ketogenic diet and fasting for achieving ketosis. They are able to overcome the pharmacokinetic limitations of exogenous ketone bodies, such as BHB's extremely rapid metabolism and short elimination half-life.

3GHB is a water-soluble triglyceride and has been investigated for potential use in parenteral nutrition. It shows dose-dependent neuroprotective effects against MPTP-induced dopaminergic neurotoxicity in rodents. It was suggested that this might be mediated by histone deacetylase (HDAC) inhibition. There has been interest in 3GHB in the potential treatment of neurological conditions such as epilepsy, Parkinson's disease, Alzheimer's disease, and traumatic brain injury. 3GHB has been patented for various uses. The clinical pharmacokinetics of 3GHB are being studied.

== See also ==
- Medical food
- 1,2,3-Tris(4-hydroxybutyroyloxy)propane
- β-Hydroxybutyrate (BHB)
- Tributyrin
