= Benzoylacetone =

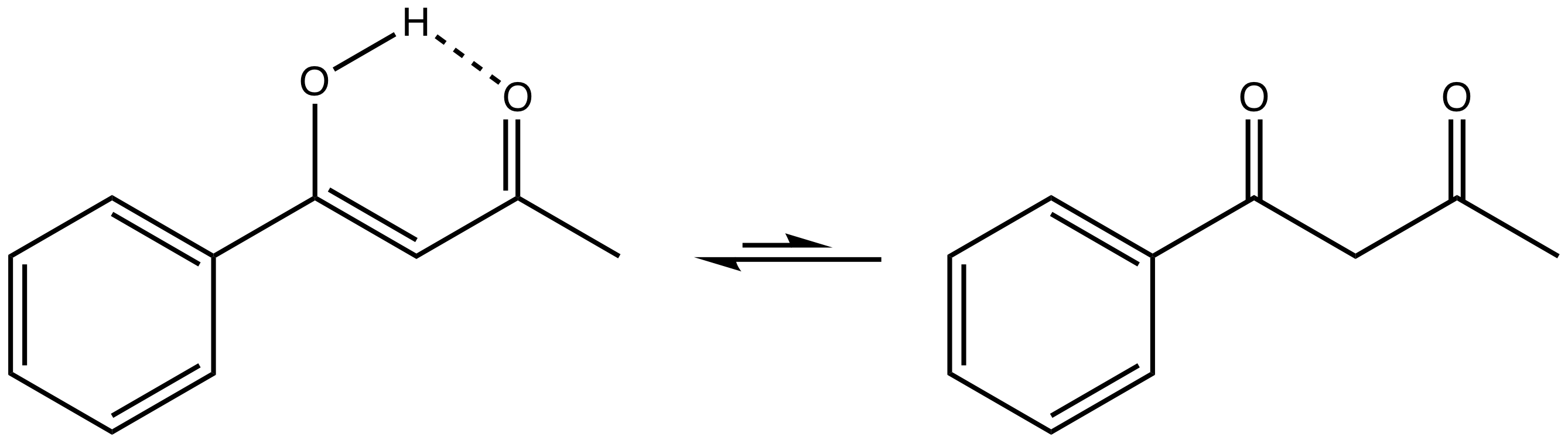

Names
- IUPAC name 1-phenylbutane-1,3-dione

Identifiers
CAS Number	93-91-4
3D model (JSmol)	Interactive image
ChEMBL	ChEMBL3186793
ChemSpider	6898
ECHA InfoCard	100.002.080
EC Number	202-286-4
PubChem CID	7166
UNII	I3RUV8U115
CompTox Dashboard (EPA)	DTXSID3021803
- InChI: InChI=1S/C10H10O2/c1-8(11)7-10(12)9-5-3-2-4-6-9/h2-6H,7H2,1H3 Key: CVBUKMMMRLOKQR-UHFFFAOYSA-N
- SMILES: CC(=O)CC(=O)C1=CC=CC=C1

Properties
Chemical formula	C_{10}H_{10}O_{2}
Molar mass	162.188 g·mol^{−1}
Density	1.0599 g/cm^{3}
Melting point	56 °C (133 °F; 329 K)
Boiling point	261.5 °C (502.7 °F; 534.6 K)

Hazards
- GHS labelling
Pictograms	(GHS07: Exclamation mark)
Signal word	Warning
Hazard statements	H315, H319, H335
Precautionary statements	P261, P264, P271, P280, P302+P352, P304+P340, P305+P351+P338, P312, P321, P332+P313, P337+P313, P362, P403+P233, P405, P501
- Except where otherwise noted, data are given for materials in their standard state (at 25 °C [77 °F], 100 kPa). Infobox references

Benzoylacetone is the organic compound with the nominal formula C_{6}H_{5}C(O)CH_{2}C(O)CH_{3}. As a 1,3-dicarbonyl, it is a precursor to many heterocycles, such as pyrazoles. It exists predominantly as the enol tautomer C_{6}H_{5}C(OH)=CHC(O)CH_{3}. Its conjugate base (pK_{a}=8.7) forms stable complexes with transition metals and lanthanides.
