= Alkanediol =

Example of a 1,2-diol (Ethyleneglycol, top), a 1,3-diol (1,3-Propanediol, middle) and a 1,4-diol (1,4-Butanediol, bottom).

Alkanediol refers to a class of organic compounds composed of an alkane and two (and only two) hydroxy groups (OH). "Alkane" is a type of hydrocarbon containing no cyclic carbon structures and only carbon-carbon single bonds, meaning only linear or branched carbon chains; alkanes are also completely saturated, meaning that all carbon bonding positions which are not carbon-carbon bonds are occupied by hydrogen. Chemical compounds containing two and only two hydroxy groups are referred to diols as a class.
