= Crisnatol =

Chemical compound

Clinical data
- ATC code: none

Identifiers
- IUPAC name: 2-(Chrysen-6-ylmethylamino)-2-methylpropane-1,3-diol
- CAS Number: 96389-68-3
- PubChem CID: 57062
- ChemSpider: 51449
- UNII: 2J71UR51UE
- CompTox Dashboard (EPA): DTXSID10242217

Chemical and physical data
- Formula: C_{23}H_{23}NO_{2}
- Molar mass: 345.442 g·mol^{−1}
- 3D model (JSmol): Interactive image
- SMILES: CC(CO)(CO)NCc1cc2c3ccccc3ccc2c4c1cccc4
- InChI: InChI=InChI=1S/C23H23NO2/c1-23(14-25,15-26)24-13-17-12-22-18-7-3-2-6-16(18)10-11-21(22)20-9-5-4-8-19(17)20/h2-12,24-26H,13-15H2,1H3; Key:SBRXTSOCZITGQG-UHFFFAOYSA-N

Crisnatol (BW-A770U) is an experimental anticancer agent known for its potential in inhibiting the growth of various solid tumors. Research has indicated that crisnatol acts as a DNA-intercalating agent, thereby disrupting the replication process in cancer cells. A Phase I clinical trial was conducted to assess its safety profile, pharmacokinetics, and potential efficacy in patients with solid malignancies. This study highlighted the drug's ability to inhibit tumor growth, although associated toxicities were observed, necessitating further research to optimize its therapeutic window.

== Mechanism of action ==
Crisnatol is a synthetic aromatic amine and a potent anticancer compound. It functions by intercalating into DNA and inhibiting topoisomerase activity, which leads to DNA damage and prevents cancer cells from proliferating. It primarily targets solid tumors and shows a higher affinity for melanoma and glioma cells. Due to its lipophilic properties, crisnatol can effectively penetrate the blood-brain barrier, making it a potential treatment for brain tumors.

== Clinical trials ==
Crisnatol has undergone several Phase I and II clinical trials aimed at determining its pharmacokinetics, safety profile, and efficacy against various types of solid tumors. Early studies demonstrated dose-limiting toxicities, primarily neurotoxicity and hematologic toxicity, which necessitated further research to optimize dosing schedules. In one Phase I trial, crisnatol mesylate was administered as a protracted infusion in patients with advanced solid malignancies, revealing a manageable toxicity profile and some evidence of tumor regression.

More recent trials have explored combinations of crisnatol with other anticancer agents, such as cisplatin, to enhance its efficacy and minimize resistance.

== Potential applications and challenges ==
Despite its promise, crisnatol faces challenges due to its side effects, which include neurotoxicity and dose-limiting hematologic toxicities. Research continues to focus on optimizing its therapeutic index and exploring potential applications in combination therapies. The ability of crisnatol to cross the blood-brain barrier has led to interest in its use against brain cancers, although further studies are needed to fully establish its efficacy and safety in this context.
