= 1,2-Butanediol =

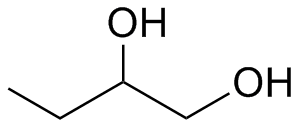
- Molecular formula of 1,2-Butanediol

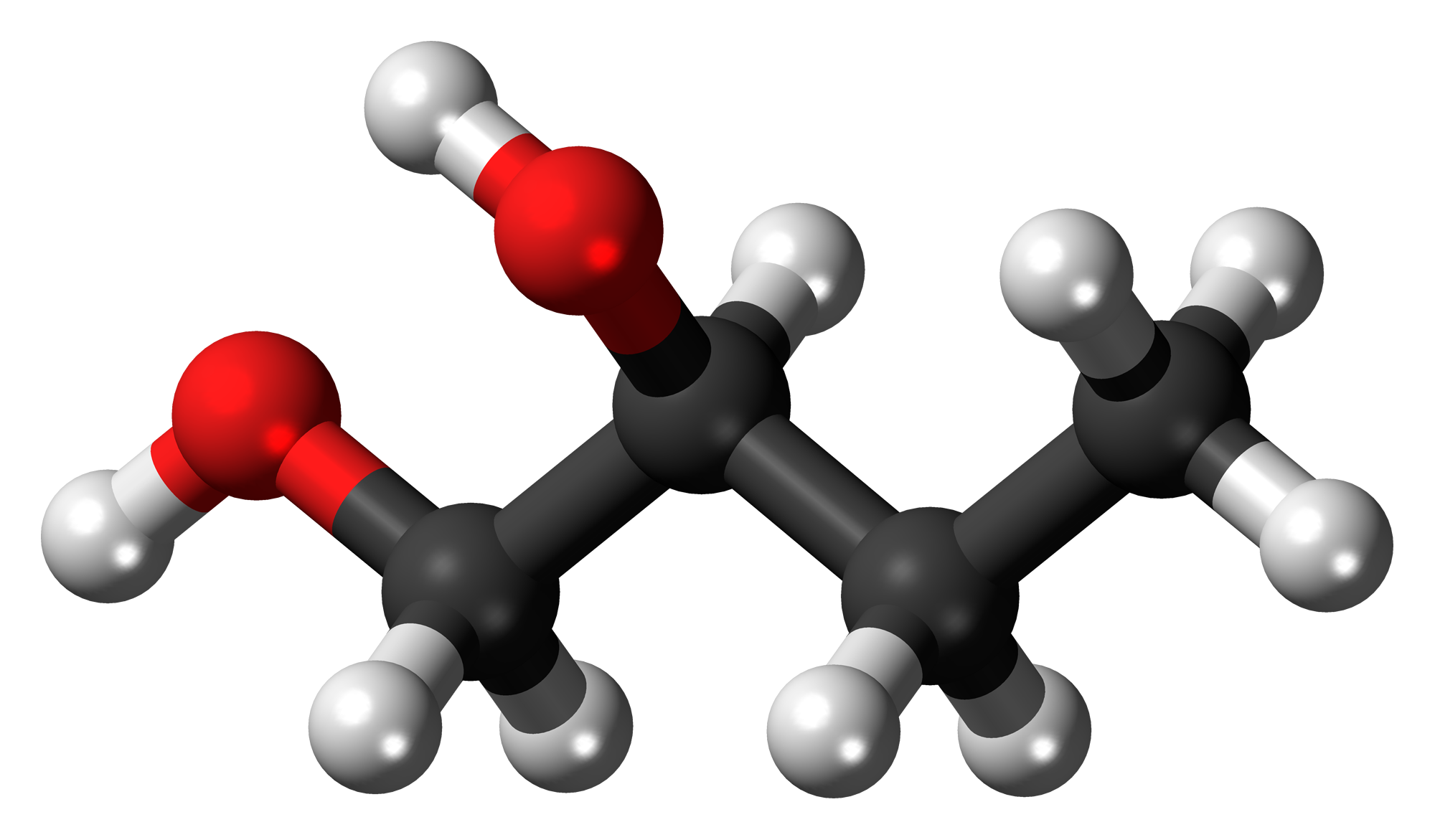

Names
- Preferred IUPAC name Butane-1,2-diol
- Other names 1,2-Dihydroxybutane α-Butylene glycol

Identifiers
CAS Number	584-03-2; 40348-66-1 (R); 73522-17-5 (S)
3D model (JSmol)	Interactive image; Interactive image
ChEBI	CHEBI:52682
ChemSpider	10948
ECHA InfoCard	100.008.663
EC Number	209-527-2
PubChem CID	11429
RTECS number	EK0380000
UNII	RUN0H01QEU
CompTox Dashboard (EPA)	DTXSID6040375
- InChI: InChI=1S/C4H10O2/c1-2-4(6)3-5/h4-6H,2-3H2,1H3 Key: BMRWNKZVCUKKSR-UHFFFAOYSA-N; InChI=1/C4H10O2/c1-2-4(6)3-5/h4-6H,2-3H2,1H3 Key: BMRWNKZVCUKKSR-UHFFFAOYAV
- SMILES: OCC(O)CC; CCC(CO)O

Properties
Chemical formula	C_{4}H_{10}O_{2}
Molar mass	90.121 g/mol
Density	1.0023 g/cm^{3} (20 °C)
Melting point	−50 °C (−58 °F; 223 K) (Note: The value of −50 °C for the melting point is taken from Ullmann's Encyclopedia of Industrial Chemistry and used by the Hazardous Substances Data Bank and the OECD Screening Information Dataset. Other reported values of the melting point range from −114 °C to −30 °C.)
Boiling point	195 to 196.9 °C (383.0 to 386.4 °F; 468.1 to 470.0 K) (96.5 °C at 10 mmHg)
Solubility in water	miscible
Solubility	soluble in ethanol, acetone; sparingly soluble in esters and ethers; insoluble in hydrocarbons
Refractive index (n_{D})	1.4378 (20 °C)
Viscosity	7.3 mPa·s (20 °C)

Thermochemistry
Std enthalpy of formation (Δ_{f}H^{⦵}_{298})	−532.8 kJ/mol
Std enthalpy of combustion (Δ_{c}H^{⦵}_{298})	−2479 kJ/mol

Hazards
Flash point	90 °C (194 °F; 363 K)
Safety data sheet (SDS)	ICSC 0395

Related compounds
Related butanediols	1,3-Butanediol; 1,4-Butanediol; 2,3-Butanediol
Related compounds	Ethylene glycol Propylene glycol 2-Hydroxybutyraldehyde; 2-Hydroxybutyric acid α-Ketobutyric acid
- Except where otherwise noted, data are given for materials in their standard state (at 25 °C [77 °F], 100 kPa). verify (what is ?) Infobox references

1,2-Butanediol is the organic compound with the formula HOCH_{2}(HO)CHCH_{2}CH_{3}. It is classified as a vic-diol (glycol). It is chiral, although typically it is encountered as the racemic mixture. It is a colorless liquid.

== Preparation ==
This diol was first described by Charles-Adolphe Wurtz in 1859.

It is produced industrially by hydration of 1,2-epoxybutane.

This process requires a ten- to twenty-fold excess of water to suppress the formation of polyethers. Depending on the amount of excess water, the selectivity varies from 70 to 92%. Sulfuric acid or strongly acidic ion exchange resins may be used as catalysts, which allows the reaction to occur under 160 °C and at slightly above atmospheric pressure.

1,2-Butanediol is a byproduct of the production of 1,4-butanediol from butadiene. It is also a byproduct of the catalytic hydrocracking of starches and sugars such as sorbitol to ethylene glycol and propylene glycol.

It can also be obtained from the dihydroxylation of but-1-ene by OsO_{4}.

== Applications ==
It has been patented for the production of polyester resins and plasticizers. It is a potential feedstock for the industrial production of α-ketobutyric acid, a precursor to some amino acids.

== Safety ==
The LD_{50} (rats, oral) is 16g/kg.
