= 3-Hydroxybutyrate dehydrogenase =

Enzyme

Identifiers
- EC no.: 1.1.1.30
- CAS no.: 9028-38-0

Databases
- BRENDA: enzyme data
- ExPASy: NiceZyme view
- KEGG: enzyme entry
- MetaCyc: metabolic pathway
- Rhea: reactions
- PDB structures: RCSB PDB PDBe PDBsum
- Gene Ontology: AmiGO / QuickGO
Search
- PMC: articles
- PubMed: articles
- NCBI: proteins

In enzymology, 3-hydroxybutyrate dehydrogenase (EC 1.1.1.30) is an enzyme that catalyzes the chemical reaction:

(R)-3-Hydroxybutyric acid
+ NAD^{+}
H^{+}
H^{+}
Acetoacetic acid
+ NADH

The two substrates of this enzyme are (R)-3-hydroxybutyric acid and oxidised nicotinamide adenine dinucleotide (NAD^{+}}. Its products are acetoacetic acid, reducad NADH, and a proton. This enzyme belongs to the family of oxidoreductases, to be specific, those acting on the CH-OH group of donor with NAD^{+} or NADP^{+} as acceptor.

In humans, BDH1 and possibly BDH2 catalyze this type of reaction, though the latter is likely physiologically irrelevant due to low affinity.

This enzyme participates in the synthesis and degradation of ketone bodies and the metabolism of butyric acid.

== Classification ==
This enzyme has a classification number of EC 1.1.1.30. The first digit means that this enzyme is an oxidoreductase which means the purpose is to catalyze oxidation and reduction reaction pathways. The following two 1s indicate the subclass and sub-sub of the enzyme. In this case, 1.1.1 means this enzyme is an oxidoreductase that acts on the CH-OH group of the donor molecule using NAD(+) or NADP(+) as the acceptor. The 4th number, or 30 in this case, is the serial number of the enzyme to define it within its sub-subclass. 3-Hydroxybutryate dehydrogenase is also known as beta-hydroxybutyric dehydrogenase and is abbreviated BHBDH. Other common synonyms are shown below.

The systematic name of this enzyme class is (R)-3-hydroxybutanoate:NAD^{+} oxidoreductase. Other names in common use include:

- NAD^{+}-β-hydroxybutyrate dehydrogenase
- hydroxybutyrate oxidoreductase
- β-hydroxybutyrate dehydrogenase
- D-β-hydroxybutyrate dehydrogenase
- D-3-hydroxybutyrate dehydrogenase
- D-(−)-3-hydroxybutyrate dehydrogenase
- β-hydroxybutyric acid dehydrogenase
- 3-D-hydroxybutyrate dehydrogenase
- β-hydroxybutyric dehydrogenase

== Reaction mechanism ==
BHBDH is found in the mitochondria and catalyzes the oxidation of 3-hydroxybutyyrate to acetoacetate and it uses NAD as a coenzyme. The reaction is shown below and as denoted by the formula it is reversible. As outlined in the reaction formula, this enzyme catalyzes the reaction of (R)-3-hydroxybutanoate and NAD+ into acetoacetate into NADH and a free H+.

(R)-3-hydroxybutanoate + NAD^{+} $\rightleftharpoons$ acetoacetate + NADH + H^{+}

The first step in the reaction is the substrate binding and this occurs by the carboxylate group of the substrate binding to the carboxylate group of the acetate part of the enzyme. Then the C3 atom from the substrate will form a hydrogen bond with the C4 atom of NAD+. Then when the reaction is occurring at the optimum pH a proton is removed from the hydroxyl group of the substrate and this allows for a carbonyl-bond to form. Simultaneously, the negative hydrogen ion on the C3 atom of the enzyme is transferred to the C4 atom on NAD+ and thus forming acetoacetate and NADH.

== Species distribution ==
BHBDH is found in dogfish sharks (Squalus acanthias) rectal glands and has been found to have a large increase in activity in activity after feeding. The largest and most significant peak of BHBDH activity occurred 4–8 hours in the rectal glands of the sharks. Besides dogfish, this enzyme is found in a large range of organisms all the way from unicellular organisms to higher order primates such as humans. In humans, this enzyme is used medically in diabetes patients to detect ketone bodies which are associated with diabetic ketoacidosis. This is by no means an exhaustive list of organisms where BHBDH is found, these organisms are merely some of the common examples of this enzyme in action.

== Function ==
In the dogfish shark, the main function of BHBDH is to help with the breakdown of ketone bodies in the cells. This function is supported by experimental evidence of starved dogfish sharks after they are fed. When starved, the ketone levels in the shark bodies increases, especially after long-term starvation. Once they are fed, the presence of ketone bodies in the body declines rapidly. The rapid decline is correlated with significant elevations of BHBDH activity, which points towards this enzyme being very important to process ketone bodies.

== Structure ==
There are currently 2 published crystal structures of BHBDH which are shown below and available on the following links.

Both structures consist of 1 sheet, 5 beta alpha beta units, 7 strands, 9 beta turns and 1 gamma turn. The two structures differ in the number of helices and helix-helix interacs. In the left structure there are 13 helices and 8 helix-helix interacs. In the right structure there are 12 helices and 6 helix-helix interacs. Both structures have C_{2}H_{6}AsO_{2} ligands. Both structures have magnesium ions on them, but they differ again on interactions involving the metal. For the left structure there is an MG301(A) group while on the right structure there is a 1301(A) group (6,7). The links in the captions of the photo provide a website with more information on these enzymes. They also provide a rotational 3D structure to examine all angles of the known structures. Please visit them for additional information.

== Active site ==
The active site of the second structure has 2 tunnels, one with a radius of 1.21 Å and one with a radius of 1.19 Å. The 1.21 Å tunnel has a length of 26.7 Å and the 1.19 Å tunnel has a length of 27.5 Å. The active site of the first version has one tunnel that has a radius of 1.14 Å and a length of 26.0 Å. As with the structures, these parts of the enzyme can be examined further using the links in the caption.

== See also ==
- BDH1
