= Β-Hydroxybutyric acid =

β-Hydroxybutyric acid

Names
- Preferred IUPAC name 3-Hydroxybutanoic acid

Identifiers
CAS Number	300-85-6
3D model (JSmol)	Interactive image; Interactive image
Beilstein Reference	773861
ChEBI	CHEBI:20067
ChEMBL	ChEMBL1162496
ChemSpider	428
ECHA InfoCard	100.005.546
IUPHAR/BPS	1593
KEGG	C01089
MeSH	beta-Hydroxybutyrate
PubChem CID	441
UNII	TZP1275679
CompTox Dashboard (EPA)	DTXSID60859511
- InChI: InChI=1S/C4H8O3/c1-3(5)2-4(6)7/h3,5H,2H2,1H3,(H,6,7) Key: WHBMMWSBFZVSSR-UHFFFAOYSA-N; InChI=1/C4H8O3/c1-3(5)2-4(6)7/h3,5H,2H2,1H3,(H,6,7) Key: WHBMMWSBFZVSSR-UHFFFAOYAO
- SMILES: O=C(O)CC(O)C; CC(CC(=O)O)O

Properties
Chemical formula	C_{4}H_{8}O_{3}
Molar mass	104.105 g·mol^{−1}
Appearance	white solid
Melting point	44-46 °C

Hazards
- GHS labelling
Pictograms	(GHS07: Exclamation mark)
Signal word	Warning
Hazard statements	H315, H319, H335
Precautionary statements	P261, P264, P264+P265, P271, P280, P302+P352, P304+P340, P305+P351+P338, P319, P321, P332+P317, P337+P317, P362+P364, P403+P233, P405, P501

Related compounds
Other anions	hydroxybutyrate
Related carboxylic acids	propionic acid lactic acid 3-hydroxypropanoic acid malonic acid β-hydroxyvaleric acid butyric acid β-methylbutyric acid β-hydroxy β-methylbutyric acid crotonic acid
Related compounds	erythrose threose 1,2-butanediol 1,3-butanediol 2,3-butanediol 1,4-butanediol
- Except where otherwise noted, data are given for materials in their standard state (at 25 °C [77 °F], 100 kPa). verify (what is ?) Infobox references

β-Hydroxybutyric acid, also known as 3-hydroxybutyric acid or BHB, is an organic compound and a beta hydroxy acid with the chemical formula CH_{3}CH(OH)CH_{2}CO_{2}H; its conjugate base is β-hydroxybutyrate, also known as 3-hydroxybutyrate. β-Hydroxybutyric acid is a chiral compound with two enantiomers: D-β-hydroxybutyric acid and L-β-hydroxybutyric acid. Its oxidized and polymeric derivatives occur widely in nature. In humans, D-β-hydroxybutyric acid is one of two primary endogenous agonists of hydroxycarboxylic acid receptor 2 (HCA_{2}), a G_{i/o}-coupled G protein-coupled receptor (GPCR).

== Biosynthesis ==
In humans, D-β-hydroxybutyrate can be synthesized in the liver via the metabolism of fatty acids (e.g., butyrate), β-hydroxy β-methylbutyrate, and ketogenic amino acids through a series of reactions that metabolize these compounds into acetoacetate, which is the first ketone body that is produced in the fasting state. The biosynthesis of D-β-hydroxybutyrate from acetoacetate is catalyzed by the β-hydroxybutyrate dehydrogenase enzyme.

Butyrate can also be metabolized into D-β-hydroxybutyrate via a second metabolic pathway that does not involve acetoacetate as a metabolic intermediate. This metabolic pathway is as follows:

butyrate→butyryl-CoA→crotonyl-CoA→β-hydroxybutyryl-CoA→poly-β-hydroxybutyrate→D-β-(D-β-hydroxybutyryloxy)-butyrate→D-β-hydroxybutyrate

The last reaction in this metabolic pathway, which involves the conversion of D-β-(D-β-hydroxybutyryloxy)-butyrate into D-β-hydroxybutyrate, is catalyzed by the hydroxybutyrate-dimer hydrolase enzyme.

The concentration of β-hydroxybutyrate in human blood plasma, as with other ketone bodies, increases through ketosis. This elevated β-hydroxybutyrate level is naturally expected, as β-hydroxybutyrate is formed from acetoacetate. The compound can be used as an energy source by the brain and skeletal muscle when blood glucose is low. Diabetic patients can have their ketone levels tested via urine or blood to indicate diabetic ketoacidosis. In alcoholic ketoacidosis, this ketone body is produced in greatest concentration. Ketogenesis occurs if oxaloacetate in the liver cells is depleted, a circumstance created by reduced carbohydrate intake (through diet or starvation); prolonged, excessive alcohol consumption; and/or insulin deficiency. Because oxaloacetate is crucial for entry of acetyl-CoA into the TCA cycle, the rapid production of acetyl-CoA from fatty acid oxidation in the absence of ample oxaloacetate overwhelms the decreased capacity of the TCA cycle, and the resultant excess of acetyl-CoA is shunted towards ketone body production.

Leucine metabolism in humans

Acetoacetate, the metabolic precursor of β-hydroxybutyrate, is a metabolite of fatty acids, ketogenic amino acids such as leucine and isoleucine, and β-hydroxy β-methylbutyrate

== Biological activity ==
D-β-Hydroxybutyric acid, along with butyric acid, are the two primary endogenous agonists of hydroxycarboxylic acid receptor 2 (HCA_{2}), a G_{i/o}-coupled GPCR.

β-Hydroxybutyrate is primarily carried via two classes of transporters: monocarboxylate transporters (MCTs) and sodium-coupled monocarboxylate transporters (SMCTs). MCTs enable keton bodies like β-hydroxybutyrate to enter extrahepatic tissues, like the brain, muscle and kidneys, while SMCTs (which co-transport sodium) are found in the kidneys, intestines, and certain neurones. Evidence suggests that MCT1 deficiency can lead to recurrent ketoacidosis.

BHB activities
Enzyme	IC_{50} (μM)
HDAC1	5,300
HDAC2	ND
HDAC3	2,400
HDAC4	4,500
HDAC5	ND
HDAC6	48,500
HDAC7	ND
HDAC8	ND
HDAC9	ND
HDAC10	ND
HDAC11	ND
Note: BHB can circulate at mM levels. Refs:

β-Hydroxybutyric acid is able to cross the blood–brain barrier into the central nervous system. Levels of β-hydroxybutyric acid increase in the liver, heart, muscle, brain, and other tissues with exercise, calorie restriction, fasting, and ketogenic diets. The compound has been found to act as a histone deacetylase (HDAC) inhibitor. Through inhibition of the HDAC class I isoenzymes HDAC2 and HDAC3, β-hydroxybutyric acid has been found to increase brain-derived neurotrophic factor (BDNF) levels and TrkB signaling in the hippocampus. Moreover, a rodent study found that prolonged exercise increases plasma β-hydroxybutyrate concentrations, which induces promoters of the BDNF gene in the hippocampus. These findings may have clinical relevance in the treatment of depression, anxiety, and cognitive impairment.

BHB has been found to inhibit G protein-coupled inwardly rectifying potassium channels (GIRKs) and this action appears to be involved in its anticonvulsant effects. In epilepsy patients on the ketogenic diet, blood β-hydroxybutyrate levels correlate best with degree of seizure control. The threshold for optimal anticonvulsant effect appears to be approximately 4 mmol/L.

== Laboratory and industrial chemistry ==
β-Hydroxybutyric acid is the precursor to polyesters, which are biodegradable plastics. This polymer, poly(3-hydroxybutyrate), is also naturally produced by the bacteria Alcaligenes eutrophus.

β-Hydroxybutyrate can be extracted from poly(3-hydroxybutyrate) by acid hydrolysis.

The concentration of β-hydroxybutyrate in blood plasma is measured through a test that uses β-hydroxybutyrate dehydrogenase, with NAD^{+} as an electron-accepting cofactor. The conversion of β-hydroxybutyrate to acetoacetate, which is catalyzed by this enzyme, reduces the NAD^{+} to NADH, generating an electrical change; the magnitude of this change can then be used to extrapolate the amount of β-hydroxybutyrate in the sample.

== See also ==
- γ-Hydroxybutyric acid (GHB)
- β-Hydroxy β-methylbutyric acid (HMB)
- Glyceryl-tris-3-hydroxybutyrate (3GHB)
- Hydroxybutyric acid
- Ketogenesis
