= Ruminiclostridium cellulolyticum =

Scientific classification
- Domain: Bacteria
- Kingdom: Bacillati
- Phylum: Bacillota
- Class: Clostridia
- Order: Oscillospirales
- Family: Oscillospiraceae
- Genus: Ruminiclostridium
- Species: R. cellulolyticum

Binomial name
- Ruminiclostridium cellulolyticum (Petitdemange et al. 1984) Zhang et al. 2018

Synonyms
- Clostridium cellulolyticum

Species of bacterium

Ruminiclostridium cellulolyticum is an anaerobic, motile, gram-positive bacterium. It is the most cellulolytic bacteria.
