= Aldol =

Organic compound of the form R–CH(OH)–CHR–C(=O)–R

General aldol structure showing the α and 𝛽 positions of carbons relative to the carbonyl. When R" is -H, it is an aldol, when R" is a carbon, it is a ketol.

In organic chemistry, an aldol is a structure consisting of a hydroxy group (-OH) two carbons away from either an aldehyde or a ketone. The name combines the suffix 'ol' from the alcohol and the prefix depending on the carbonyl group, either 'ald' for an aldehyde, or 'ket' for a ketone, in which case it referred to as a 'ketol'. An aldol may also use the term β-hydroxy aldehyde (or β-hydroxy ketone for a ketol). The term "aldol" may refer to 3-hydroxybutanal.

Aldols are the product of a carbon-carbon bond-formation reaction, giving them wide applicability as a precursor for a variety of other compounds.

== Synthesis and reactions ==
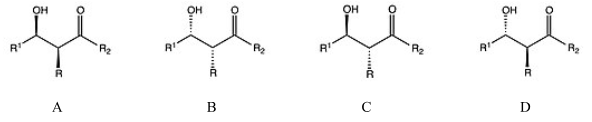
Possible stereochemical configurations for chiral aldols. R/S configurations of chiral centers: A: OH is 4R, R-group is 3R B: OH is 4S, R-group is 3S C: OH is 4R, R-group is 3S D: OH is 4S, R-group is 3R

Aldols are usually synthesized from an aldol addition reaction using two aldehydes or an aldehyde and a ketone for a ketol. These reactions may also be done intramolecularly to form 5 or 6 member rings or for stereoselective syntheses in the active area of asymmetric synthesis.

Aldols may also undergo a condensation reaction in which the hydroxy group is replaced by a pi bond. The final structure is a reactive α,β-unsaturated carbonyl compound, which can also be used in a variety of other reactions:

RC(O)CH_{2}CH(OH)R' → RC(O)CH=CHR' + H_{2}O

== Applications ==
Aldols synthesized from two aldehydes are usually unstable, often producing secondary compounds such as diols, unsaturated aldehydes, or alcohols. Hydroxypivaldehyde is a rare example of a distillable aldol. The aldol 3-hydroxybutanal is a precursor to quinaldine, which is a precursor to the dye quinoline Yellow SS.

Aldols are also used as intermediates in the synthesis of polyketide natural products and drugs such as Oseltamivir and Epothilone.

== See also ==
- Aldol reactions
- Beta hydroxycarboxylic acid
