= 2,3-Epoxybutane =

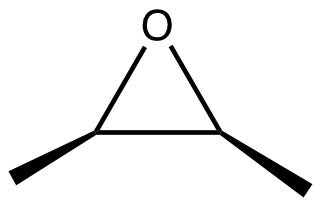

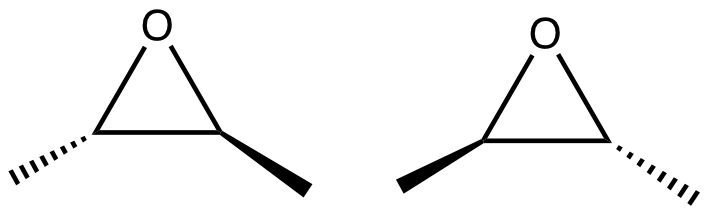

Names
- Preferred IUPAC name 2,3-Dimethyloxirane
- Other names 2,3-Butyleneoxide, 2,3-Buteneoxide

Identifiers
| CAS Number | 3266-23-7; meso or cis: 1758-33-4; S,S: 21490-63-1; R,R: 1758-32-3 |
| 3D model (JSmol) | Interactive image; meso or cis: Interactive image; S,S: Interactive image; R,R: Interactive image |
| ChemSpider | 17595; meso or cis: 83206; S,S: 28456; R,R: 4937496 |
| ECHA InfoCard | 100.019.889 |
| EC Number | 221-877-8; meso or cis: 244-406-8; R,R: 244-406-8 |
| PubChem CID | 18632; meso or cis: 92162; S,S: 30664; R,R: 6432237 |
| UN number | 3271 |
| CompTox Dashboard (EPA) | DTXSID5025239 |
- InChI: InChI=1S/C4H8O/c1-3-4(2)5-3/h3-4H,1-2H3 Key: PQXKWPLDPFFDJP-UHFFFAOYSA-N; meso or cis: InChI=1S/C4H8O/c1-3-4(2)5-3/h3-4H,1-2H3/t3-,4+ Key: PQXKWPLDPFFDJP-ZXZARUISSA-N; S,S: InChI=1S/C4H8O/c1-3-4(2)5-3/h3-4H,1-2H3/t3-,4-/m0/s1 Key: PQXKWPLDPFFDJP-IMJSIDKUSA-N; R,R: InChI=1S/C4H8O/c1-3-4(2)5-3/h3-4H,1-2H3/t3-,4-/m1/s1 Key: PQXKWPLDPFFDJP-QWWZWVQMSA-N
- SMILES: CC1C(O1)C; meso or cis: C[C@@H]1[C@@H](O1)C; S,S: C[C@H]1[C@@H](O1)C; R,R: C[C@@H]1[C@H](O1)C

Properties
| Chemical formula | C_{4}H_{8}O |
| Molar mass | 72.107 g·mol^{−1} |
| Appearance | colorless liquid |
| Density | 0.837 g·cm^{−3} |
| Boiling point | 64–78 °C (147–172 °F; 337–351 K) |

Hazards
- GHS labelling
| Pictograms | (GHS05: Corrosive) (GHS07: Exclamation mark) (GHS09: Environmental hazard) |
| Signal word | Danger |
| Hazard statements | H225, H315, H319, H335, H341 |
| Precautionary statements | P203, P210, P233, P240, P241, P242, P243, P261, P264, P264+P265, P271, P280, P302+P352, P303+P361+P353, P304+P340, P305+P351+P338, P318, P319, P321, P332+P317, P337+P317, P362+P364, P370+P378, P403+P233, P403+P235, P405, P501 |
- Except where otherwise noted, data are given for materials in their standard state (at 25 °C [77 °F], 100 kPa). Infobox references

2,3-Epoxybutane is an organic compound with the formula CH_{3}CH(O)CHCH_{3}. It is an epoxide. The compound exists as three stereoisomers, a pair of enantiomers and the meso isomer. All are colorless liquids.

== Preparation and reactions ==
2,3-Epoxybutane is prepared from 2-butene via the chlorohydrin:

CH_{3}CH=CHCH_{3} + HOCl → CH_{3}CH(OH)CH(Cl)CH_{3}
CH_{3}CH(OH)CH(Cl)CH_{3} → CH_{3}CH(O)CHCH_{3} + HCl

A common reaction is its hydration to 2,3-butanediol. Many such ring-opening reactions have been reported.
