= 3-Hydroxybutanal =

Organic compound with the formula CH3CH(OH)CH2CHO

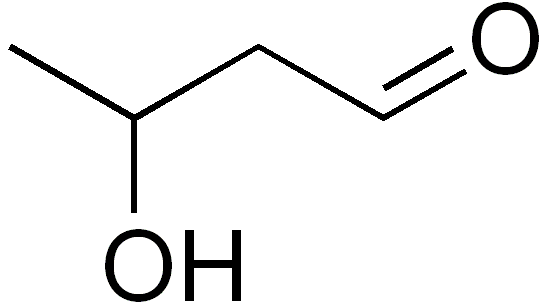
- Skeletal formula of 3-hydroxybutanal

Names
- Preferred IUPAC name 3-Hydroxybutanal
- Other names: Acetaldol; 3-Hydroxybutyraldehyde; beta-Hydroxybutyraldehyde; β-Hydroxybutyraldehyde

Identifiers
CAS Number	107-89-1 (R/S); 117706-97-5 (R); 117706-98-6 (S)
3D model (JSmol)	Interactive image
ChemSpider	7609 (R/S); 18915429 (R)
ECHA InfoCard	100.003.210
EC Number	203-530-2
MeSH	3-hydroxybutanal
PubChem CID	7897 (R/S); 13061653 (R)
UNII	8C6G962B53
CompTox Dashboard (EPA)	DTXSID2050407
- InChI: InChI=1S/C4H8O2/c1-4(6)2-3-5/h3-4,6H,2H2,1H3 Key: HSJKGGMUJITCBW-UHFFFAOYSA-N; InChI=1/C4H8O2/c1-4(6)2-3-5/h3-4,6H,2H2,1H3 Key: HSJKGGMUJITCBW-UHFFFAOYAI
- SMILES: CC(O)CC=O

Properties
Chemical formula	C_{4}H_{8}O_{2}
Molar mass	88.106 g·mol^{−1}
Appearance	colorless liquid
Density	0.98 g/mL
Boiling point	162 °C (324 °F; 435 K)

Related compounds
Related aldehydes	Glycolaldehyde Lactaldehyde
- Except where otherwise noted, data are given for materials in their standard state (at 25 °C [77 °F], 100 kPa). verify (what is ?) Infobox references

In organic chemistry, 3-hydroxybutanal (acetaldol, aldol) is an organic compound with the formula CH_{3}CH(OH)CH_{2}CHO and the structure H_{3}C−CH(OH)−CH_{2}−CH=O. It is classified as an aldol (R−CH(OH)−CHR'−C(=O)−R") and the word "aldol" can refer specifically to 3-hydroxybutanal. It is formally the product of the dimerization of acetaldehyde (CH_{3}CHO). A thick colorless or pale-yellow liquid, it is a versatile and valuable intermediate with diverse impacts. The compound is chiral although this aspect is not often exploited.

== Production ==
Acetaldehyde dimerizes upon treatment with aqueous sodium hydroxide:

2 CH_{3}CHO → CH_{3}CH(OH)CH_{2}CHO + H_{2}O

This is the prototypical aldol reaction.

== Reactions and uses ==
Dehydration of 3-hydroxybutanal gives crotonaldehyde. Distillation of 3-hydroxybutanal is sufficiently forcing to effect this conversion:

CH_{3}CH(OH)CH_{2}CHO → CH_{3}CH=CHCHO + H_{2}O

Hydrogenation of 3-hydroxybutanal gives 1,3-butanediol:

CH_{3}CH(OH)CH_{2}CHO + H_{2} → CH_{3}CH(OH)CH_{2}CH_{2}OH

This diol is a precursor to 1,3-butadiene, precursor to diverse polymers.

Polymerization of 3-hydroxybutanal is also spontaneous, but can be stopped with the addition of water.

Aldol has been used in making perfumes and in ore flotation.

== Former or niche uses ==
It was formerly used in medicine as a hypnotic and sedative.

== See also ==
- 4-Hydroxybutanal
