= 2,3-Butanediol =

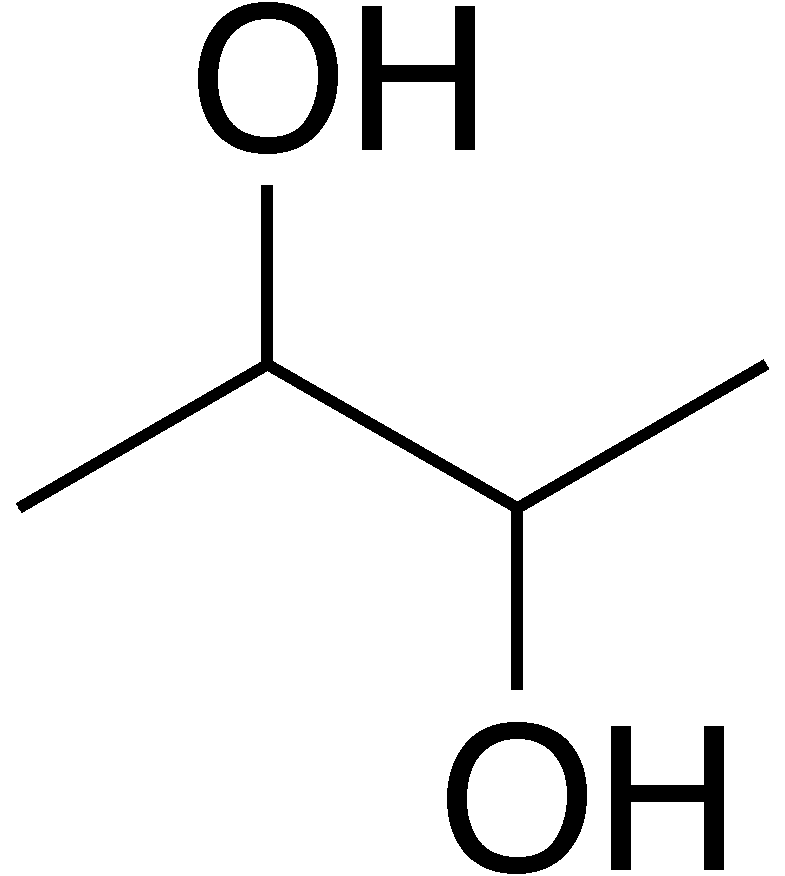
- 2,3-butanediol

Names
- Preferred IUPAC name Butane-2,3-diol
- Other names 2,3-Butylene glycol Pseudobutylene glycol 2,3-Dihydroxybutane; Butan-2,3-diol; Diethanol & Bis-ethanol

Identifiers
| CAS Number | 513-85-9; 19132-06-0 (2S,3S)-(+); 24347-58-8 (2R,3R)-(−); 5341-95-7 (2R,3S) |
| 3D model (JSmol) | Interactive image |
| ChEBI | CHEBI:62064 |
| ChEMBL | ChEMBL2312529 |
| ChemSpider | 257 |
| ECHA InfoCard | 100.007.431 |
| EC Number | 208-173-6 |
| PubChem CID | 262 |
| UNII | 45427ZB5IJ; 7E9UXG71S1 (2S,3S)-(+); OR02B2286A (2R,3R)-(−); F5IA8X9O8M (2R,3S) |
| CompTox Dashboard (EPA) | DTXSID8041321 |
- InChI: InChI=1S/C4H10O2/c1-3(5)4(2)6/h3-6H,1-2H3 Key: OWBTYPJTUOEWEK-UHFFFAOYSA-N
- SMILES: CC(C(C)O)O

Properties
| Chemical formula | C_{4}H_{10}O_{2} |
| Molar mass | 90.122 g·mol^{−1} |
| Appearance | Colorless liquid |
| Odor | odorless |
| Density | 0.987 g/mL |
| Melting point | 19 °C (66 °F; 292 K) |
| Boiling point | 177 °C (351 °F; 450 K) |
| Solubility in water | Miscible |
| Solubility in other solvents | Soluble in alcohol, ketones, ether |
| log P | −0.92 |
| Vapor pressure | 0.23 hPa (20 °C) |
| Acidity (pK_{a}) | 14.9 |
| Refractive index (n_{D}) | 1.4366 |

Thermochemistry
| Heat capacity (C) | 213.0 J/K mol |
| Std enthalpy of formation (Δ_{f}H^{⦵}_{298}) | −544.8 kJ/mol |

Hazards
| NFPA 704 (fire diamond) | 1 1 0 |
| Flash point | 85 °C (185 °F; 358 K) |
| Autoignition temperature | 402 °C (756 °F; 675 K) |
- Lethal dose or concentration (LD, LC)
| LD_{50} (median dose) | 5462 mg/kg (rat, oral) |

Related compounds
| Related butanediols | 1,4-Butanediol; 1,3-Butanediol |
- Except where otherwise noted, data are given for materials in their standard state (at 25 °C [77 °F], 100 kPa). verify (what is ?) Infobox references

2,3-Butanediol is the organic compound with the formula (CH_{3}CHOH)_{2}. It is classified as a vic-diol (glycol). It exists as three stereoisomers, a chiral pair and the meso isomer. All are colorless liquids. Applications include precursors to various plastics and pesticides.

== Isomerism ==
Of the three stereoisomers, two are enantiomers (levo- and dextro-2,3-butanediol) and one is a meso compound. The enantiomeric pair have (2R, 3R) and (2S, 3S) configurations at carbons 2 and 3, while the meso compound has configuration (2R, 3S) or, equivalently, (2S, 3R).

== Industrial production and uses ==
2,3-Butanediol is prepared by hydrolysis of 2,3-epoxybutane:

(CH_{3}CH)_{2}O + H_{2}O → CH_{3}(CHOH)_{2}CH_{3}

The isomer distribution depends on the stereochemistry of the epoxide.

The meso isomer is used to combine with naphthalene-1,5-diisocyanate. The resulting polyurethane is called "Vulkollan".

== Biological production ==
The (2R,3R)-stereoisomer of 2,3-butanediol is produced by a variety of microorganisms in a process known as butanediol fermentation. It is found naturally in cocoa butter, in the roots of Ruta graveolens, sweet corn, and in rotten mussels. It is used in the resolution of carbonyl compounds in gas chromatography.

During World War II research was done towards producing 2,3-butanediol by fermentation in order to produce 1,3-butadiene, the monomer of the polybutadiene used in a leading type of synthetic rubber. It can be derived from the fermentation of sugarcane molasses.

Fermentative production of 2,3-butanediol from carbohydrates involves a network of biochemical reactions that can be manipulated to maximize production.

2,3-butanediol has been proposed as a rocket fuel that could be created on Mars by means of cyanobacteria and E. coli, shipped from Earth, working on resources available at the surface of Mars.

2,3-Butanediol has been detected, in peppers, grape wine, anatidaes.

== Reactions ==
2,3-Butanediol undergo dehydration to form butanone (methyl ethyl ketone):

(CH_{3}CHOH)_{2} → CH_{3}C(O)CH_{2}CH_{3} + H_{2}O

It can also undergo deoxydehydration to form butene:

(CH_{3}CHOH)_{2} + 2 H_{2} → C_{4}H_{8} + 2 H_{2}O
