= 2-Hydroxyisobutyric acid =

Names
- Preferred IUPAC name 2-Hydroxy-2-methylpropanoic acid
- Other names α-Hydroxyisobutyric acid 2-Hydroxyisobutanoic acid α-Hydroxyisobutanoic acid 2-Hydroxy-2-methyl propionic acid 2-Methyllactic acid 2-Methylglycolic acid Acetonic acid Hydroxydimethylacetic acid

Identifiers
CAS Number	594-61-6
3D model (JSmol)	Interactive image
Beilstein Reference	1744739
ChEBI	CHEBI:50129
ChEMBL	ChEMBL1345148
ChemSpider	11181
ECHA InfoCard	100.008.955
EC Number	209-848-8
PubChem CID	11671
UNII	DMW250U2HF
CompTox Dashboard (EPA)	DTXSID4032954
- InChI: InChI=1S/C4H8O3/c1-4(2,7)3(5)6/h7H,1-2H3,(H,5,6) Key: BWLBGMIXKSTLSX-UHFFFAOYSA-N
- SMILES: CC(C)(C(=O)O)O

Properties
Chemical formula	C_{4}H_{8}O_{3}
Molar mass	104.105 g·mol^{−1}
Appearance	white solid
Density	1.23 g/cm^{3}
Melting point	82.5 °C (180.5 °F; 355.6 K)
Boiling point	212 °C (414 °F; 485 K)

Hazards
- GHS labelling
Pictograms	(GHS02: Flammable) (GHS07: Exclamation mark)
Signal word	Danger
Hazard statements	H302, H315, H318, H335
Precautionary statements	P261, P264, P264+P265, P270, P271, P280, P301+P317, P302+P352, P304+P340, P305+P354+P338, P317, P319, P321, P330, P332+P317, P362+P364, P403+P233, P405, P501
- Except where otherwise noted, data are given for materials in their standard state (at 25 °C [77 °F], 100 kPa). Infobox references

2-Hydroxyisobutyric acid is the organic compound with the formula (CH_{3})_{2}C(OH)CO_{2}H. A white solid, it is classified as an hydroxycarboxylic acid. It has been considered as a naturally occurring precursor to polyesters. It is closely related to lactic acid (CH_{3}CH(OH)CO_{2}H).

== Occurrences ==
The enzyme 2-hydroxyisobutyryl coenzyme A (CoA) mutase isomerizes 3-hydroxybutyryl coenzyme A into 2-hydroxyisobutyryl coenzyme A. Hydrolysis of the latter gives 2-hydroxyisobutyric acid.

The amides formed from this carboxylic acid and the ε-amino group of lysine residues are a kind of post translational modification.

Ethyl methacrylate (an industrially important monomer and ester of methacrylic acid) was first obtained by treating the ethyl ester of 2-hydroxyisobutyric acid with phosphorus pentachloride in an apparent dehydration reaction.

== See also ==
- 3-Hydroxyisobutyric acid
