= Deoxydehydration =

Deoxydehydration (DODH) is a chemical reaction for removing two adjacent hydroxyl groups in a vicinal diol to form an alkene. In contrast to hydrodeoxygenation which uses hydrogen as a reductant, deoxydehydration is able to use a variety of other reductants such as alcohols and organic phosphines. In research, the most common homogeneous catalysts for this reaction use rhenium.

Recently, research has focused on the use of vanadium heterogeneous catalysts for deoxydehydration, such as the conversion of 2,3-butanediol to butene. Although deoxydehydration over vanadium catalysts requires higher temperatures than over rhenium catalysts, the reaction can proceed without the need for hydrogen or external reductants, which can reduce waste products.
