= 1,3-Butanediol =

- Skeletal formula of 1,3-butanediol

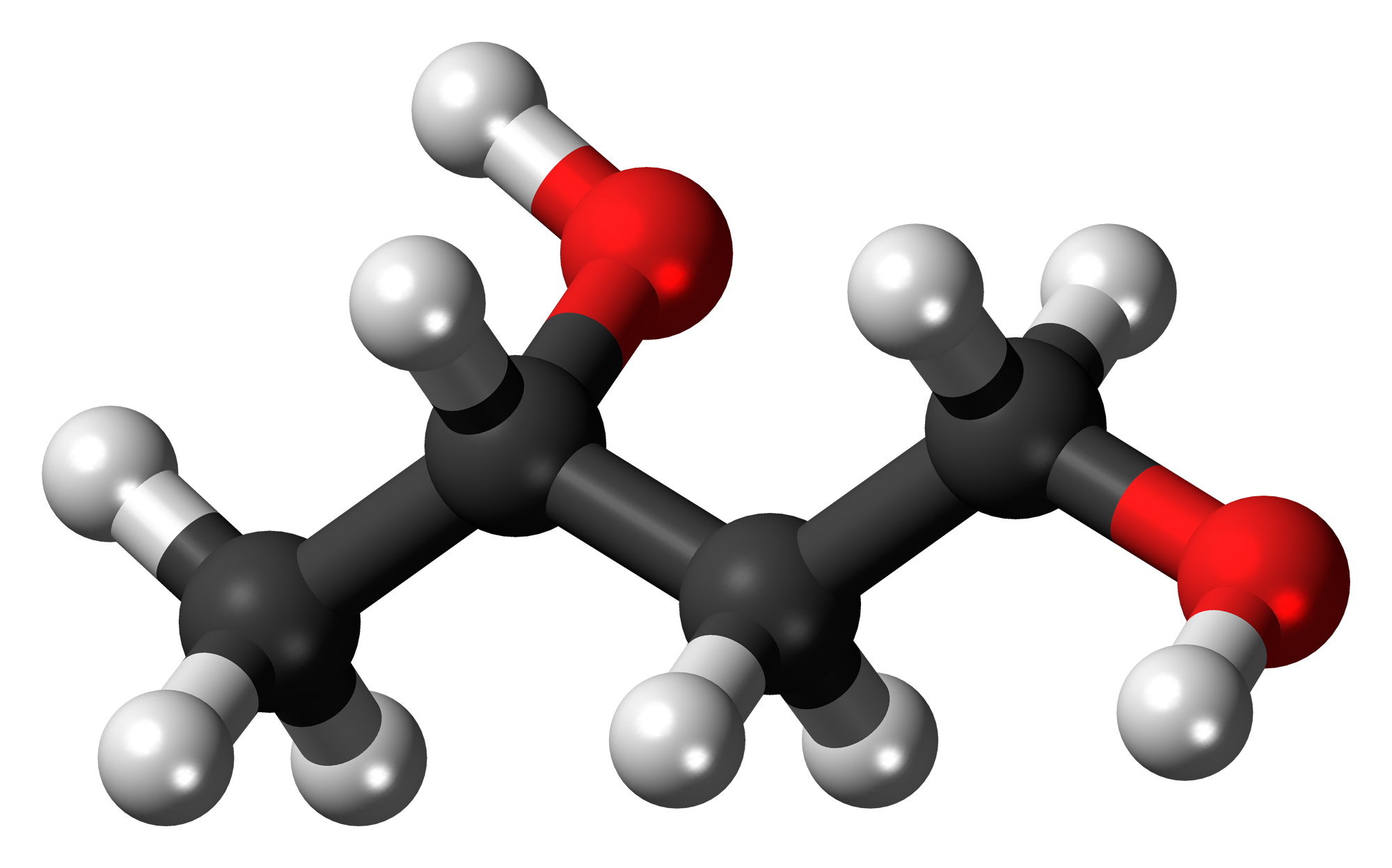
Ball and stick model of 1,3-butanediol (S)
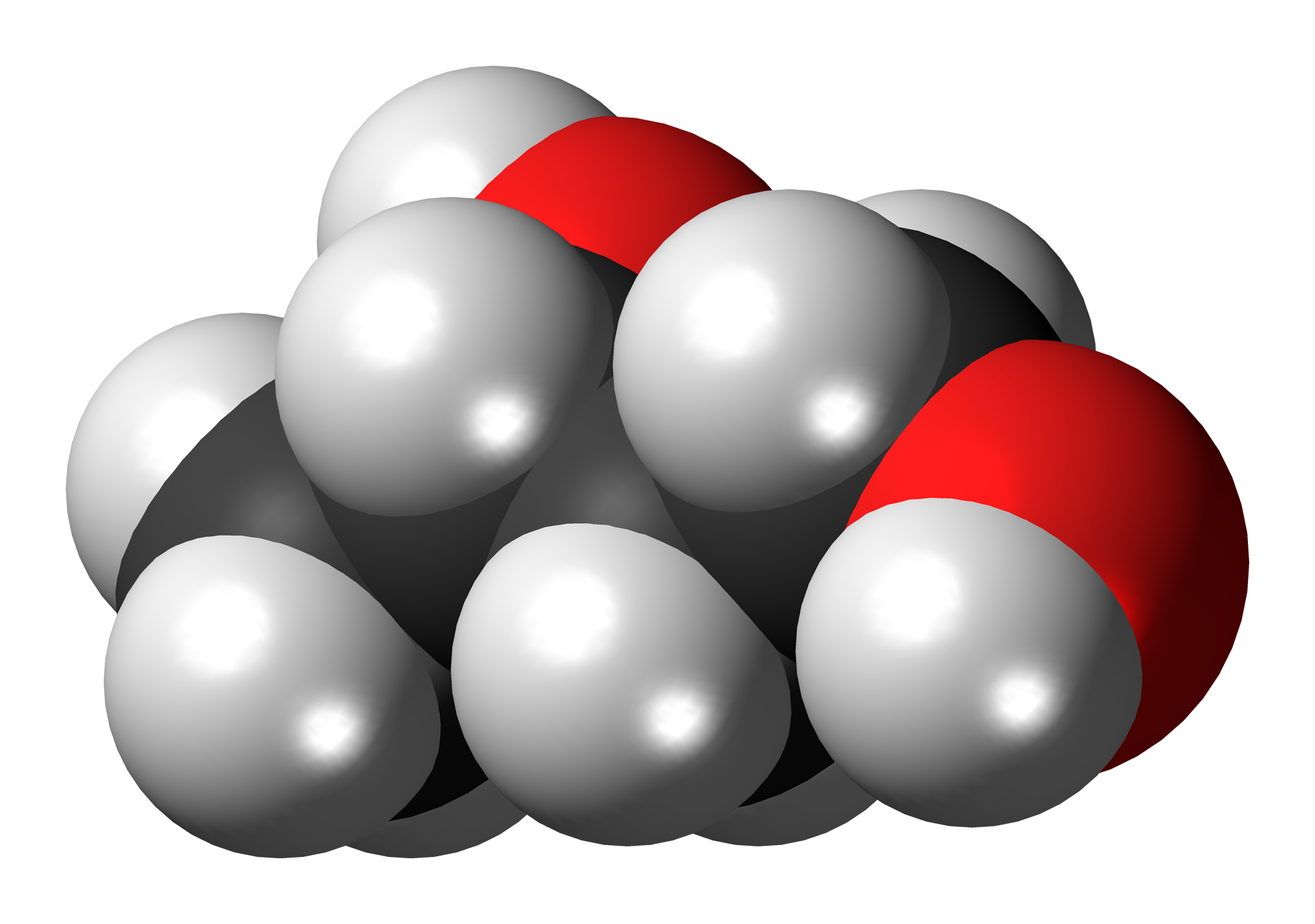
Spacefill model of 1,3-butanediol (S)

Names
- Preferred IUPAC name Butane-1,3-diol
- Other names 1,3-butylene glycol, butane-1,3-diol, or 1,3-dihydroxybutane; Ketohol

Identifiers
CAS Number	107-88-0; 6290-03-5 (R); 24621-61-2 (S)
3D model (JSmol)	Interactive image
Beilstein Reference	1731276 1718944 (R); 1718943 (S)
ChEBI	CHEBI:52683
ChEMBL	ChEMBL1231503
ChemSpider	7608; 553103 (R); 394191 (S)
DrugBank	DB02202
ECHA InfoCard	100.003.209
EC Number	203-529-7
E number	E1502 (additional chemicals)
Gmelin Reference	2409 2493173 (R); 1994384 (S)
KEGG	D10695
MeSH	1,3-Butylene+glycol
PubChem CID	7896; 637497 (R); 446973 (S)
RTECS number	EK0440000
UNII	3XUS85K0RA
CompTox Dashboard (EPA)	DTXSID8026773
- InChI: InChI=1S/C4H10O2/c1-4(6)2-3-5/h4-6H,2-3H2,1H3 Key: PUPZLCDOIYMWBV-UHFFFAOYSA-N
- SMILES: CC(O)CCO

Properties
Chemical formula	C_{4}H_{10}O_{2}
Molar mass	90.122 g·mol^{−1}
Appearance	Colourless liquid
Density	1.0053 g cm^{−3}
Melting point	−50 °C (−58 °F; 223 K)
Boiling point	204 to 210 °C; 399 to 410 °F; 477 to 483 K
Solubility in water	1 kg dm^{−3}
log P	−0.74
Vapor pressure	8 Pa (at 20 °C)
Refractive index (n_{D})	1.44

Thermochemistry
Std molar entropy (S^{⦵}_{298})	227.2 J K^{−1} mol^{−1}
Std enthalpy of formation (Δ_{f}H^{⦵}_{298})	−501 kJ mol^{−1}
Std enthalpy of combustion (Δ_{c}H^{⦵}_{298})	−2.5022 MJ mol^{−1}

Hazards
- GHS labelling
Pictograms	(GHS07: Exclamation mark)
Signal word	Warning
Hazard statements	H319, H413
Precautionary statements	P305+P351+P338
NFPA 704 (fire diamond)	1 1 0
Flash point	108 °C (226 °F; 381 K)
Autoignition temperature	394 °C (741 °F; 667 K)

Related compounds
Related butanediol	1,2-Butanediol 1,4-Butanediol; 2,3-Butanediol
Related compounds	2-Methylpentane
- Except where otherwise noted, data are given for materials in their standard state (at 25 °C [77 °F], 100 kPa). verify (what is ?) Infobox references

1,3-Butanediol (also 1,3-butylene glycol) is an organic compound with the formula C_{4}H_{10}O_{2} (CH_{3}CH(OH)CH_{2}CH_{2}OH). It is one of four structural isomers of butanediol.

With two alcohol functional groups, the molecule is classified as a secondary alcohol and diol. Without the R (or D) designation, it is racemic. It is a colorless, bittersweet, water-soluble liquid.

1,3-Butanediol is commonly used as a deodorizer and as a solvent for additives that flavor foods. In resin manufacturing, it is a chemical intermediate for making polyurethane and polyesters.

== Synthesis ==
It can be manufactured by the aldol condensation of acetaldehyde, then by catalytic hydrogenation.

Hydrogenation of 3-hydroxybutanal gives 1,3-butanediol:

CH_{3}CH(OH)CH_{2}CHO + H_{2} → CH_{3}CH(OH)CH_{2}CH_{2}OH

Dehydration of 1,3-butanediol gives 1,3-butadiene:

CH_{3}CH(OH)CH_{2}CH_{2}OH → CH_{2}=CH-CH=CH_{2} + 2 H_{2}O

Manufactured 1,3-butanediol is flammable.

== Occurrence ==
1,3-Butanediol is present in bell peppers (Capsicum annuum).

== Uses and research ==
It is used as an air freshener, flavor ingredient in foods, animal foods, and in handicrafts. It is recognized as a safe food ingredient in the United States.

1,3-Butanediol is under preliminary research for its potential use in recovery from intense exercise, although its high cost of production is a barrier to general adoption for this purpose.

It is considered to be a potential oral exogenous ketone agent for treating brain mechanisms influencing weight loss in anorexia nervosa.
