= Monomer =

Molecule which reacts with other monomers to form a polymer

A monomer (/ˈmɒnəmər/ MON-ə-mər; mono-, "one" + -mer, "part") is a molecule that can react together with other monomer molecules to form a larger polymer chain or two- or three-dimensional network in a process called polymerization.

IUPAC definition

Monomer molecule: A molecule which can undergo polymerization, thereby contributing constitutional units to the essential structure of a macromolecule.

== Classification ==
Chemistry classifies monomers by type, and two broad classes based on the type of polymer they form.

By type:

- natural vs synthetic, e.g. glycine vs caprolactam, respectively
- polar vs nonpolar, e.g. vinyl acetate vs ethylene, respectively
- cyclic vs linear, e.g. ethylene oxide vs ethylene glycol, respectively

By type of polymer they form:

- those that participate in condensation polymerization
- those that participate in addition polymerization

Differing stoichiometry causes each class to create its respective form of polymer.

This nylon is formed by condensation polymerization of two monomers, yielding water

The polymerization of one kind of monomer gives a homopolymer. Many polymers are copolymers, meaning that they are derived from two different monomers. In the case of condensation polymerizations, the ratio of comonomers is usually 1:1. For example, the formation of many nylons requires equal amounts of a dicarboxylic acid and diamine. In the case of addition polymerizations, the comonomer content is often only a few percent. For example, small amounts of 1-octene monomer are copolymerized with ethylene to give specialized polyethylene.

== Synthetic monomers ==
- Ethylene gas (H_{2}C=CH_{2}) is the monomer for polyethylene.
- Other modified ethylene derivatives include:
  - tetrafluoroethylene (F_{2}C=CF_{2}) which leads to Teflon
  - vinyl chloride (H_{2}C=CHCl) which leads to PVC
  - styrene (C_{6}H_{5}CH=CH_{2}) which leads to polystyrene
- Epoxide monomers may be cross linked with themselves, or with the addition of a co-reactant, to form epoxy
- BPA is the monomer precursor for polycarbonate
- Terephthalic acid is a comonomer that, with ethylene glycol, forms polyethylene terephthalate.
- Dimethylsilicon dichloride is a monomer that, upon hydrolysis, gives polydimethylsiloxane.
- Ethyl methacrylate is an acrylic monomer that, when combined with an acrylic polymer, catalyzes and forms an acrylate plastic used to create artificial nail extensions

== Biopolymers ==
The term "monomeric protein" may also be used to describe one of the proteins making up a multiprotein complex.

== Natural monomers ==
Some of the main biopolymers are listed below:

=== Amino acids ===
For proteins, the monomers are amino acids. Polymerization occurs at ribosomes. Usually about 20 types of amino acid monomers are used to produce proteins. Hence proteins are not homopolymers.

=== Nucleotides ===
For polynucleic acids (DNA/RNA), the monomers are nucleotides, each of which is made of a pentose sugar, a nitrogenous base and a phosphate group. Nucleotide monomers are found in the cell nucleus. Four types of nucleotide monomers are precursors to DNA and four different nucleotide monomers are precursors to RNA.

=== Glucose and related sugars ===
For carbohydrates, the monomers are monosaccharides. The most abundant natural monomer is glucose, which is linked by glycosidic bonds into the polymers cellulose, starch, and glycogen.

=== Isoprene ===
Isoprene is a natural monomer that polymerizes to form a natural rubber, most often cis-1,4-polyisoprene, but also trans-1,4-polymer. Synthetic rubbers are often based on butadiene, which is structurally related to isoprene.

== See also ==
- Protein subunit
- List of publications in polymer chemistry
- Prepolymer
