= Lysine malonylation =

Post-translational modification

Protein with a lysine residue at physiological pH: unmodified (left) and malonylated (right).

Lysine malonylation (Kmal, maK), protein malonylation or malonylation, is a reversible post-translational modification (PTM) in eukaryotic and prokaryotic cells, in which a malonyl group (–CO–CH2–COOH) is added to a lysine (K) residue of a protein. It was first identified in 2011 by Peng et al. as an evolutionarily conserved modification and belongs to the acidic acyl modifications such as succinylation and glutarylation. As a dynamically regulated modification, it responds to conditions such as stress responses, metabolic processes, and mutations, thereby influencing the charge, structure, and function of proteins. This involves, among other things, the metabolic pathways of glucose and fatty acids as well as histone-mediated gene regulation, and is increasingly associated with immune regulation, angiogenesis, osteoarthritis, cancer and metabolic diseases such as obesity and type 2 diabetes. Its biological significance is increasingly recognized, but many aspects of its regulation and function remain unresolved, so that its therapeutic potential is still unexplored.

== Chemical properties ==
At physiological pH, the ε-amino group (–NH_{2}) of the lysine residue exists almost entirely in its protonated form (–NH_{3}^{+}), whereas the carboxyl group (–COOH) of the malonyl group exists almost entirely in its deprotonated form (–COO^{-}). Through the covalent attachment of a malonyl group to the ε-amino group, the lysine residue loses its positive charge and assumes the negative charge of the malonyl group, resulting in a charge shift from +1 to −1. This complete reversal of charge is thought to disrupt ionic interactions both within the protein itself and with negatively charged components of nucleotides, proteins and small molecules. Such alterations can occur at multiple lysine residues within a single protein, although their overall frequency varies considerably across the proteome. In mouse liver, for example, about half of all malonylated proteins contain a single site, while the frequency decreases sharply beyond four sites and only a few are extensively modified, the most heavily modified enzyme being carbamoyl‑phosphate synthetase 1 (CPS1) of the urea cycle with 31 sites.

In the context of other lysine acylations, malonylation can be positioned as follows:

While acetylation neutralizes lysine's positive charge, malonylation introduces a negative one, placing it among the acidic acylations alongside methylmalonylation, succinylation, glutarylation, 3‑hydroxy‑3‑methylglutarylation, 3‑methylglutaconylation, and 3‑methylglutarylation. In size, malonylation (three carbons) is bulkier than acetylation (two) but smaller than succinylation (four) and glutarylation (five). As a result, such acidic acyl modifications, as discussed for malonylation and succinylation, are expected to exert a greater impact than acetylation at the same lysine site.

Each modification arises from the corresponding acyl-CoA derivative. Malonyl‑CoA is produced in cytosol and mitochondria by acetyl‑CoA carboxylase (ACC) and, in mitochondria, also by acyl-CoA synthetase family member 3 (ACSF3); succinyl‑CoA stems from the TCA cycle and amino acid catabolism; glutaryl‑CoA from amino acid catabolism; and methylmalonyl‑CoA from amino acid and odd‑chain fatty acid metabolism, which accumulates in vitamin B12 deficiency and methylmalonic acidemias. Malonyl‑CoA is far less reactive toward proteins than succinyl‑CoA or glutaryl‑CoA because, like acetyl‑CoA, its shorter carbon chain cannot support the intramolecular catalysis needed to form a reactive cyclic anhydride intermediate, which in turn enables modification over a broader pH range. Malonyl, succinyl, and glutaryl groups are removed by Sirtuin 5 (SIRT5), which shows little activity toward acetylation.

Malonylation occurs mainly in mitochondria but also in the cytosol and nucleus. In mouse liver, about 60% of malonylated proteins are mitochondrial, whereas in human fibroblasts the distribution is more even. Succinylation and glutarylation are likewise enriched in mitochondria but not exclusive to them. The relative abundance of these modifications reflects acyl-CoA availability: acetylation is most common, succinylation reaches 10–30 % of acetylation levels, malonylation is at least tenfold less frequent, and glutarylation occurs only in trace amounts. In addition to their differing frequencies, malonylation, succinylation, and acetylation can also target the same lysine site. In mouse liver mitochondria, about 85 % of succinylation sites overlap with at least one of these modifications, and ~6 % can contain all three, mainly in proteins involved in fatty acid oxidation, glutaryl-CoA degradation, and ketogenesis. In contrast, only 55 % of malonylation sites overlap with succinylation, while about 45 % are unique. These distinct patterns suggest a specific regulatory role for malonylation among lysine acyl modifications.

Selected lysine acyl modifications
| | | Acetylation | Malonylation | Methylmalonylation | Succinylation | Glutarylation |
|---|---|---|---|---|---|---|
| Functional group | Chemical formula | C_{2}H_{3}O | C_{3}H_{3}O_{3} | C_{4}H_{5}O_{3} | C_{4}H_{4}O_{4} | C_{5}H_{6}O_{4} |
| Functional group | Condensed structural formula | –CO–CH3 | –CO–CH_{2}–COOH | –CO–CH(CH_{3})–COOH | –CO–(CH_{2})_{2}–COOH | –CO–(CH_{2})_{3}–COOH |
| Bulkiness | | Two-carbon group | Three-carbon group | Four-carbon group | Four-carbon group | Five-carbon group |
| Charge shift | | +1 → 0 | +1 → -1 | | | |
| Donor | | Acetyl-CoA | Malonyl-CoA | Methylmalonyl-CoA | Succinyl-CoA | Glutaryl-CoA |
| Frequency | | Acetyl-CoA < Succinyl-CoA < Malonyl-CoA < Glutaryl-CoA | | | | |
| Non-enzymatic acylation: Reactivity | | No anhydride ring formation | No anhydride ring formation | Unknown | Highly reactive five‑membered cyclic anhydride intermediate | Highly reactive six‑membered cyclic anhydride intermediate |
| Enzymatic deacylation: Enzymes (Eraser) | | Nucleus: HDAC1, HDAC2, HDAC3, Sirtuin 1, Sirtuin 2; Cytoplasm: Sirtuin 1, Sirtuin 2; Mitochondria: Sirtuin 3 | Global: Sirtuin 5 | | | |
| Pathways | | Nearly all enzymes involved in core metabolic pathways linked to insulin secretion; Gene regulation | Glucose metabolism; Fatty acid metabolism; Glutaryl-CoA degregation; Ketogenesis | Glutathione synthesis; Urea cycle; Arginine biosynthesis; Oxidoreductase activity | Oxioreductase activity; Amino acid metabolism; Fatty acid metabolism; Glutaryl-CoA degregation; Ketogenesis | Oxioreductase activity; Amino acid metabolism; Fatty acid metabolism; Glutaryl-CoA degregation; Ketogenesis |

== Malonyl-CoA as donor ==
Malonyl-CoA, the donor for lysine malonylation, cannot cross membranes and must be synthesized locally in each cellular compartment.

- In the cytosol, acetyl-CoA carboxylase (ACC) generates malonyl-CoA from acetyl-CoA and CO_{2} and is responsible for the majority of the cellular malonyl-CoA pool. The amount of malonyl-CoA in the cytosol is tightly regulated by the opposing activities of ACC and malonyl-CoA decarboxylase (MCD), which catalyzes the reverse reaction to produce acetyl-CoA and CO_{2}. Cytosolic malonyl-CoA plays a key role in regulating fatty acid metabolism. Although malonyl-CoA itself cannot enter mitochondria, malonate produced through non-enzymatic hydrolysis of cytosolic malonyl-CoA may cross membranes and contribute to the mitochondrial malonyl-CoA pool.
- In mitochondria, the malonyl-CoA pool is generated by acyl-CoA synthetase family member 3 (ACSF3), which catalyzes the thioesterification of malonate and CoA, and by a mitochondrial isoform of acetyl-CoA carboxylase 1 (mtACC1), which produces malonyl-CoA through the carboxylation of acetyl-CoA and CO_{2}. Complementing these synthetic activities, MCD likeweise operates in mitochondria, where it converts malonyl-CoA back to acetyl-CoA and CO_{2}. Mitochondrial malonyl‑CoA is essential for local protein malonylation as well as for mitochondrial fatty acid synthesis (mtFAS).
- In the nucleus, malonyl-CoA is synthesized by ACC1, which is mainly cytoplasmic, suggesting a local and possibly unconventional function.

The extent of malonylation increases with malonyl‑CoA availability particularly under conditions such as metabolic stress or enzyme deficiencies, for example malonyl‑CoA decarboxylase deficiency.

== Mechanism ==
Non-enzymatic malonylation occurs spontaneously through direct transfer of a malonyl group from malonyl‑CoA to the ε-amino group (–NH_{2}) of a deprotonated lysine residue, without enzyme involvement. Only the deprotonated lysine residue can react in this way because its ε-amino group carries a free electron pair that can attack the carbonyl carbon of the highly reactive malonyl-CoA thioester, whose electron-withdrawing carboxyl group further increases its reactivity. Since the lysine residue has a pK_{a} of about 10.5, however, it exists almost entirely in its protonated form at physiological pH (~7.4), with less than 0.1% deprotonated as calculated from the Henderson–Hasselbalch equation. Local protein microenvironments, such as near negatively charged residues or within hydrophobic pockets, can additionally enable lysine deprotonation, while broader conditions such as the more alkaline pH (~8.0) of the mitochondrial matrix increase the fraction of deprotonated lysine residues to about 0.3%, (Note: as calculated from the Henderson–Hasselbalch equation) thereby favoring non-enzymatic malonylation. In compartments with near-neutral pH (~7.2), such as the cytosol or nucleus, lysine residues are therefore almost fully protonated and rely more on enzymatic malonylation there, suggesting that both mechanisms contribute to the overall malonylation pattern in cells.

In enzymatic malonylation, protonated lysine residues (–NH_{3}^{+}), which is the form in which they almost all exist (≈ 99.9%) at physiological pH (~7.4), can also be modified. Structural similarities between acetyl-CoA and malonyl-CoA suggest that certain lysine acetyltransferases (KATs) may also catalyze malonylation. KAT2A (GCN5) has been experimentally linked to histone malonylation and is currently the strongest candidate, while p300 has also been proposed and is known to mediate other acyl modifications such as crotonylation. Analogous to the GCN5 acetylation mechanism, the ε-amino group is thought to be transiently deprotonated by a catalytic base within the enzyme's active site, thereby enabling the same reaction with malonyl-CoA as in non-enzymatic malonylation. However, specific enzymes known as malonyltransferases have not yet been definitively identified.

The demalonylation is catalyzed by the enzyme Sirtuin 5 (SIRT5), a class III histone deacetylase that requires NAD^{+} for activity but is inhibited by nicotinamide. SIRT5 is globally expressed in mitochondrial, cytoplasmic, and nuclear compartments, and can also remove other negatively charged acyl modifications. It catalyzes the demalonylation in the following reaction:

malonyl-lysine-protein + NAD^{+} → lysine-protein + O-malonyl-ADP-ribose + nicotinamide

Proteomic profiling of mouse liver revealed that SIRT5 regulates about 16% of all identified malonyl-lysine sites, the majority of which contain only a single malonylated lysine residue. The proteins regulated in this way are mainly involved in glycolysis, gluconeogenesis, fatty acid oxidation, and the urea cycle. The moderate reduction in malonylation observed upon SIRT5 knockdown in turn suggests the presence of additional, unidentified demalonylases. It has also been proposed that demalonylases and deacetylases function less as dedicated regulatory enzymes and more as part of a protein quality-control mechanism.

== Malonylated proteins ==
Proteomic analysis revealed malonylated proteins were enriched in pathways related to glucose and fatty acid metabolism, as well as the urea cycle, involving both mitochondrial and cytosolic enzymes. Malonylation was also detected on nuclear proteins such as histone H2B.

Below is a list of selected proteins that have been experimentally verified to undergo malonylation:

- Acetyl-CoA carboxylase 1 (ACC1)
- Carbamoyl phosphate synthetase 1 (CPS1)
- Carnitine palmitoyltransferase 1 (CPT1)
- Enolase 1 (ENO1)
- Formyltetrahydrofolate dehydrogenase, 10- (ALDH1L1)
- Fructose bisphosphate aldolase B (ALDOB)
- Glyceraldehyde-3-phosphate dehydrogenase (GAPDH)
- Histone H2B
- Long-chain 3-hydroxyacyl-CoA dehydrogenase (LCHAD)
- Very long-chain acyl-CoA dehydrogenase (VLCAD)

== Clinical relevance ==
In the metabolic disorder combined malonic and methylmalonic aciduria (CMAMMA), the mitochondrial enzyme ACSF3 is defective, which contributes to the mitochondrial malonyl-CoA pool by converting malonate. The reduced availability of the donor malonyl-CoA leads to a decrease in mitochondrial lysine malonylation. In mouse models, this hypomalonylation has been shown to disrupt key metabolic pathways such as glycolysis, gluconeogenesis, fatty acid oxidation and NADPH metabolism, ultimately impairing energy balance.

In the metabolic disorder malonic aciduria, the enzyme malonyl-CoA decarboxylase (MCD) is defective, required for the conversion of malonyl-CoA to acetyl-CoA. This leads to accumulation of malonyl-CoA and a marked increase in lysine malonylation. Proteomic and functional analyses have shown that this hypermalonylation impairs mitochondrial respiration and reduces fatty acid oxidation capacity, suggesting a direct role for protein malonylation in the disease's metabolic dysfunction. Clinical similarities between MCD and ACSF3 defects suggest their involvement in a shared pathway.

Malonylation also occurs on nuclear proteins, including histones, where it regulates chromatin-associated processes. Histone malonylation has been shown to increase ribosomal RNA (rRNA) expression and nucleolar size, both of which are features associated with cellular aging. Aged mouse tissues exhibit globally increased malonylation, potentially due to elevated expression of acetyl-CoA carboxylase and reduced activity of the deacylase SIRT5, which depends on declining NAD^{+} levels. These findings suggest a role for histone malonylation in the epigenetic regulation of aging processes.

In type 2 diabetes, lysine malonylation is significantly elevated in liver tissue, as shown in obese mouse models such as db/db and ob/ob mice. Many of the affected proteins are involved in glucose and lipid metabolism, and malonylation of glycolytic enzymes has been shown to suppress their activity, leading to reduced glycolytic flux. Six of the ten glycolytic enzymes are malonylated at sites regulated by the demalonylase SIRT5, which counteracts this inhibition and may serve as a therapeutic target, along with other yet unidentified enzymes that regulate malonylation.

In osteoarthritis, SIRT5 expression decreases in cartilage during aging while lysine malonylation increases. In mice, the combination of Sirt5 deficiency and high-fat diet–induced obesity exacerbates joint degeneration, accompanied by widespread hypermalonylation of glycolytic enzymes and impaired chondrocyte metabolism. A rare missense mutation in human SIRT5 (F101L) found in familial osteoarthritis further confirms a direct link between hypermalonylation and osteoarthritis.

In resting macrophages, glyceraldehyde-3-phosphate dehydrogenase (GAPDH) binds to inflammatory mRNAs such as TNFα and suppresses their translation. In activated macrophages, lysine malonylation functions as a regulatory signal during inflammatory responses. Inflammatory stimulation with lipopolysaccharide (LPS) increases cytosolic malonyl-CoA levels and leads to malonylation of GAPDH at lysine 213. Malonylation disrupts this binding, thereby promoting translation of pro-inflammatory cytokines like TNFα. These findings establish lysine malonylation as a link between cellular metabolism and immune activation.

Inhibition of fatty acid synthase (FASN) increases malonyl-CoA levels in endothelial cells, leading to lysine malonylation of mTOR at lysine 1218. This impairs the kinase activity of mTOR complex 1, which reduces endothelial proliferation and ultimately leads to impaired angiogenesis. The effect was seen in both normal vessel development and disease-related angiogenesis, such as retinal neovascularization in a mouse model of retinopathy of prematurity (ROP). These findings link malonylation to angiogenic regulation via mTOR signaling.

== Research ==
Malonyllysine is chemically unstable and can decarboxylate to acetyllysine upon heating, which complicates its analysis and may lead to misidentification. In tandem mass spectrometry, this reaction is associated with a characteristic 44 Da loss corresponding to CO_{2} release. To overcome this, a stable tetrazole-based malonyllysine isostere was developed that resists such decomposition. It is compatible with peptide synthesis and shows reduced but detectable recognition by malonyl-specific antibodies and SIRT5, allowing studies of malonylation without decarboxylation artifacts.

== See also ==
- Sirtuine
