= Combined malonic and methylmalonic aciduria =

Rare metabolic disease

- Other names: ACSF3 deficiency, non-classic CMAMMA
- Specialty: Medical genetics
- Usual onset: All ages
- Causes: Pathogenic biallelic variants in the ACSF3 gene

Combined malonic and methylmalonic aciduria (CMAMMA), also called combined malonic and methylmalonic acidemia (Note: The term combined malonic and methylmalonic aciduria with the suffix -uria (from Greek ouron, urine) has become established in the scientific literature in contrast to the other term combined malonic and methylmalonic acidemia with the suffix -emia (from Greek aima, blood). However, in the context of CMAMMA, no clear distinction is made, since malonic acid and methylmalonic acid are elevated in both blood and urine.) is an inherited metabolic disease biochemically characterized by elevated levels of malonic acid and methylmalonic acid. However, the methylmalonic acid levels exceed those of malonic acid. CMAMMA is not only an organic aciduria but is also defined by defects of mitochondrial fatty acid synthesis (mtFAS) and mitochondrial lysine malonylation. Researchers have suggested that CMAMMA might be one of the most common forms of methylmalonic acidemias, and possibly one of the most common inborn errors of metabolism. As CMAMMA does not show up in routine newborn screening, and symptoms are variable and often appear only in adulthood, diagnoses are frequently delayed or entirely missed, making genetic methods the key to its detection.

== Symptoms and signs ==
The clinical phenotypes of CMAMMA are highly heterogeneous and range from asymptomatic, mild to severe symptoms. In the literature (Note: Case reports are ordered by publication date from oldest to newest, and cases without genetic confirmation of ACSF3 variants were not included.), the following symptoms have been reported:

- catatonia
- congenital anomalies
- cognitive decline
- coma
- developmental delay
- diarrhea
- dystonia
- elevated transaminases
- encephalopathy, infection induced
- extrapyramidal tract involvement
- failure to thrive
- hypoglycemia
- hypotonia, axial
- infections, recurrent
- ketoacidosis
- language delay
- loss of speech
- memory problems
- metabolic acidosis
- microcephaly
- mutism
- neurodegeneration of the brain and spinal cord
- oculogyric crises
- opisthotonus
- pyramidal tract involvement
- psychiatric disease
- seizures
- skin manifestions
- speech delay
- T2 hyperintensities
- T2 signal – diffusely increased in the white matter
- T2 signal – increased in the cervical spinal cord (C2–C7)
- T2 signal – increased in the genu of the corpus callosum
- vomiting

When the first symptoms appear in childhood, they are more likely to be intermediary metabolic disorders, whereas in adults they are usually neurological symptoms.

== Cause ==
CMAMMA is an inborn, autosomal-recessive metabolic disorder caused by homozygous or compound heterozygous variants in the ACSF3 gene. This results in a defect of the mitochondrial enzyme acyl-CoA synthetase family member 3 (ACSF3), leading to reduced or complete loss of its activity. The ACSF3 gene, located on chromosome 16 at locus q24.3, consists of 14 exons and produces four alternatively spliced mRNAs that encode two isoforms of the ACSF3 protein:

- a 576-amino-acid protein (isoform 1) and
- a shorter 311-amino-acid protein (isoform 2), which begins translation at a downstream start codon relative to isoform 1.

Based on minor allele frequency (MAF), a prevalence of ~ 1: 30 000 can be predicted for CMAMMA.

== Pathophysiology ==
Schematic overview of the pathophysiology of CMAMMA.

ACSF3 encodes an acyl-CoA synthetase, which is localized in the mitochondrial matrix and has a high specificity for malonic acid and methylmalonic acid. These substrates are activated by ACSF3 through an ATP-dependent reaction, linking them to coenzyme A (CoA) and generating the thioesters malonyl-CoA and methylmalonyl-CoA. The corresponding biochemical reactions are in vivo as follows:

- as malonyl-CoA synthetase:
ATP + malonate + CoA → AMP + diphosphate + malonyl-CoA
- as methylmalonyl-CoA synthetase:
ATP + methylmalonate + CoA → AMP + diphosphate + methylmalonyl-CoA

ACSF3, whose activity also depends on magnesium (Mg^{2+}), most efficiently converts malonate and activates methylmalonate at about 70% of that rate. Lignoceric acid (C24) has been reported as an additional substrate, although in vitro studies provide conflicting results.

=== Primary effects ===
Based on the ACSF3-catalyzed reactions described above, the following subsections outline the metabolic consequences of CMAMMA, beginning with the accumulation of the upstream substrates malonate and methylmalonate, and followed by deficiencies of the downstream products malonyl-CoA and methylmalonyl-CoA:

==== Substrate accumulations ====
The defect in ACSF3 results in impaired detoxification, as malonic acid and methylmalonic acid are not converted into their CoA derivatives and therefore these substrates accumulate.

===== Malonic acid =====
The exact mitochondrial origin of malonic acid is unknown, but its transport properties are partly understood: it crosses plasma membranes only to a limited extent, with uptake increasing under acidic conditions, and within cells it enters mitochondria via the dicarboxylate carrier SLC25A10 that also transports succinate, malate, and oxaloacetate. A major proposed source is the non-enzymatic hydrolysis of cytosolic malonyl-CoA generated during de novo fatty acid synthesis, whose levels correlate with lipogenic activity. Enzymatic hydrolysis by acyl-CoA thioesterases may also contribute, alongside other potential routes such as slow carboxylation of acetyl-CoA by propionyl-CoA carboxylase, decarboxylation of oxaloacetate, oxidation of malondialdehyde, and conversion of β-alanine via malonate semialdehyde. Beyond endogenous formation, exogenous sources may also contribute from the diet, with free malonic acid occurring in plants such as legumes.

Malonic acid is an antimetabolite that acts as a classic competitive inhibitor of succinate dehydrogenase (Complex II) in the mitochondrial electron transport chain, thereby blocking succinate oxidation and impairing the citric acid cycle. This inhibition reduces mitochondrial respiration and can be cytotoxic, particularly in cells with high oxidative metabolism such as striatal neurons.

===== Methylmalonic acid =====
Propionate metabolism pathway in mitochondria, with methylmalonic acid as a by-product and the role of ACSF3 in its degradation

Methylmalonic acid accumulates to even higher levels than malonic acid, making it the biochemical hallmark of CMAMMA and places it among the methylmalonic acidemias.

The origin of methylmalonic acid is the propionate metabolism pathway in mitochondria, in which the essential amino acids valine, threonine, methionine, and isoleucine, odd-chained fatty acids, propionic acid and the cholesterol side chain are converted into propionyl-CoA. Propionic acid arises from bacterial fermentation in the gut and from dietary intake, being naturally present in certain cheeses or added as a preservative, especially in baked goods. Propionyl-CoA carboxylase forms D-methylmalonyl-CoA, which is epimerized to L-methylmalonyl-CoA and converted by methylmalonyl-CoA mutase to succinyl-CoA for entry into the citric acid cycle, a reaction that requires the coenzyme adenosylcobalamin. However, D-methylmalonyl-CoA may also be hydrolyzed by D-methylmalonyl-CoA hydrolase, releasing coenzyme A and generating methylmalonic acid, which represents a by-product of this pathway. The more unspecific mitochondrial acyl-CoA thioesterase 9 (ACOT9) can likewise hydrolyze methylmalonyl-CoA, irrespective of isomer, to methylmalonic acid, with the enzyme's activity being strongly regulated by NADH and free CoA.

But in CMAMMA, methylmalonic acid mainly derives from threonine metabolism, as shown in Acsf3 knockout mice. Moreover, methylmalonic acid was found to impair osteogenesis by inhibiting osteoblast differentiation and reducing mineralization, providing a mechanistic link to the reduced body length observed in these mice.

In vitro, a connection between free methylmalonic acid and neurotoxicity has been established.

==== Product deficiencies ====
Defective ACSF3 leads not only to accumulation of its substrates but also to reduced levels of its mitochondrial products, malonyl-CoA and methylmalonyl-CoA.

===== Malonyl-CoA =====
Malonyl-CoA is an intermediate that cannot cross membranes and therefore requires local synthesis within mitochondria. Although the exact origin of mitochondrial malonyl-CoA remains debated, the pool is thought to be provided by ACSF3 from malonic acid and by mitochondrial acetyl-CoA carboxylase 1 (mtACC1) from acetyl-CoA. Partial compensation of defective ACSF3 by mtACC1 could explain the broad clinical heterogeneity of CMAMMA. Mitochondrial malonyl-CoA is required for lysine malonylation, mitochondrial fatty acid synthesis, acetyl-CoA synthesis and incorporation into cellular lipids.

Lysine malonylation is a dynamically regulated post-translational modification in which malonyl groups are added to lysine residues of proteins, reversing their positive charge into a negative one and increasing their steric bulk. This can influence protein conformation, enzyme activity, and protein–protein interactions and has been linked to the regulation of energy metabolism, in particular glycolysis and β-oxidation. ACSF3 expression, tightly coupled to feeding cycles, controls the extent of mitochondrial lysine malonylation by regulating the availability of malonyl-CoA, which serves as the donor of malonyl groups.

In ACSF3 and Acsf3 knockout models, mitochondrial lysine malonylation was shown to be markedly reduced, confirming that ACSF3-derived malonyl-CoA is required for this modification. It has been proposed that reduction in lysine malonylation contributes more than malonic acid accumulation to the widespread mitochondrial dysfunction observed in CMAMMA.

Mitochondrial fatty acid synthesis pathway with malonyl-CoA as a key intermediate and the role of ACSF3 in its synthesis.

Mitochondrial fatty acid synthesis (mtFAS) has been described as a nutrient-responsive signaling pathway linked to acetyl-CoA utilization, respiratory chain function, iron–sulfur cluster biogenesis, mitochondrial translation, and lipid-mediated signaling processes. In this pathway, malonyl-CoA serves as the precursor of the chain extender unit malonyl-ACP (C3), which, in a condensation reaction with CO_{2} release, elongates the ACP-bound fatty acid chain by two carbons per round. It generates acyl-ACP species of different chain lengths, which fulfill distinct functions: Octanoyl-ACP (C8) is one such mtFAS product and a direct precursor of lipoic acid biosynthesis, which serves as a cofactor for several mitochondrial multienzyme complexes involved in energy metabolism, including the pyruvate dehydrogenase complex (PDH), the α-ketoglutarate dehydrogenase complex (α-KGDH), the branched-chain α-ketoacid dehydrogenase complex (BCKDH), the 2-oxoadipate dehydrogenase complex (OADH), and the glycine cleavage system (GCS). In contrast, longer-chain acyl-ACP species (C10–16) allosterically activate the network of LYRM proteins. In humans, this network comprises at least 12 proteins and regulates mitochondrial translation, iron–sulfur cluster biogenesis, and the assembly of electron transport chain complexes.

It is unclear whether lipoic acid biosynthesis is impaired in CMAMMA, as in-vitro studies have produced conflicting results on this point. However, in fibroblasts from CMAMMA patients showed lower concentrations of octanoyl-carnitine, indicating impaired mtFAS with reduced octanoyl-ACP availability. This is also consistent with decreased lipoylation of α-KGDH in all cases and PDH in some, but not all cases. Experimental knockdown models suggest that lipoylation becomes impaired only when the remaining ACSF3 activity falls below a critical threshold. This could explain the variability observed both in in-vitro studies and in the clinical presentation of CMAMMA. The overall extent of impaired lipoylation in CMAMMA is likely underestimated, since only α-KGDH and PDH have been investigated so far.

Malonyl-CoA can also be converted to acetyl-CoA by malonyl-CoA decarboxylase (MCD), providing a minor additional pathway of acetyl-CoA synthesis for oxidation in the citric acid cycle. When ACSF3 is defective, mitochondrial malonyl-CoA is reduced, which may impair the supplementary pathway from malonic acid to acetyl-CoA via malonyl-CoA. The clinical similarities between CMAMMA and malonic aciduria support the view that ACSF3 and MCD act within the same pathway.

ACSF3-derived malonyl-CoA is required for lipid synthesis, as shown by the reduced incorporation of malonate into cellular lipids in ACSF3-knockout HEK293 cells.

===== Methylmalonyl-CoA =====
Alongside malonyl-CoA, methylmalonyl-CoA is also a product of ACSF3 and likewise cannot cross biological membranes by passive diffusion. The mitochondrial methylmalonyl-CoA pool, however, is primarily provided via the propionate metabolism pathway, where it is synthesized from propionyl-CoA by propionyl-CoA carboxylase. Methylmalonyl-CoA functions as direct precursor of mitochondrial succinyl-CoA through its conversion by methylmalonyl-CoA mutase, thereby supporting anaplerotic replenishment of citric acid cycle (TCA cyle) intermediates. The importance of this anaplerosis varies with tissue type and metabolite levels and is particularly pronounced in the brain, where maintaining the α-ketoglutarate pool supports the production of GABA and glutamine. Mitochondrial succinyl-CoA is also essential for substrate-level phosphorylation in the TCA cycle, heme biosynthesis, ketone body utilization, and lysine succinylation.

In CMAMMA, mitochondrial methylmalonyl-CoA does not accumulate, a major distinction from isolated methylmalonic acidemias that may explain the absence of acute metabolic decompensation events. In line with this, the pathological post-translational modification lysine methylmalonylation, for which methylmalonyl-CoA serves as the donor, is reduced in Acsf3 knockout mice and is even lower than in healthy controls.

=== Secondary effects ===
Beyond the primary effects, fibroblasts from CMAMMA patients show reduced metabolic flexibility, which is the ability to upregulate alternative pathways for energy production. This is reflected in reduced glycolytic flux and spare respiratory capacity (SRC)—the difference between maximal and basal mitochondrial respiration—and in an increased reliance on β-oxidation for energy production. It is accompanied by reduced concentrations of anaplerotic amino acids such as aspartate, glutamine, isoleucine, threonine and leucine, which also contribute to sustaining basal respiration.

In addition, CMAMMA fibroblasts show altered mitochondrial dynamics—the balance between fusion and fission—suggesting a secondary mechanism to cope with the metabolic dysregulation. This is reflected in reduced levels of the fusion mediators mitofusin-1 (MFN1) and mitofusin-2 (MFN2) and abnormal phosphorylation of the fission mediator dynamin-related protein 1 (DRP1), resulting in mitochondria that are smaller, more numerous, and fragmented rather than elongated. Mitochondrial fragmentation increases fatty acid oxidation by reducing the sensitivity of carnitine palmitoyltransferase 1 (CPT1) to malonyl-CoA, thereby influencing cellular substrate preference and capacity, but fragmentation also enables the segregation of dysfunctional mitochondria for removal by mitophagy. As in other diseases with disturbed mitochondrial dynamics, CMAMMA is also associated with alterations of the endosomal–lysosomal system, reflected by an overrepresentation of proteins in the endosomal (15-fold) and lysosomal lumen (10-fold).

CMAMMA fibroblasts are also associated with disturbances of lipid homeostasis, affecting membrane composition and in particular lipid-mediated signaling. ceramides are reduced, while sphingomyelin—a plasma membrane component that contributes to the efficiency of signal transduction—is proportionally increased, indicating reduced sphingomyelinase activity. cardiolipins, localized in the inner mitochondrial membrane where they regulate mitochondrial dynamics and apoptosis as well as stabilize respiratory chain complexes and supercomplexes, show an altered profile with greater unsaturation and unusually long species. Their increased levels are consistent with the reduced mitochondrial spare respiratory capacity and may reflect the compensatory up-regulation of Complex IV. Beyond these bioactive lipids, structural membrane lipids are also altered, with phosphatidylglycerins decreased as precursors of cardiolipin synthesis, phosphatidylcholines reduced as major components of cellular membranes, and triacylglycerides, the main storage lipids, are increased about two-fold with altered chain length and odd-chain species arising from propionyl-CoA, accompanied by increased expression of CD36.

=== Tertiary effects ===
Patients with CMAMMA often develop neurological symptoms later in life, including seizures, psychiatric problems, memory impairment, and progressive cognitive decline. These tertiary effects suggest a link between disturbed energy metabolism and neurodegeneration. Although neural cells have a high energy demand, they cannot efficiently rely on fatty acids for energy, with the exception of certain hypothalamic neurons and astrocytes. In CMAMMA, a fibroblast study demonstrated a compensatory shift toward mitochondrial β-oxidation, a process associated with higher oxygen consumption, hypoxia, and oxidative stress. It is therefore hypothesized that chronic reliance on β-oxidation in neural tissue, together with dysregulated mitochondrial dynamics and impaired lysosomal clearance of misfolded proteins or toxic products, may drive the gradual progression toward neurodegeneration observed in these patients.

== Diagnosis ==
CMAMMA is thought to be an under-recognized disorder, as it escapes detection by newborn screening programs and presents with a wide range of clinical symptoms. In many case reports, severe or recurrent infections were the trigger for seeking medical attention, which, after further investigations, led to the diagnosis of CMAMMA.

=== Newborn screening programs ===
Newborn screenings detect possible methylmalonic acidemias in first-tier testing by elevated propionylcarnitine (C3) and abnormal ratios such as propionylcarnitine to acetylcarnitine (C3/C2) or C3/methionine in dried blood spots. However, methylmalonic acid is measured only in later-tier testing after abnormal first-tier markers, and CMAMMA is not detected by this approach because propionylcarnitine remains normal.

=== Routine and biochemical labs ===
Biochemically, CMAMMA is characterized by methylmalonic acid levels exceeding those of malonic acid. These biomarkers also allow rapid and clear distinction from classic methylmalonic acidemias in the differential diagnostic context by using the blood plasma methylmalonic-to-malonic acid ratio. The following table summarizes reported blood and urine values (Note: Clinically rounded values) of methylmalonic acid, malonic acid, and their ratio in CMAMMA patients:

	Blood plasma or serum (μmol/L)	Reference range (μmol/L)	Analytical method	Urine (mmol/mol Cr)	Reference range (mmol/mol Cr)	Analytical method	Note
Methylmalonic acid (MMA)	5-50	< 0.4	LC-MS/MS	90-230	< 3	GC/MS	Considerably lower than in methylmalonic acidemias of the types mut0, mut-, cblA, cblB and cblDv2. Vitamin B_{12} supplementation has no significant effect on methylmalonic acid levels.
Malonic acid (MA)	2-10	< 0.9	GC/MS	15-70	Below detection	GC/MS	Urinary malonic acid is not a suitable marker, as it is often missed in routine analysis due to co-elution with methylmalonic acid and low excretion levels.
MMA/MA ratio	2-6	Not defined	UPLC-MS/MS	Not suitable for ratio calculation			Clear differentiation from other methylmalonic acidemias requires measuring the ratio in blood plasma instead of urine. A ratio below 1 indicates malonic aciduria.

In CMAMMA, the acylcarnitine profile is normal, including propionylcarnitine (C3), as malonyl-CoA, propionyl-CoA, and methylmalonyl-CoA do not accumulate, and homocysteine, vitamin B_{12}, and ammonia are also within the normal range in the absence of other disorders.

=== Molecular genetic testing ===
Genomic techniques represent a key diagnostic tool for CMAMMA, especially when early biochemical detection has been missed. The final diagnosis is defined by biallelic pathogenic variants in the ACSF3 gene, which can be identified on the one hand, through targeted testing usually prompted by elevated methylmalonic acid levels and detected using specific multigene panels for methylmalonic acidemias. On the other hand, CMAMMA can also be discovered incidentally during broad genetic testing performed to investigate symptoms of unclear origin or other conditions.

Expanded carrier screening (ECS) in the context of fertility treatment can detect heterozygous ACSF3 variants, which are asymptomatic in carriers but indicate a reproductive risk when both partners are carriers.

== Treatments ==
Currently, no treatment has been conclusively shown to be effective in managing CMAMMA. The following treatment options are under discussion:

=== Dietary interventions ===
Diet interventions have been proposed to reduce the accumulation of malonic acid and methylmalonic acid, although results have been conflicting. While a 1998 case report, describing a CMAMMA patient with normal malonyl-CoA decarboxylase activity but without genetic testing for ACSF3, recommended a high-carbohydrate, low-protein diet, a later study reported no influence of protein restriction on methylmalonic acid levels. A 2025 study reports that symptomatic CMAMMA patients showed clinical improvement following dietary protein restriction and carnitine supplementation.

=== Vitamin B_{12} ===
Since some methylmalonic acidemias respond to vitamin B_{12}, treatment attempts in CMAMMA with vitamin B_{12} have been made, also in the form of hydroxocobalamin injections, which, however did not lead to any clinical or biochemical effects.

=== L-Carnitine ===
L-carnitine accepts acyl groups from acyl-CoA, releasing CoA and forming acylcarnitines that can cross membranes. In this way, long-chain fatty acids enter the mitochondria for β-oxidation, and excess acyl groups can be excreted from the cell. However, the latter is not of the same significance in CMAMMA as in isolated methylmalonic acidemias, since acyl-CoAs do not accumulate and carnitine acyltransferases cannot use malonic acid or methylmalonic acid as substrates. In addition, no deficiency of free carnitine has been observed in patients with CMAMMA. Nonetheless, one study reported clinical improvement in symptomatic CMAMMA patients following carnitine supplementation combined with dietary protein restriction.

=== mRNA therapy ===
Preclinical proof of concept studies in animal models have shown that mRNA therapy is also suitable for use in rare metabolic diseases. In this context, Moderna's therapy candidate mRNA-3705 for mut-type methylmalonic acidemia, currently in phase 1/2, is notable. While it is not targeted at CMAMMA, it illustrates the potential of such approaches for similar metabolic disorders.

== Research ==
=== Timeline ===
In 1984, CMAMMA due to malonyl-CoA decarboxylase deficiency (Note: In CMAMMA due to malonyl-CoA decarboxylase deficiency, both malonic acid and methylmalonic acid are elevated, which led to the disorder initially being referred to as combined malonic and methylmalonic aciduria. Although ACSF3 deficiency was not discovered until later, the term combined malonic and methylmalonic aciduria has now become established in medical databases for ACSF3 deficiency.) was described for the first time in a scientific literature, today known as malonic aciduria. A decade later, the first cases of CMAMMA with normal malonyl-CoA decarboxylase activity were reported in 1994 and 1998; however, the 1994 case showed an ACSF3-atypical pattern of higher levels of malonic acid than methylmalonic acid, and in the absence of genetic data the involvement of ACSF3 in both cases remains uncertain. In 2011, genetic research through exome sequencing identified the ACSF3 gene as cause of CMAMMA with normal malonyl-CoA decarboxylase, simultaneously representing the first described human disorder in the acyl-CoA synthetase family. A study published in 2016, showed that calculating the malonic acid/methylmalonic acid ratio in blood plasma offers a rapid, metabolic method for diagnosing CMAMMA.

=== Québec cohort ===
The Quebec Neonatal Blood and Urine Screening Program made Quebec province interesting for CMAMMA research, as it provided the only patient cohort in the world without selection bias. Between 1975 and 2010, an estimated 2,695,000 newborns were screened, with 3 detections of CMAMMA. However, based on this lower detection rate to the predicted rate by heterozygous frequencies, it is likely that not all newborns with this biochemical phenotype were detected by the screening program. A 2019 study subsequently reported 25 CMAMMA patients in the province of Quebec, all but one of whom came to clinical attention through the Provincial Neonatal Urine Screening Program—20 directly and four after the diagnosis of an older sibling. The urine component of the neonatal screening program was discontinued in April 2025.

== Phenotypic series ==
The following diseases also have biochemically elevated levels of malonic acid and methylmalonic acid:

- malonic aciduria
- autosomal recessive intellectual developmental disorder 69

== See also ==
- Methylmalonic acidemia
- Organic acidemia
- MECR
