= ACSF3 =

Protein-coding gene in the species Homo sapiens

Identifiers
- Aliases: ACSF3, acyl-CoA synthetase family member 3
- External IDs: OMIM: 614245; MGI: 2182591; GeneCards: ACSF3
Enzyme activity
EC #	BRENDA	ExPASy	KEGG	MetaCyc
6.2.1.76	↗	↗	↗	↗

Gene location (Human)
Chr.	Chromosome 16 (human)
Band	16q24.3	Start	89,088,375 bp
Band	16q24.3	End	89,164,121 bp

Gene location (Mouse)
Chr.	Chromosome 8 (mouse)
Band	8|8 E1	Start	122,775,486 bp
Band	8|8 E1	End	122,817,880 bp
RNA expression pattern
Bgee	Human / Mouse (ortholog); Top expressed in: mucosa of transverse colon; granulocyte; right adrenal gland; sural nerve; bone marrow cell; right adrenal cortex; left adrenal gland; left adrenal cortex; right lobe of liver; appendix / Top expressed in: Ileal epithelium; interventricular septum; cardiac muscle tissue of left ventricle; right kidney; lactiferous gland; corneal stroma; brown adipose tissue; otic vesicle; proximal tubule; left lobe of liver; More reference expression data
BioGPS	n/a
Gene ontology
Molecular function	nucleotide binding; malonyl-CoA synthetase activity; ligase activity; ATP binding; catalytic activity; acid-thiol ligase activity; very long-chain fatty acid-CoA ligase activity; methylmalonyl-CoA synthetase activity
Cellular component	mitochondrial matrix; mitochondrion
Biological process	malonate catabolic process; metabolism; fatty acid biosynthetic process; long-chain fatty-acyl-CoA biosynthetic process; fatty acid metabolic process; lipid metabolism; protein malonylation
Sources:Amigo / QuickGO
Orthologs
Databases	NCBI: entry; OMA: entry
Species	Human	Mouse
Entrez	197322	257633
Ensembl	ENSG00000176715	ENSMUSG00000015016
UniProt	Q4G176	Q3URE1
RefSeq (mRNA)	NM_001127214; NM_001243279; NM_001284316; NM_174917	NM_144932
RefSeq (protein)	NP_001120686; NP_001230208; NP_001271245; NP_777577	NP_659181
Location (UCSC)	Chr 16: 89.09 – 89.16 Mb	Chr 8: 122.78 – 122.82 Mb
PubMed search
- Wikidata
View/Edit Human	View/Edit Mouse

Acyl-CoA synthetase family member 3 (ACSF3) is a mitochondrial enzyme encoded by the ACSF3 gene. It is required for the degradation of malonic acid and methylmalonic acid and provides the precursor for mitochondrial fatty acid synthesis (mtFAS) and mitochondrial lysine malonylation. The enzyme belongs to the acyl-CoA synthetase family.

== Structure ==
The ACSF3 gene is located on chromosome 16, at locus q24.3. It comprises 14 exons and produces four alternatively spliced mRNAs that encode two isoforms of the ACSF3 protein:

=== Isoform 1 ===
Three transcript variants encode a 576-amino acid protein of about 64.1 kDa with a predicted N-terminal mitochondrial targeting sequence (MTS) comprising the first 58 or 83 residues depending on the prediction method. Experimental studies confirmed that the mature protein localizes to the mitochondrial matrix.

Observed post-translational modifications:

- Acetylation at lysine 565 (K565)

=== Isoform 2 ===
A single transcript variant encodes a shorter 311-amino-acid protein that begins translation at a downstream start codon relative to isoform 1.

== Reaction ==
ACSF3 differs from acyl-CoA synthetases that activate fatty acids by preferring the dicarboxylic acids malonate and methylmalonate, which it converts into the thioesters malonyl-CoA and methylmalonyl-CoA. Lignoceric acid (C24) has been reported as an additional substrate, although in vitro studies provide conflicting results. Despite this substrate specificity, it follows the same two-step ATP-dependent mechanism as other acyl-CoA synthetases via an acyl-adenylate intermediate:

1. Adenylation step: The carboxylate group of the substrate malonate or methylmalonate attacks the α-phosphate of ATP in its Mg^{2+}-bound form (Mg-ATP), forming the high-energy intermediate malonyl-AMP or methylmalonyl-AMP and diphosphate (PPi). During this step, the magnesium ion coordinates the β- and γ-phosphates of ATP and stabilizes their negative charges, as conserved among all acyl-CoA synthetases.
2. Thioesterification step: The thiol group of coenzyme A (CoA, often written as CoA-SH in its free form) attacks malonyl-AMP or methylmalonyl-AMP, displacing AMP and forming the corresponding thioester, malonyl-CoA or methylmalonyl-CoA.

Accordingly, ACSF3 catalyzes the following overall reactions:

- as malonyl-CoA synthetase:

ATP + malonate + CoA → AMP + diphosphate + malonyl-CoA

- as methylmalonyl-CoA synthetase:

ATP + methylmalonate + CoA → AMP + diphosphate + methylmalonyl-CoA

ACSF3 most efficiently converts malonate and processes methylmalonate at about 70% of that rate. Like other acyl-CoA synthetases, ACSF3 activity is subject to feedback inhibition by its products.

== Function ==
Analogous to the overall reactions described above, the following subsections describe the functional role of ACSF3, starting with the upstream substrates malonic acid and methylmalonic acid and proceeding to the downstream products malonyl-CoA and methylmalonyl-CoA.

=== Degradation of malonic acid ===
The mitochondrial origin of malonic acid is unknown, but it crosses plasma membranes only to a limited extent, with uptake increasing under acidic conditions, and enters mitochondria via the dicarboxylate carrier SLC25A10. A major source is thought to be non-enzymatic hydrolysis of cytosolic malonyl-CoA from de novo fatty acid synthesis, with levels correlating to lipogenic activity. Additional contributions may come from acyl-CoA thioesterases, acetyl-CoA carboxylation, oxaloacetate decarboxylation, malondialdehyde oxidation, and β-alanine metabolism. Exogenous contributions can also derive from the diet, as free malonic acid occurs in plants such as legumes.

By converting malonic acid into malonyl-CoA, ACSF3 plays a critical role in clearing intramitochondrial malonate, a potent inhibitor of mitochondrial respiration. Malonate competitively inhibits succinate dehydrogenase (SDH), an enzyme that functions both in the citric acid cycle (TCA cycle) and as Complex II of the electron transport chain. Through this activity, ACSF3 performs a metabolic editing function that prevents malonate toxicity and enables highly metabolically active cells to sustain respiration.

=== Degradation of methylmalonic acid ===
The role of ACSF3 in the propionate metabolism pathway within mitochondria.

Methylmalonic acid is formed as a byproduct through the hydrolysis of methylmalonyl-CoA in the propionate metabolism pathway and is recycled by ACSF3 to methylmalonyl-CoA, feeding back into the pathway. According to an Acsf3 knockout mouse model, threonine catabolism was identified as the major contributor to the accumulation of methylmalonic acid.

Efficient clearance of both malonic and methylmalonic acid is required to maintain mitochondrial function and to prevent metabolic acidosis. Specifically, methylmalonic acid impairs SDH activity indirectly by interfering with mitochondrial succinate import rather than by direct enzymatic inhibition. In mouse osteoblast cell models, it suppressed osteogenic differentiation and bone matrix mineralization by downregulating osteogenic marker genes, linking ACSF3-mediated methylmalonic acid clearance to bone formation.

=== Synthesis of mitochondrial malonyl-CoA ===
Since malonyl-CoA is a membrane-impermeable intermediate, it requires local synthesis within mitochondria. Although the exact origin of mitochondrial malonyl-CoA remains debated, the pool is thought to be provided by ACSF3 from malonic acid and by the mitochondrial isoform of acetyl-CoA carboxylase 1 (mtACC1) from acetyl-CoA. Mitochondrial malonyl-CoA is required for mitochondrial fatty acid synthesis, lysine malonylation and acetyl-CoA synthesis.

==== Mitochondrial fatty acid synthesis (mtFAS) ====
The role of ACSF3 in the mitochondrial fatty acid synthesis pathway.

In nutrient-responsive mitochondrial fatty acid synthesis (mtFAS), malonyl-CoA serves as the precursor of the chain extender unit malonyl-ACP (C3), which, in a condensation reaction with CO_{2} release, elongates the ACP-bound fatty acid chain by two carbons per round. The resulting acyl-ACP species serve different functions depending on their chain length: for example, octanoyl-ACP (C8) is required for the biosynthesis of lipoic acid, a cofactor of key mitochondrial multienzyme complexes such as the pyruvate dehydrogenase complex (PDC), the 2-oxoglutarate dehydrogenase complex (OGDC), the 2-oxoadipate dehydrogenase complex (OADHC), the branched-chain α-keto acid dehydrogenase complex (BCKDHC), and the glycine cleavage system (GCS). Longer-chain species (C10-16) allosterically activate the network of LYRM proteins. In humans, this network comprises at least 12 proteins and regulates mitochondrial translation, iron–sulfur cluster biogenesis, and the assembly of electron transport chain complexes.

==== Lysine malonylation ====
Lysine malonylation is a dynamic post-translational modification in which malonyl-CoA donates malonyl groups to lysine residues, reversing their positive charge and increasing steric bulk. This can alter protein conformation, activity, and protein–protein interactions, and has been linked to energy metabolism, especially glycolysis and β-oxidation. ACSF3 regulates the feeding-dependent rhythmic lysine malonylation of mitochondrial proteins by controlling the availability of malonyl-CoA, thereby modulating hepatic pathways such as glycogen mobilization, lipid synthesis, and triglyceride accumulation. The extent of lysine malonylation has been reported to vary across different cell types.

==== Synthesis of acetyl-CoA ====
The conversion of malonyl-CoA to acetyl-CoA by malonyl-CoA decarboxylase (MCD), which then can feed into the TCA cycle, completes the malonic acid degradation pathway. Simultaneously, this limits malonyl-CoA accumulation, which is thought to inhibit ACSF3 through product feedback, and thereby helps maintain malonic acid clearance via this pathway.

=== Synthesis of mitochondrial methylmalonyl-CoA ===
Methylmalonyl-CoA is also a membrane-impermeable intermediate and must therefore be synthesized locally within mitochondria. The mitochondrial methylmalonyl-CoA pool is supplied by the propionate metabolism pathway, with additional contributions from ACSF3 by activating methylmalonic acid. Methylmalonyl-CoA is required for synthesis of succinyl-CoA and lysine methylmalonylation.

==== Synthesis of succinyl-CoA ====
The conversion of methylmalonyl-CoA to succinyl-CoA by methylmalonyl-CoA mutase supports anaplerotic replenishment of TCA cycle intermediates. The importance varies with tissue type and metabolite levels and is particularly pronounced in the brain, where maintaining the α-ketoglutarate pool supports the production of GABA and glutamine. Mitochondrial succinyl-CoA is also essential for substrate-level phosphorylation in the TCA cycle, heme biosynthesis, ketone body utilization, and lysine succinylation.

==== Lysine methylmalonylation ====
Lysine methylmalonylation, a pathogenic post-translational modification, requires methylmalonyl-CoA as the donor, with ACSF3 contributing to its availability.

== Clinical significance ==
=== Combined malonic and methylmalonic aciduria (CMAMMA) ===
Pathogenic variants in the ACSF3 gene cause the metabolic disorder combined malonic and methylmalonic aciduria (CMAMMA). CMAMMA is a condition characterized by high levels of methylmalonic acid and malonic acid. The disease is typically diagnosed either by genetic testing or biochemically, based on higher levels of methylmalonic acid relative to malonic acid. By calculating the malonic acid to methylmalonic acid ratio in blood plasma, CMAMMA can be distinguished from classic methylmalonic acidemias. The disorder typically presents symptoms early in childhood, first starting with high levels of acid in the blood (ketoacidosis). Other features can include involuntary muscle tensing (dystonia), weak muscle tone (hypotonia), developmental delay, an inability to grow and gain weight at the expected rate (failure to thrive), low blood sugar (hypoglycemia), and coma. Some affected children can even have microcephaly. Other people with CMAMMA do not develop signs and symptoms until adulthood. These individuals usually have neurological problems, such as seizures, loss of memory, a decline in thinking ability, or psychiatric diseases.

=== Chronic obstructive pulmonary disease (COPD) ===
An epigenetic study found differential DNA methylation of the ACSF3 gene in fetal lung tissue exposed to maternal smoking, suggesting a potential role in the developmental origins of chronic obstructive pulmonary disease (COPD). Furthermore, integrative analyses of lung tissue DNA methylation and gene expression have identified ACSF3 as a key regulator of COPD.

=== Metabolic dysfunction-associated steatotic liver disease (MASLD) ===
ACSF3 is involved in the pathophysiology of metabolic dysfunction–associated steatotic liver disease (MASLD, formerly NAFLD). Its expression is increased in mouse models of a high-fat diet as well as in the diseases obesity and alcoholic liver disease, both of which are associated with impaired mitochondrial fatty acid metabolism and increased lipid peroxidation. Deacetylation of ACSF3 by the mitochondrial deacetylase sirtuin 3 (SIRT3) leads to decreased stability and promotes degradation of ACSF3, which, under high-fat diet conditions, improves hepatic lipid homeostasis and reduces steatosis in mouse models. The phenolic compound protocatechuic acid (PCA) has been shown to activate SIRT3, highlighting the SIRT3–ACSF3 axis as a potential therapeutic target for MASLD.

== Evolutionary role ==
The ancient human-specific regulatory variant rs34590044-A upregulates ACSF3 expression and is associated with increased height and basal metabolic rate (BMR). Anatomically modern humans show greater height and higher mass-adjusted BMR than non-human great apes, a difference interpreted as adaptation to meat-rich diets via enhanced threonine metabolism and reduced accumulation of methylmalonic acid. Functional studies in human cells and mouse models demonstrate that ACSF3 is essential for maintaining mitochondrial activity and indirectly affects osteogenesis by limiting methylmalonic acid accumulation, thereby linking human metabolism, height, and diet.

== See also ==
- MECR
