= Malonate—CoA ligase =

Class of enzymes

Identifiers
- EC no.: 6.2.1.76

Databases
- IntEnz: IntEnz view
- BRENDA: BRENDA entry
- ExPASy: NiceZyme view
- KEGG: KEGG entry
- MetaCyc: metabolic pathway
- PRIAM: profile
- PDB structures: RCSB PDB PDBe PDBsum
Search
- PMC: articles
- PubMed: articles
- NCBI: proteins

In enzymology, a malonate—CoA ligase (EC 6.2.1.76), also known as malonyl-CoA synthetase or malonate:CoA ligase (AMP-forming), is an enzyme that catalyzes the chemical reaction:

ATP + malonate + CoA $\rightleftharpoons$ AMP + diphosphate + malonyl-CoA

This enzyme belongs to the class of ligases, specifically those forming carbon-sulfur bonds as acid-thiol ligases or, more precisely, to the family of acyl-CoA synthetases.

Representatives of the malonate—CoA ligase family are required for malonate detoxification, mitochondrial fatty acid synthesis, lysine malonylation, and acetyl-CoA synthesis.

== Examples ==
The following enzymes with malonyl-CoA synthetase activity are known:

=== Acyl-CoA synthetase family member 3 (ACSF3) ===
The only known malonyl-CoA synthetase in mammals is the mitochondrial enzyme acyl-CoA synthetase family member 3 (ACSF3), which, in addition to malonate, also accepts methylmalonate as a substrate with approximately 70% efficiency. ACSF3 is required for the clearance of intramitochondrial malonate, as malonate is a potent inhibitor of mitochondrial respiration through the competitive inhibition of succinate dehydrogenase (Complex II), an enzyme that simultaneously functions in the citric acid cycle and the respiratory chain. In addition to the mitochondrial isoform of acetyl-CoA carboxylase 1 (mtACC1), which produces malonyl-CoA from acetyl-CoA, ACSF3 hereby contributes to the mitochondrial malonyl-CoA pool required for mitochondrial fatty acid synthesis, lysine malonylation, acetyl-CoA synthesis, and incorporation into cellular lipids.

=== Acyl activating enzyme 13 (AAE13) ===
Also in plants, more precisely in Arabidopsis thaliana, there is a malonyl-CoA synthetase, the acyl activation enzyme 13 (AAE13). Malonyl-CoA is required as a substrate in acylation and condensation reactions. AAE13 is localized both in the cytosol and in the mitochondria, whereby the cytosolic isoform is not essential, as cytosolic malonyl-CoA is sufficiently provided by cytosolic acetyl-CoA carboxylase. In contrast, the mitochondrial isoform is essential for plant growth.

== Clinical relevance ==
In the inborn error of metabolism combined malonic and methylmalonic aciduria (CMAMMA), the malonyl-CoA synthetase ACSF3 is defective, leading to an accumulation of malonate and methylmalonate, and to a deficiency of malonyl-CoA and methylmalonyl-CoA.
