= Glutarylation =

Post-translational modification

Glutaryl-CoA, the glutaryl donor of glutarylation.

Glutarylation is a post-translational modification of proteins in which a glutaryl group is added to an amino acid of a protiein, specifically of lysine residues. It is regulated by sirtuins, specifically SIRT5.

Discovered in 2021, it is currently documented to be involved in the regulation of metabolism, oxidative stress, chromatin remodeling, and is associated with various diseases.

== Pathology ==
Non-enzymatic hyperglutarylation is associated with disease of elevated glutaryl-CoA concentration, such as glutaric aciduria type 1.

Deficiencies in glutarylation, which may be related to deficiencies in glutaryl-CoA, are associated with impaired sperm motility in humans.
