= Glutaryl-CoA dehydrogenase =

Protein-coding gene in the species Homo sapiens

GCDH

Identifiers
- Aliases: GCDH, ACAD5, GCD, glutaryl-CoA dehydrogenase, Glutaryl-Coenzyme A dehydrogenase
- External IDs: OMIM: 608801; MGI: 104541; GeneCards: GCDH
Available structures
PDB	Ortholog search: PDBe RCSB
PDB	List of PDB id codes 1SIQ, 1SIR, 2R0M, 2R0N
Enzyme activity
EC #	BRENDA	ExPASy	KEGG	MetaCyc
1.3.8.6	↗	↗	↗	↗

Gene location (Human)
Chr.	Chromosome 19 (human)
Band	19p13.13	Start	12,891,160 bp
Band	19p13.13	End	12,914,207 bp

Gene location (Mouse)
Chr.	Chromosome 8 (mouse)
Band	8 C3|8 41.28 cM	Start	85,613,022 bp
Band	8 C3|8 41.28 cM	End	85,620,550 bp
RNA expression pattern
Bgee	Human / Mouse (ortholog); Top expressed in: right lobe of liver; apex of heart; left ventricle; right ovary; gastrocnemius muscle; left ovary; mucosa of transverse colon; body of stomach; muscle of thigh; right adrenal gland / Top expressed in: right kidney; human kidney; left lobe of liver; proximal tubule; Ileal epithelium; cardiac muscle tissue of left ventricle; interventricular septum; extraocular muscle; choroid plexus of fourth ventricle; extensor digitorum longus muscle; More reference expression data
BioGPS	n/a
Gene ontology
Molecular function	oxidoreductase activity, acting on the CH-CH group of donors; acyl-CoA dehydrogenase activity; oxidoreductase activity; glutaryl-CoA dehydrogenase activity; fatty-acyl-CoA binding; flavin adenine dinucleotide binding; glutaryl-CoA hydrolase activity
Cellular component	mitochondrial matrix; mitochondrion
Biological process	fatty-acyl-CoA biosynthetic process; tryptophan metabolic process; acyl-CoA metabolic process; fatty acid oxidation; lysine catabolic process; fatty acid beta-oxidation using acyl-CoA dehydrogenase
Sources:Amigo / QuickGO
Orthologs
Databases	NCBI: entry; OMA: entry
Species	Human	Mouse
Entrez	2639	270076
Ensembl	ENSG00000105607	ENSMUSG00000003809
UniProt	Q92947	Q60759
RefSeq (mRNA)	NM_000159; NM_013976	NM_001044744; NM_008097
RefSeq (protein)	NP_000150; NP_039663	NP_001038209; NP_032123
Location (UCSC)	Chr 19: 12.89 – 12.91 Mb	Chr 8: 85.61 – 85.62 Mb
PubMed search
- Wikidata
View/Edit Human	View/Edit Mouse

Glutaryl-CoA dehydrogenase (decarboxylating)

Identifiers
- EC no.: 1.3.8.6
- CAS no.: 37255-38-2

Databases
- BRENDA: enzyme data
- ExPASy: NiceZyme view
- KEGG: enzyme entry
- MetaCyc: metabolic pathway
- Rhea: reactions
- PDB structures: RCSB PDB PDBe PDBsum
Search
- PMC: articles
- PubMed: articles
- NCBI: proteins

Glutaryl-CoA dehydrogenase (GCDH) is an enzyme encoded by the GCDH gene on chromosome 19. The protein belongs to the acyl-CoA dehydrogenase family (ACD). It catalyzes the oxidative decarboxylation of glutaryl-CoA to crotonyl-CoA and carbon dioxide in the degradative pathway of L-lysine, L-hydroxylysine, and L-tryptophan metabolism. It uses electron transfer flavoprotein as its electron acceptor. The enzyme exists in the mitochondrial matrix as a homotetramer of 45-kD subunits. Mutations in this gene result in the metabolic disorder glutaric aciduria type 1, which is also known as glutaric acidemia type I. Alternative splicing of this gene results in multiple transcript variants.

== Structure ==
GCDH is a tetramer with tetrahedral symmetry, which allows it to be seen as a dimer of dimers. Its structure is very similar to other ACDs but the overall polypeptide fold of the GCDH is made up of three domains: an alpha-helical bundle amino-terminal domain, a beta-sheet domain in the middle, and another alpha-helical domain at the carboxyl terminus. The flavin adenine dinucleotide (FAD) is located at the junction between the middle beta-strand and the carboxyl terminal alpha-helix domain of one subunit and the carboxyl-terminal domain of the neighboring subunit. The most distinct difference between GCDH and other ACDs in terms of structure is the carboxyl and amino-terminal regions of the monomer and in the loop between beta-strands 4 and 5 because it is only made up of four residues, whereas other ACDs have much more. The substrate-binding pocket is filled with a string of three water molecules, which gets displaced when the substrate binds to the enzyme. The binding pocket is also smaller than some of the other ACD binding pockets because it is responsible for the chain-length specificity of GCDH for alternate substrates. The GCDH gene is mapped onto 19p13.2 and has an exon count of 15.

== Function ==
GCDH is mainly known for the oxidative decarboxylation of glutaryl-CoA to crotonyl-CoA and carbon dioxide, which is common in the mitochondrial oxidation of lysine, tryptophan, and hydroxylysine. The way it completes this task is through a series of physical, chemical, and electron-transfer steps. It first binds glutaryl-CoA substrate to the oxidized form of the enzyme and abstracts the alpha-proton of the substrate by the Glu370 catalytic base. Hydride is then transferred from the beta-carbon of the substrate to the N(5) of the FAD, yielding the 2e^{−}-reduced form of FAD. Thus, this allows for the decarboxylation of glutaconyl-CoA, an enzyme-bound intermediate, by breaking the Cγ-Cδ bond, resulting in formation of a dienolate anion, a proton, and CO_{2}. The dienolate intermediate is protonated, resulting in crotonyl-CoA and a release of products from the active site. Finally, the 2e^{−}-reduced form of FAD is oxidized to two 1e^{−} steps by an external electron acceptor to complete the turnover.

== Clinical significance ==
Mutations in the GCDH gene can lead to defects in the enzyme encoded by it which leads to the formation and accumulation of the metabolites glutaric acid and 3-hydroxyglutaric acid as well as glutarylcarnitine in body fluids, which essentially leads to glutaric aciduria type I, an autosomal recessive metabolic disorder. Symptoms for this disease include: macrocephaly, acute encephalitis-like crises, spasticity, dystonia, choreoathetosis, ataxia, dyskinesia and seizure and are prevalent one in every 100,000 individuals. Mutations in the carboxyl-terminal of GCDH have been most identified in patients with glutaric aciduria type I; more specifically, mutations in Ala389Val, Ala389Glu, Thr385Met, Ala377Val, and Ala377Thr all seem to be associated with the disorder because they dissociate to inactive monomers and/or dimers.

== Interactions ==
GCDH has been seen to interact with:

- glutaryl-CoA
