= GABT =

GABT may refer to:

- 4-aminobutyrate transaminase, an enzyme
- GabT RNA motif
