= Malonic aciduria =

- Other names: Malonyl-CoA decarboxylase deficiency, classic CMAMMA
- Malonyl-CoA

Malonic aciduria or malonyl-CoA decarboxylase deficiency (MCD) is an autosomal-recessive metabolic disorder caused by a genetic mutation that disrupts the activity of Malonyl-CoA decarboxylase. This enzyme breaks down Malonyl-CoA (a fatty acid precursor and a fatty acid oxidation blocker) into acetyl-CoA and carbon dioxide.

== Signs and symptoms ==
The signs and symptoms of this disorder typically appear in early childhood. Almost all affected children have delayed development. Additional signs and symptoms can include weak muscle tone (hypotonia), seizures, diarrhea, vomiting, and low blood sugar (hypoglycemia). A heart condition called cardiomyopathy, which weakens and enlarges the heart muscle, is another common feature of malonic aciduria.

== Genetics ==
Malonic aciduria has an autosomal recessive pattern of inheritance.

Malonic aciduria is caused by mutations in the MLYCD gene, located on chromosome 16q23.3. The gene encodes the enzyme malonyl-CoA decarboxylase. Within cells, this enzyme helps regulate the formation and breakdown of a certain group of fats called fatty acids.

Many tissues, including heart muscle, use fatty acids as a major source of energy. Mutations in the MLYCD gene reduce or eliminate the function of malonyl-CoA decarboxylase. A lack of this enzyme disrupts the normal balance of fatty acid formation and breakdown. As a result, fatty acids cannot be converted to energy, which can lead to characteristic features of this disorder, such as low blood sugar and cardiomyopathy. By-products of fatty acid processing build up in tissues, which also contributes to the signs and symptoms of malonic aciduria.

Malonic aciduria is inherited in an autosomal recessive pattern. This means that the defective gene is located on an autosome (chromosome 16 is an autosome), and two copies of the defective gene - one inherited from each parent - are required to be born with the disorder. The parents of a child with an autosomal recessive disorder both carry one copy of the defective gene, but are usually not affected by the disorder.

Malonic aciduria is extremely rare, evidence suggests that it is caused by the abnormality in the protein transcription regulation. Looking at the molecular basis, two distinct homozygous mutations are found to cause malonic aciduria in human. The first mutation is the transversion of gene from C to G causing a premature stop signal in the protein. The second mutation is a base pair insertion in the mature RNA that will eventually result in the protein truncation.

A research has also confirmed that the homozygous mutation which eventually leads to malonic aciduria is caused by the isodisomy of maternal UPD. This indicates that such disease is likely to be inherited from mother’s gene profile, not from paternal source.

== Prevalence ==
According to Orphanet (2006), the prevalence is less than 1 in 1,000,000.

In 1984, malonic aciduria was described for the first time in a scientific study.

By 1999, only seven cases of malonic aciduria had been reported in human in Australia; however, this deficiency predominately occurs during childhood. Patients from the seven reported cases of malonic aciduria have an age range between 4 days to 13 years, and they all have the common symptom of delayed neurological development.

By 2006, 17 cases of malonic aciduria had been published in the literature worldwide, ranging in age from 8 days to 12 years.

By 2017, less than 30 cases were known in the literature.

== Pathophysiology ==
Malonyl-CoA decarboxylase acts as a catalyst in the conversion of malonyl-CoA to acetyl-CoA and CO_{2}. Without the enzymatic activity of malonyl-CoA decarboxylase, cellular malonyl-CoA increases so dramatically that at the end it is instead broken down by an unspecific short-chain acyl-CoA hydrolase, which produces malonic acid and CoA. Malonic acid is a Krebs cycle inhibitor, preventing the cells to make ATP through oxidation. In this condition, the cells, to make ATP, are forced to increase glycolysis, which produces lactic acid as a by-product. The increase of lactic and malonic acid drastically lowers blood pH, and causes both lactic and malonic aciduria (acidic urine). Excess mitochondrial malonyl-CoA has also been shown to increase lysine malonylation of mitochondrial proteins, reflecting its role as the donor for this post-translational modification. It is also speculated that the excess of mitochondrial malonyl-CoA increases the methylmalonic acid level, which is due to an inhibitory effect on the methylmalonyl-CoA mutase.

In the cytoplasm, malonyl-CoA acts as an inhibitor of the mitochondrial outer membrane enzyme carnitine palmitoyltransferase I (CPT1), which consequently inhibits fatty acid oxidation. The inhibitory effect of cytoplastic malonyl-CoA on CPT1 varies, so it inhibits roughly 100-fold greater in cardiac and skeletal muscles than in the liver.

Some common symptoms in malonic aciduria, such as cardiomyopathy and metabolic acidosis, are triggered by the high concentrations of malonyl-CoA in the cytoplasm.

Although we have not yet gained a clear understanding of the pathogenic mechanism of this deficiency, some researchers have suggested a brain-specific interaction between malonyl-CoA and CTP1 enzyme which may leads to unexplained symptoms of the malonic aciduria.

Research has found that large amount of malonyl-CoA carboxylase are detached in the hypothalamus and cortex of the brain where high levels of lipogenic enzymes are found, indicating that malonyl-CoA decarboxylase plays a role in lipid synthesis in the brain. Disturbed interaction between malonyl-CoA and CPT1 may also contributed to abnormal brain development.

Malonyl-CoA decarboxylase plays an important role in the β-oxidation processes in both mitochondria and peroxisome. Some other authors have also hypothesized that it is the Malonyl-CoA carboxylase deficiency induced inhibition of peroxisomal β-oxidation that contributes to the development delay.

== Diagnosis ==
Screening for elevated organic acids, especially malonic acid and methylmalonic acid and for high malonylcarnitine. The diagnosis can then be confirmed by determining the enzyme activity of malonyl-coA decarboxylase in cultured skin fibroblasts. Molecular genetic testing of the MLYCD gene may also be useful.

=== Differential diagnosis ===
==== Combined malonic and methylmalonic aciduria (CMAMMA) & classic methylmalonic acidemia ====
By calculating the malonic acid to methylmalonic acid ratio in blood plasma, malonic aciduria can be clearly distinguished from combined malonic and methylmalonic aciduria (CMAMMA) and classic methylmalonic acidemia. The latter applies for both, vitamin B_{12} responders and non-responders in methylmalonic acidemia. In malonic aciduria, the results of the ratio are greater than 1, as the malonic acid value is higher than the methylmalonic acid value. In CMAMMA, on the other hand, the result is less than 1 because the methylmalonic acid is higher than the malonic acid.

== Treatment ==
A research conducted in Netherlands has suggested that carnitine supplements and a low fat diet may help to reduce the level of malonic acid in our body.

== Note ==
As both malonic acid and methylmalonic acid levels are elevated in malonic aciduria, it used to be referred to as combined malonic and methylmalonic aciduria (CMAMMA). Although ACSF3 deficiency was not discovered until later, the term combined malonic and methylmalonic aciduria has now become established in medical databases for ACSF3 deficiency.

== See also ==
- Organic acidemia
