= Glutaric aciduria type 1 =

Glutaric acidemia type 1
- Other names: Glutaric aciduria, GA1, GAT1
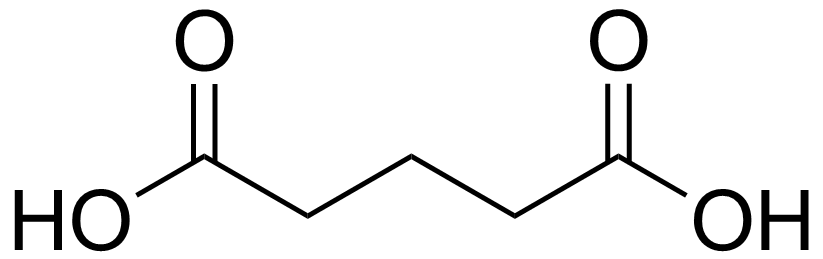
- Glutaric acid
- Specialty: Endocrinology

Glutaric acidemia type 1 (GA1) is an inherited disorder in which the body is unable to completely break down the amino acids lysine, hydroxylysine and tryptophan. Excessive levels of their intermediate breakdown products (glutaric acid, glutaryl-CoA, 3-hydroxyglutaric acid, glutaconic acid) can accumulate and cause damage to the brain (and also other organs), but particularly the basal ganglia, which are regions that help regulate movement. GA1 causes secondary carnitine deficiency, as glutaric acid, like other organic acids, is detoxified by carnitine. Intellectual disability may occur.

GA1 is an autosomal recessive disorder caused by deficiency of the enzyme glutaryl-CoA dehydrogenase (GCDH), encoded by the GCDH gene.

== Signs and symptoms ==
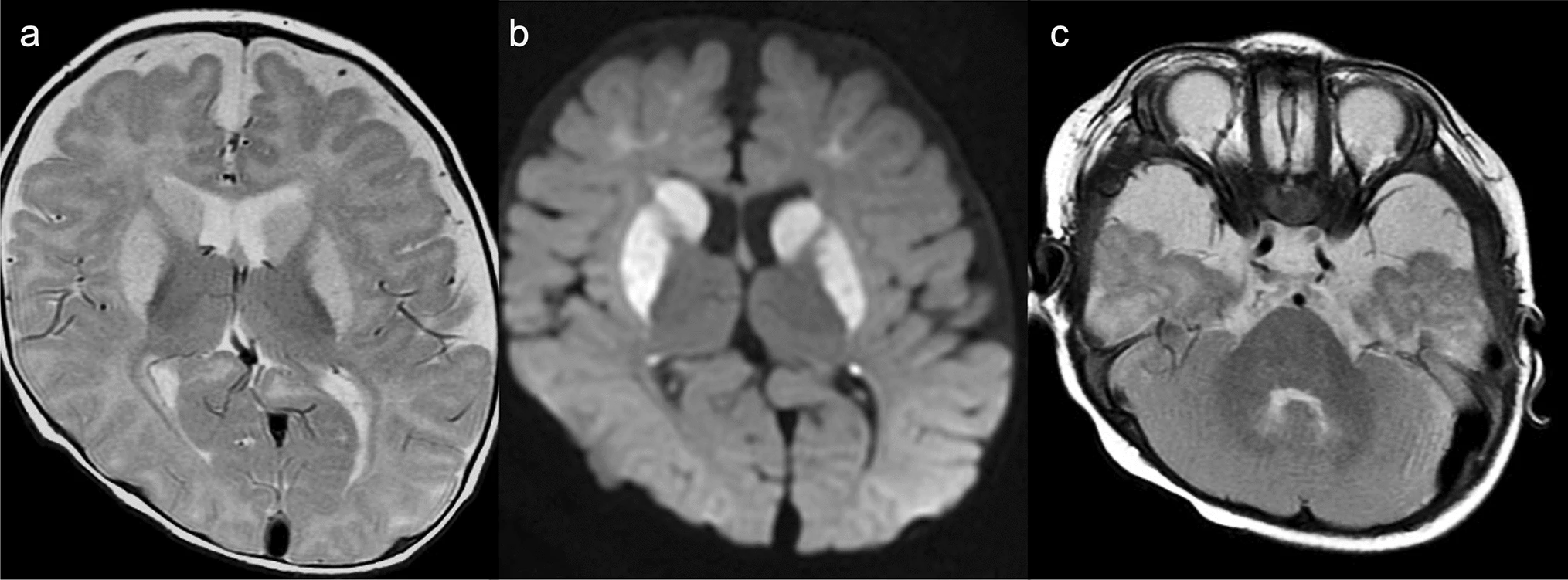
T2-weighted images (Fig.a) and DWI (Fig.b) showed increased signal and restricted diffusion of bilateral caudate nuclei and putamen. In Fig.c T2-weighted images demonstrated enlargement of the Sylvian fissures caused by hypoplasia of the temporal opercula.

The severity of glutaric acidemia type 1 varies widely; some individuals are only mildly affected, while others suffer severe problems. GA1 can be defined as two clinical entities: GA-1 diagnosed at birth or pre-birth and managed through dietary restrictions, and GA-1 diagnosed after an encephalopathic crisis. A crisis may occur under both headings, but the care of individuals diagnosed before a crisis can be managed to avoid most or all injury.

=== GA1 without encephalopathic crisis ===
==== Macrocephaly ====
Babies with glutaric acidemia type 1 often are born with unusually large heads (macrocephaly). Macrocephaly is amongst the earliest signs of GA1. It is thus important to investigate all cases of macrocephaly of unknown origins for GCDH deficiency, given the importance of the early diagnosis of GA1. Macrocephaly is a pivotal clinical sign of many neurological diseases. Physicians and parents should be aware of the benefits of investigating for an underlying neurological disorder, particularly a neurometabolic one, in children with head circumferences in the highest percentiles.

=== GA1 after an encephalopathic crisis ===
==== Neuromotor aspects ====
Affected individuals may have difficulty moving and may experience spasms, jerking, rigidity or decreased muscle tone and muscle weakness (which may be the result of secondary carnitine deficiency). GA, in patients who have suffered a crisis, can be defined as a cerebral palsy of genetic origins.

===== Occupational therapy =====
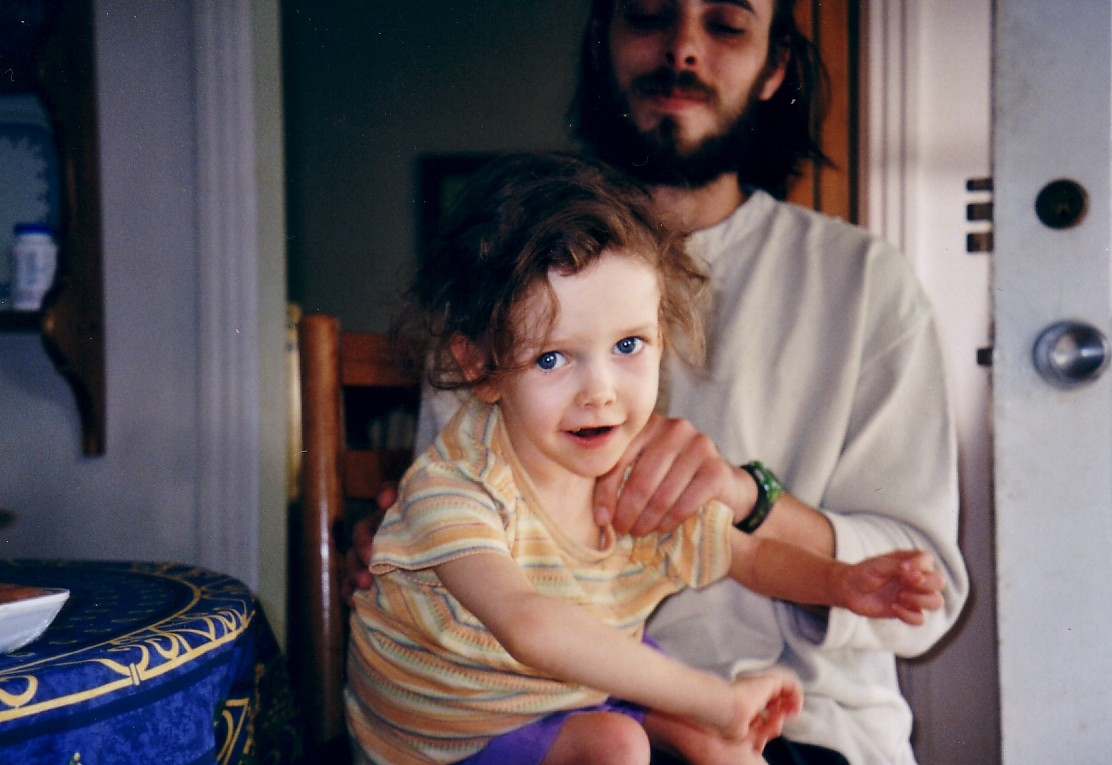
Illustration of the child with GA-I who has typical posture for this disorder.

A common way to manage striatal necrosis is to provide special seating. These special wheelchairs are designed to limit abnormal movements. However, spasticity can be worsened by constraint. Parents and caregivers can provide a more interactive occupational therapy by enabling the child to use their own excessive postural muscle tone to their own advantage.

==== Bleeding abnormalities ====
Some individuals with glutaric acidemia have developed bleeding in the brain or eyes that could be mistaken for the effects of child abuse.

== Genetics ==
The condition is inherited in an autosomal recessive pattern: mutated copies of the gene GCDH must be provided by both parents to cause GA1. The GCDH gene encodes the enzyme glutaryl-CoA dehydrogenase. Mutations in the GCDH gene prevent production of the enzyme or result in the production of a defective enzyme with very low residual activity, or an enzyme with relatively high residual activity but still phenotypic consequences.

GA1 occurs in approximately 1 of every 30,000 to 40,000 births. As a result of founder effect, it is much more common in the Amish community and in the Ojibway population of Canada, where up to 1 in 300 newborns may be affected.

Relatives of children with GA1 can have low GCDH activity: in an early study of GA1, GCDH activity was found to be 38%, 42%, and 42% in three of the four unaffected relatives tested, a pattern consistent with the 50% level that would be expected in heterozygous carriers. Those levels are close to those found in some heavily symptomatic GA1-affected children.

== Pathophysiology ==
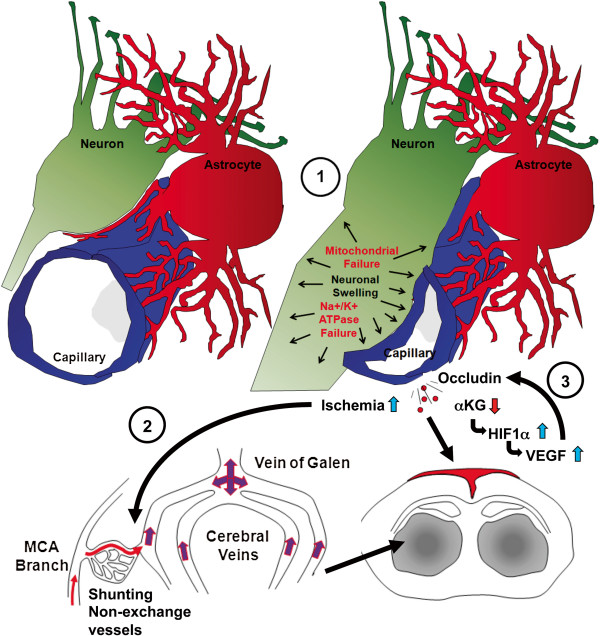
Metabolic dysfunction associated with glutaric acid production and accumulation results in mitochondrial energy failure with secondary failure of Na/K ATPases and edema initially of neurons and neuronal projections (1). Neuronal expansion impinges on capillary blood vessels leading to ischemia, which compounds and expands regions of neuronal swelling. Compression of capillaries leads to shunting of blood to non-exchange vessels with early filling and dilation of the deep venous system (2). Lack of valves in cerebral veins allows for symmetric decreased flow from striatum and thalamus. Chronic metabolic dysfunction depletes α KG levels leading to lack of HIF1a degradation and up regulation of VEGF leading to vessel expansion and weakness including mobilization of tight-junction proteins away from blood–brain barrier (3). The combination of vessel impingement, shunting and weakened blood–brain barrier likely results in hemorrhages.

Glutaryl-CoA dehydrogenase participates in the degradation of the amino acids, specifically lysine, hydroxylysine and tryptophan. This enzyme catalyzes following reaction:

$\ce{Glutaryl-CoA + FAD -> Crotonyl-CoA + FADH2 + CO2}$

This enzyme deficiency allows glutaric acid, 3-hydroxyglutaric acid and to a lesser extent glutaconic acid to build up to abnormal levels, especially at times when the body is under stress. These intermediate breakdown products are particularly prone to affect the basal ganglia, causing many of the signs and symptoms of GA1. Glutaric acid (GA) can block Na^{+}-dependent glutamate uptake by causing oxidative stress. Na^{+}/K^{+}-ATPase also gets inhibited by GA which hampers astrocyte re-uptake of glutamate, and worsens excitotoxicity; inhibition of Na^{+}/K^{+}-ATPase causes edema of neurons which capilaries, and causes dilatation of deep venous system, due to lack of valves, flow would be decreased in striatum and thalamus. Due to metabolic dysfunction, alpha-ketoglutarate gets depleted which hampers HIF1a degradation and upregulates VEGF; this upregulation causes weak blood vessels (without junction proteins) to form, an these vessels tend to cause hemorrhages. Oxidative stress gets induced by glutaric acid which in turn damages lipids, proteins and DNA. GA also activates astrocytes, can cause microgliosis which in turn causes inflammatory proceses and disrupts myelination. Another substartes that geet inhibited are mitochondrial respiraotry chain complexes (I, II, and III gets inhibited).

3-Hydroxyglutaric Acid (3HGA) like GA can cause oxidative stress, inhibition of mitochondrial complex II, and astrogliosis. 3HGA can inhibit glutamate decarboxylase which participates in synthesis of GABA, and it can account for decreased GABA.

== Diagnosis ==
Normally, magnetic resonance imaging shows the Sylvian fissure to be operculated, but in GA1-associated encephalopathy, operculation is absent. In many jurisdictions, GA1 is included in newborn screening panels. Elevated glutarylcarnitine can be detected by mass spectrometry in a dried blood spot collected shortly after birth. After a positive screening result, confirmatory testing is performed. This includes urine organic acid analysis, looking for glutaric acid and 3-hydroxyglutaric acid. Plasma and urine acylcarnitine analysis can also be informative. Molecular analysis, including gene sequencing and copy number analysis of GCDH, can be performed to confirm the diagnosis. Molecular testing can also provide information for family planning and prenatal testing, if desired.

== Treatment ==
=== Correction of secondary carnitine depletion ===
Like many other organic acidemias, GA1 causes carnitine depletion. Whole-blood carnitine can be raised by oral supplementation. However, this does not significantly change blood concentrations of glutarylcarnitine or esterified carnitine, suggesting that oral supplementation is suboptimal in raising tissue levels of carnitine. Clinical nutrition researchers have likewise concluded that oral carnitine raises plasma levels but does not affect those in muscles, where most of it is stored and used.

In contrast, regular intravenous infusions of carnitine cause distinct clinical improvements: "decreased frequency of decompensations, improved growth, improved muscle strength and decreased reliance on medical foods with liberalization of protein intake."

Choline increases carnitine uptake and retention. Choline supplements are inexpensive, are safe (probably even in children requiring anticholinergics) and can increase exercise tolerance, truncal tone and general well-being, providing evidence of the suboptimal efficiency of carnitine supplementation alone.

=== Selective precursor restriction ===
Dietary control may help limit progression of the neurological damage.

==== Lysine ====
Lysine restriction, as well as carnitine supplementation, are considered the best predictors of a good prognosis for GA1. This excludes, however, patients who already suffered an encephalopathic crisis, for whom the prognosis is more related to the treatment of their acquired disorder (striatal necrosis, frontotemporal atrophy).

==== Protein restriction ====
Vegetarian diets and, for younger children, breastfeeding are common ways to limit protein intake without endangering tryptophan transport to the brain.

==== Tryptophan ====
Formulas such as XLys, XTrp Analog, XLys, XTrp Maxamaid, XLys, XTrp Maxamum or Glutarex 1 are designed to provide amino acids other than lysine and tryptophan, to help prevent protein malnutrition.

The entry of tryptophan into the brain is crucial in the proper synthesis of the neurotransmitter serotonin in the brain. One way to acutely cause depression, bulimia or anxiety in humans, in order to assess an individual's vulnerability to those disorders, is to supplement with a formula with all or most amino acids except tryptophan. Acute tryptophan depletion is a diagnostic procedure, not a treatment for GA1. The protein synthesis elicited by the amino acids leads circulating amino acids, including tryptophan, to be incorporated into proteins. Tryptophan is thus lowered in the brain as a result of the protein synthesis enhancement, causing circulating tryptophan to drop more than other amino acids. A relative excess of other large neutral amino acids may also compete with tryptophan for transport across the blood–brain barrier through the large neutral amino acid transporter 1. The consequence is acute tryptophan depletion in the brain and a consequent decrease in serotonin synthesis.

5-Hydroxytryptophan, a precursor of serotonin that is not metabolized to glutaryl-CoA, glutaric acid and secondary metabolites, could be used as an adjunct to selective tryptophan restriction, although it has risks. However, the evidence in favour of selective tryptophan restriction remains insufficient and the consensus is evolving towards the restriction of lysine only.

=== Enhancement of precursor anabolic pathways ===
==== Lysine and hydroxylysine anabolic pathway enhancement ====
A possible way to prevent the build-up of metabolites is to limit lysine and hydroxylysine degradation, as lysine is one of the most abundant amino acids and tryptophan is one of the least abundant amino acids.

==== Interaction of GCDH deficiency with vitamin C levels ====
Humans lack the enzyme L-gulonolactone oxidase, which is necessary for the synthesis of ascorbic acid (vitamin C), leaving them dependent on dietary sources of this vitamin. Vitamin C is a necessary cofactor for the utilization of lysine in collagen synthesis. Collagen, the most abundant protein in the human body, requires great amounts of lysine, the most abundant amino acid in proteins. Ascorbic acid, the main hydroxyl radical quencher, works as the cofactor providing the hydroxyl radical required for collagen cross-linking; lysine thus becomes hydroxylysine.

GA1 worsens during stresses and catabolic episodes, such as fasts and infections. Endogenous catabolism of proteins could be an important route for glutaric acid production. It follows that collagen breakdown (and protein breakdown in general) should be prevented by all possible means.

Ascorbic acid is used to prevent multiple organ failure and to lessen mortality and morbidity in intensive care units. It thus appears reasonable to add sufficient doses of ascorbic acid to the treatment protocol during stresses and other challenges to growth in order to stimulate collagen synthesis and thus prevent lysine breakdown.

==== Tryptophan anabolic pathway enhancement ====
The conversion of tryptophan to serotonin and other metabolites depends on vitamin B_{6}. If tryptophan catabolism has any impact on brain glutaric acid and other catabolite levels, vitamin B_{6} levels should be routinely assayed and normalized in the course of the treatment of GA1.

==== Management of intercurrent illnesses ====
Stress caused by infection, fever or other demands on the body may lead to worsening of the signs and symptoms, with only partial recovery.

== Prognosis ==
A 2006 study of 279 patients found that of those with symptoms (185, 66%), 95% had suffered an encephalopathic crises, usually with following brain damage. Of the participants in the study, 49 children died and the median age of death was 6.6 years. A Kaplan–Meier analysis of the data estimated that about 50% of symptomatic people would die by the age of 25. More recent studies provide an updated prognosis whereby individuals affected can, through proper dietary management and carnitine supplementation, manage the disease with a much improved prognosis. Newborn screening has allowed affected patients to avoid crises and live full lives without any injury to the brain. It is essential that patients with the disease be diagnosed at or before birth and that all variables be strictly managed in order to maintain quality of life. When suspected and in the absence of confirmed diagnosis (through genetic sequencing), it is critical that the individual maintain a diet restrictive of all proteins and that blood sugars be monitored rigorously. The WHO now considers this disease entirely manageable.

== Epidemiology ==
GA1 can be described as a metabolic disorder, a neurometabolic disease, a cerebral palsy or a basal ganglia disorder (it may also be misdiagnosed as shaken baby syndrome). Depending on the paradigm adopted, GA1 will mostly be managed with precursor restriction or with neurorehabilitation.

So-called "orphan diseases", such as GA1, can be adopted into wider groups of diseases (such as carnitine deficiency diseases, cerebral palsies of diverse origins, basal ganglia disorders, and others); Morton and colleagues emphasize that acute striatal necrosis is a distinctive pathologic feature of at least 20 other disorders of very different etiologies, including, HIV encephalopathy–AIDS dementia complex, pneumococcal meningitis, hypoadrenal crisis, methylmalonic acidemia, propionic acidemia, middle cerebral artery occlusion, hypertensive vasculopathy, acute Mycoplasma pneumoniae infection, 3-nitropropionic acid intoxication, late-onset familial dystonia, cerebrovascular abrupt and severe neonatal asphyxia ("selective neuronal necrosis").

In a cohort of 279 patients who had been reported to have GA1, 185 were symptomatic (two-thirds); being symptomatic was seen as an indication of low treatment efficacy. Screening of those known to be at high risk, neonatal population screening and a diagnosis of macrocephaly are the ways to identify bearers of the GCDH mutation who are not frankly symptomatic. Macrocephaly remains the main sign of GA1 for those who have no relatives with GA1 and have not been included in a population screening program. GA1 is considered a treatable disease. Two-thirds of the patients who have GA1 encephalopathy will receive little benefit from the treatment for GA1 but can benefit from treatments given to victims of middle cerebral artery occlusion, AIDS dementia and other basal ganglia disorders: brain implants, stem cell neurorestoration, growth factors, monoaminergic agents, and many other neurorehabilitation strategies.
