= Metabolic flexibility =

Metabolic flexibility is the capacity to alter metabolism in response to exercise or available fuel (especially fats and carbohydrates). Metabolic inflexibility was first described as the ability to generate energy through either aerobic or anaerobic respiration or as the inability of muscle to increase glucose oxidation in response to insulin.

An organism can also be said to have metabolic flexibility if it is capable of metabolizing either carbohydrate or fat efficiently, depending on availability of those fuels. By this definition, metabolic flexibility can be quantified using respiratory quotient. This form of metabolic flexibility is reduced by insulin resistance.

With aging there is a decrease in metabolic flexibility due to a decline in pyruvate dehydrogenase activity which results in pyruvate increasingly being anaerobically converted to lactate rather than aerobically converted to acetyl-CoA. Similarly, a virus-induced cytokine storm can compromise metabolic flexibility by inactivating the pyruvate dehydrogenase complex and other enzymes. Metabolic flexibility is also relevant in cancer metabolism; in glioblastoma stem cells, fatty acid oxidation has been identified as a metabolic pathway supporting tumorigenicity, and altering lipid availability can influence this metabolic adaptation and tumor formation.

== See also ==
- Insulin resistance
