= Very-long-chain acyl-CoA dehydrogenase =

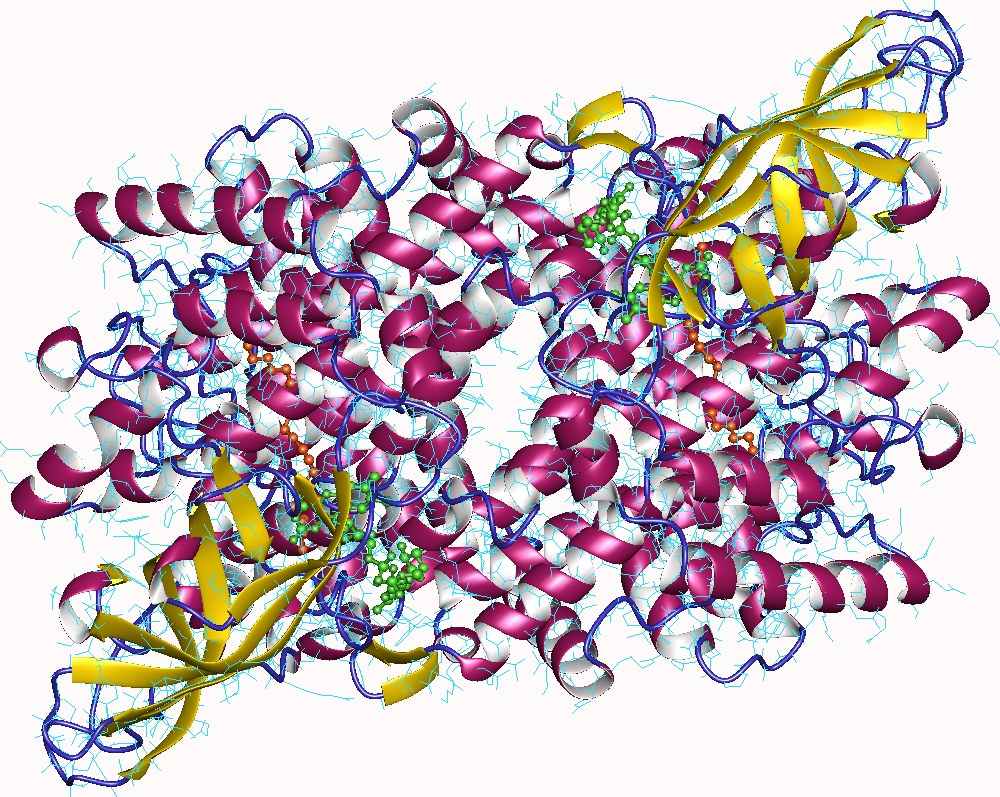
- Very long chain acyl-CoA dehydrogenase dimer, Human

Identifiers
- EC no.: 1.3.8.9

Databases
- IntEnz: IntEnz view
- BRENDA: BRENDA entry
- ExPASy: NiceZyme view
- KEGG: KEGG entry
- MetaCyc: metabolic pathway
- PRIAM: profile
- PDB structures: RCSB PDB PDBe PDBsum
Search
- PMC: articles
- PubMed: articles
- NCBI: proteins

Very-long-chain acyl-CoA dehydrogenase (EC 1.3.8.9, ACADVL (gene).) is an enzyme with systematic name very-long-chain acyl-CoA:electron-transfer flavoprotein 2,3-oxidoreductase. This enzyme catalyses the following chemical reaction

a very-long-chain acyl-CoA + electron-transfer flavoprotein $\rightleftharpoons$ a very-long-chain trans-2,3-dehydroacyl-CoA + reduced electron-transfer flavoprotein

This enzyme contains FAD as prosthetic group.
