= Non-enzymatic reaction =

Describes biochemical reactions that occur without the need for enzymes

A non-enzymatic reaction refers to a chemical reaction that occurs without the need for participation (or catalysis) of an enzyme. While enzymes act as biological catalysts that lower the activation energy needed for biochemical reactions to occur, they do not prevent the parallel occurrence of non-enzymatic reactions.

In terms of thermodynamic principles, the same reaction characteristics apply for both non-enzymatic and enzymatic reactions alike, be it that every enzymatic reaction can also occur in principle non-enzymatically. Non-enzymatic reactions have been essential in shaping the evolution of metabolic pathways, and are retained as part of many modern metabolic networks. Non-enzymatic reactions have long provided the necessary groundwork for the evolutionary selection of enzymes, given that the occurrence of non-enzymatic reactions across the metabolic landscape is not prevented by the presence of enzymes. Three classes of non-enzymatic reactions dominate the modern metabolic landscape: Class I, Class II, and Class III.

== Class I Non-Enzymatic Reactions ==
Class I reactions are grouped by their broad chemical reactivity and low specificity for metabolic targets. These include glycation reactions, Maillard reactions (e.g. in food science), oxidation reactions (e.g. driven by reactive oxygen species), and non-enzymatic, covalent modifications of lipids and proteins (e.g. alkylation, acylation). Descriptions of such reactions are detailed within the table below:

Reaction	Description	References
Glycation	The non-enzymatic addition of glucose and/or other reducing sugars (e.g. fucose, ribose) to proteins without the involvement of enzymes, which occurs as part of a physiological process within the body.	(Zheng et al., 2020)
Maillard Reactions	The non-enzymatic conjugation of amino group-containing compounds (e.g. amino acids) and sugars, which occurs as part of heat-driven browning in food (e.g. creating flavor).	(Tessier, 2010)
Non-enzymatic Alkylation	The non-enzymatic, covalent addition alkyl groups to proteins or other molecules, which is induced by endogenous metabolites.	(Zheng et al., 2020)
Non-enzymatic Acylation	The non-enzymatic, covalent linkage of a acyl group (typically provided by an acyl-CoA donor) to the amino acid residue of a protein.	(Zheng et al., 2020)
Oxidation Reactions	Non-enzymatic reactions where substrates are oxidized without the need for enzymes, primarily driven by reactive oxygen species (ROS).	(Piedrafita et al., 2015)

== Class II Non-Enzymatic Reactions ==
Class II reactions are highly specific and occur purely non-enzymatically, with a well known example of such being the maturation of vitamin D_{3} (see below). Most class II reactions are spontaneous, and proceed without the need for a catalyst or atypical energy source.

Reaction	Description	References
Maturation of Vitamin D3	The non-enzymatic maturation of Vitamin D3, where UVB radiation (e.g. hitting the skin) converts 7-dehydrocholesterol to pre-vitamin D3, which then undergoes thermal isomerization to become Vitamin D3 .	(Keller et al., 2015)

== Class III Non-Enzymatic Reactions ==
Class III non-enzymatic reactions occur in parallel to enzymatic functions and are widely observed throughout metabolism, as many metabolic pathways descend from the evolutionary groundwork laid by promiscuous or non-enzymatic precursors. Typically, the parallel enzymatic reaction exists to prevent the formation of unwanted secondary products, which would be generated by the non-enzymatic process (e.g. negative catalysis). Class III non-enzymatic reactions occur in parallel with all six major enzymatic classes (ie., oxidoreductases, transferases, hydrolyses, lyases, isomerases, ligases). Examples of such reactions are detailed within the table below:

Reaction	Description	References
Transamination	The non-enzymatic spontaneous transamination of glyoxylic acid and amino acids (e.g. in bacterial extracts).	(Campbell, 1956)
Isomerization	The non-enzymatic isomerization of proline residues (cis/trans isomerization) in a slow, spontaneous process that occurs within polypeptide chains.	(Stein, 1993)
Decarboxylation	The spontaneous, rapid, and non-enzymatic decarboxylation of aminomalonic acid to form glycine.	(Thanassi, 1970)
Formation of Oxysterols	The non-enzymatic formation of oxysterols from cholesterol.	(Iuliano, 2011)

== See Also ==
- Enzyme Catalysis
- Metabolic Pathways
