= Malonyl-CoA decarboxylase =

Class of enzymes

malonyl-CoA decarboxylase
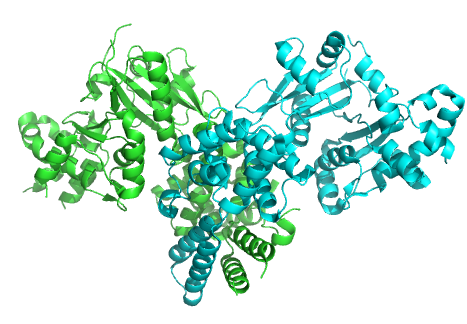
- Human mitochondrial Malonyl-CoA decarboxylase. PDB 2ygw

Identifiers
- EC no.: 4.1.1.9
- CAS no.: 9024-99-1

Databases
- BRENDA: enzyme data
- ExPASy: NiceZyme view
- KEGG: enzyme entry
- MetaCyc: metabolic pathway
- Rhea: reactions
- PDB structures: RCSB PDB PDBe PDBsum
- Gene Ontology: AmiGO / QuickGO
Search
- PMC: articles
- PubMed: articles
- NCBI: proteins

MLYCD
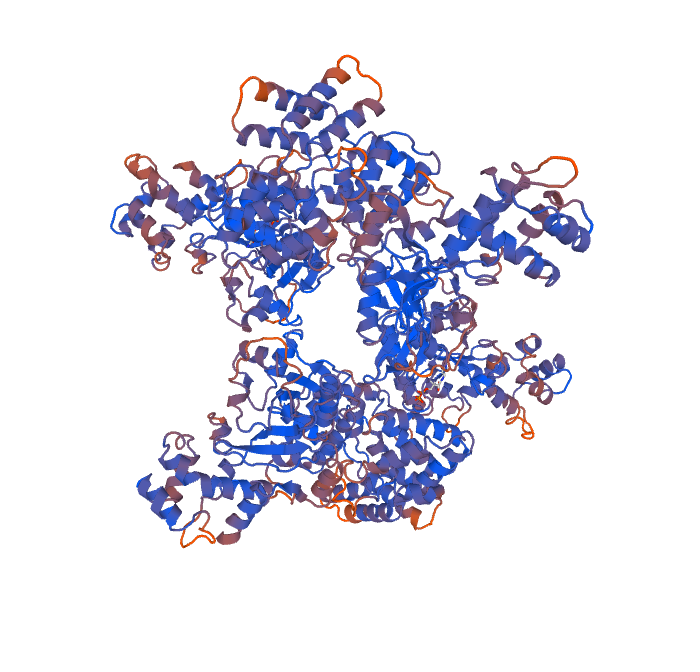

Identifiers
- Aliases: MLYCD, MCD, malonyl-CoA decarboxylase
- External IDs: OMIM: 606761; MGI: 1928485; GeneCards: MLYCD
Available structures
PDB	Ortholog search: PDBe RCSB
PDB	List of PDB id codes 2YGW, 4F0X
Enzyme activity
EC #	BRENDA	ExPASy	KEGG	MetaCyc
4.1.1.9	↗	↗	↗	↗

Gene location (Human)
Chr.	Chromosome 16 (human)
Band	16q23.3	Start	83,899,115 bp
Band	16q23.3	End	83,951,445 bp

Gene location (Mouse)
Chr.	Chromosome 8 (mouse)
Band	8|8 E1	Start	120,121,617 bp
Band	8|8 E1	End	120,137,841 bp
RNA expression pattern
Bgee	Human / Mouse (ortholog); Top expressed in: Skeletal muscle tissue of rectus abdominis; thoracic diaphragm; left ventricle; apex of heart; right ventricle; right auricle of heart; gastrocnemius muscle; Skeletal muscle tissue of biceps brachii; vastus lateralis muscle; muscle of thigh / Top expressed in: muscle of thigh; right kidney; extraocular muscle; thoracic diaphragm; plantaris muscle; soleus muscle; interventricular septum; extensor digitorum longus muscle; left lobe of liver; myocardium of ventricle; More reference expression data
BioGPS	n/a
Gene ontology
Molecular function	signaling receptor binding; carboxy-lyase activity; lyase activity; identical protein binding; malonyl-CoA decarboxylase activity; malonyl-CoA decarboxylase
Cellular component	cytoplasm; mitochondrial matrix; peroxisome; peroxisomal matrix; mitochondrion; cytosol
Biological process	fatty acid biosynthetic process; acetyl-CoA biosynthetic process; fatty acid metabolic process; lipid metabolism; acyl-CoA metabolic process; response to ischemia; regulation of glucose metabolic process; positive regulation of fatty acid oxidation; malonyl-CoA catabolic process; protein targeting to peroxisome; fatty acid oxidation; regulation of fatty acid beta-oxidation; regulation of fatty acid oxidation
Sources:Amigo / QuickGO
Orthologs
Databases	NCBI: entry; OMA: entry
Species	Human	Mouse
Entrez	23417	56690
Ensembl	ENSG00000103150	ENSMUSG00000074064
UniProt	O95822	Q99J39
RefSeq (mRNA)	NM_012213	NM_019966; NM_001364328
RefSeq (protein)	NP_036345	NP_064350; NP_001351257
Location (UCSC)	Chr 16: 83.9 – 83.95 Mb	Chr 8: 120.12 – 120.14 Mb
PubMed search
- Wikidata
View/Edit Human	View/Edit Mouse

Malonyl-CoA decarboxylase (EC 4.1.1.9), (which can also be called MCD and malonyl-CoA carboxyl-lyase) is found in humans and other animals and has important roles in regulating fatty acid metabolism and food intake, and it is an attractive target for drug discovery. It is an enzyme associated with Malonyl-CoA decarboxylase deficiency. In humans, it is encoded by the MLYCD gene.

Its main function is to catalyze the conversion of malonyl-CoA into acetyl-CoA and carbon dioxide. It is involved in fatty acid biosynthesis. To some degree, it reverses the action of Acetyl-CoA carboxylase.

== Gene ==
The malonyl-CoA decarboxylase gene (MLYCD) is located in chromosome 16 (locus: 16q23.3). This gene has 2 transcripts or splice variants, one of which encodes MCD (the other doesn’t encode any protein). It has also 59 orthologues, 1 paralogue and it is associated with 5 phenotypes.

MLYCD is strongly expressed in heart, liver and some other tissues like kidney. This gene is also weakly expressed in many other tissues such as brain, placenta, testis, etc.

== Post-translational modifications ==
Malonyl-CoA decarboxylase is firstly processed as a pro-protein or proenzyme, in which the transit peptide, whose role is to transport the enzyme to a specific organelle (in this case the mitochondria), comprises the first 39 amino acids (beginning with a methionine and ending with an alanine). The polypeptide chain in the mature protein is comprised between amino acid 40 and 493.

In order to turn into an active enzyme, MCD undergoes 8 post-translational modifications (PTM) in different amino acids. The last one, which consists of an acetylation in the amino acid lysine in position 472, activates malonyl-CoA decarboxylase activity. Similarly, a deacetylation in this specific amino acid by SIRT4 (a mitochondrial protein) represses the enzyme activity, inhibiting fatty acid oxidation in muscle cells. Another important PTM is the formation of an interchain disulfide bond in the amino acid cysteine in position 206, which may take place in peroxisomes, as the cytosolic and mitochondrial environments are too reducing for this process.

== Subcellular location ==
Malonyl-CoA decarboxylase is present in the cytosolic, mitochondrial and peroxisomal compartments. In humans, MCD has been identified in heart, skeletal tissue, pancreas and kidneys. In rats, MCD has been detected in fat, heart and liver.

== Structure ==
MCD presents two isoforms which can be transcribed form one gene: a long isoform (54kDa), distributed in mitochondria, and a short isoform (49kDa) that can be found in peroxisomes and cytosol. The long isoform includes a sequence of signaling towards mitochondria in the N-terminus; whereas the short one only contains the typical sequence of peroxisomal signaling PTS1 in the C-terminus, also shared by the long isoform.

MCD is a protein tetramer, an oligomer formed by a dimer of heterodimers related by an axis of binary symmetry with a rotation angle of about 180 degrees. The strong structural asymmetry between the monomers of the heterodimer suggests a half of the sites reactivity, in which only half of the active sites are functional simultaneously. Each monomer contains basically two domains:

- The N-terminus one, which is involved in oligomerization and has a helical structure of eight helixes organised as a bundle of four antiparallel helixes with two pairs of inserted helixes.
- The C-terminus one is where malonyl-CoA catalysis takes place and which is present in GCN5- Histone acetyiltranferase family. It also includes a cluster of seven helixes.

However, the binding site for malonyl-CoA in MCD presents a variation with respect to their homologous: the center of the binding site has a glutamic residue instead of a glycine, acting as a molecular lever in the substrate releasing.

As said before, MCD presents a half of the sites reactivity, due to the fact that each heterodimer has two different structural conformations: B state (bound), in which the substrate is united; and U conformation (unbound), where the substrate union isn't allowed. According to this, the half of the sites mechanism might present a consumption of catalytic energy. Nevertheless, the conformational change produced in a subunit when changing from the B state to the U state (which produces the release of the product) coincides with the formation of a new union site in the active site of the neighbour subunit when changing from the U stat to B state. As a result, the conformational changes synchronised in the pair of subunits facilitates the catalysis despite the reduction of the number of available active sites.

Each monomer of that structure exhibits a large hydrophobic interface with the possibility to form an inter subunit disulfide bridge. Heterodimers are also interconnected by a small C-terminus domain interface, where a pair of cysteines is properly disposed. The disulfide bonds gives to MCD the capability to form a tetrameric enzyme linked by inter subunits covalent bonds in the presence of oxidants such as hydrogen peroxide.

== Function ==
The enzyme malonyl-CoA decarboxylase (MCD) functions as an indirect via of conversion from malonic semi aldehyde to acetyl-CoA in peroxisomes. This is due to the fact that the beta oxidation of long chain fatty acids with an odd number of carbons produces propionyl-CoA. Most part of this metabolite is transformed into succinyl-CoA, which is an intermediate of the tricarboxylic acid cycle. The major alternative route by which the propionyl-CoA is metabolized is based on its conversion to acrylyl-CoA. After that, it is converted to 3-hydroxy propionic acid and finally to malonic semi-aldehyde. As soon as malonic semi aldehyde is produced, it is indirectly transformed into acetyl-CoA. This conversion has been detected only in bacteria, in the other natural kingdoms there is no scientific evidence to prove it.

Malonyl-CoA is an important metabolite in some parts of the cell. In peroxisomes, the accumulation of this substance causes malonic aciduria, a highly pathogenic disease. To avoid it, malonyl-CoA decarboxylase (MCD) converts malonyl-CoA into acetyl-CoA by decarboxylation:

malonyl-CoA
CO_{2}
acetyl-CoA

In the cytosol, malonyl-CoA can inhibit the entrance of fatty acids into the mitochondria and it can also act as a precursor for the fatty acids synthesis. Malonyl-CoA also plays an important role inside the mitochondria, where it is an intermediary between fatty acids and acetyl-CoA, which will be a reserve for the Krebs cycle.

Cytoplasmic MCD is thought to play a role in the regulation of cytoplasmic malonyl-CoA abundance and, therefore, of mitochondrial fatty acid uptake and oxidation. It has been observed that MCD mRNA is most abundant in cardiac and skeletal muscles, tissues in which cytoplasmic malonyl-CoA is a strong inhibitor of mitochondrial fatty acid oxidation and which derive significant amounts of energy from fatty acid oxidation.

In peroxisomes, it is proposed that this enzyme could be involved in degrading intraperoxisomal malonyl-CoA, which is produced by the peroxisomal beta oxidation of odd chain length dicarboxylic fatty acids (odd chain length DFAs). While long and medium chain fatty acids are oxidized mainly in the mitochondria, DFAs are oxidized primarily in peroxisomes, which degrade DFAs completely to malonyl-CoA (in the case of odd chain length DFAs) and oxalyl-CoA (for even chain length DFAs). The peroxisomal form of MCD could function to eliminate this final malonyl-CoA.

Malonyl-CoA acts as an intermediary between fatty acids and acetyl-CoA in the mitochondria, where MCD is believed to participate in the elimination of the residual malonyl-CoA, so that acetyl-CoA can enter the Krebs cycle.

MCD also plays a role in the regulation of glucose and lipids as fuels in human tissues. Malonyl-CoA concentrations are crucial in the intracellular energetic regulation and the production or degradation of this metabolite delimits the use of glucose or lipids to produce ATP.

== Pathology ==
The diseases related with MCD can be caused by its mislocalization, mutations affecting the gene MLYCD, its accumulation in peroxisomes and, mainly, its deficiency.

MCS deficiency is a rare autosomal disorder that is widely diagnosed by neonatal screening and it is caused by mutations in MLYCD. It causes many symptoms: brain abnormalities, mild mental retardation, seizures, hypotonia, metabolic acidosis, vomiting, excretion of malonic and methylmalonic acids in urine, cardiomyopathies, and hypoglycemia. More rarely, it can cause rheumatoid arthritis too.

In peroxisomes, the accumulation of MCD substance also causes pathological symptoms, which are similar to MCS deficiency: malonic aciduria, a lethal disease in which patients (normally children) have delayed development and can suffer from seizures, diarrhoea, hypoglycaemia and cardiomyopathy, as well.

Others symptoms caused by an altered action of MCD can be abdominal pain and chronic constipation.

== Regulation ==
Because the formation of interchain disulfide bonds leads to positive cooperativity between active sites and increases the affinity for malonyl-CoA and the catalytic efficiency (in vitro), MCD activity doesn't need the intervention of any cofactors or divalent metal ions.

== Medical applications ==
MCD is involved in regulating cardiac malonyl-CoA levels, inhibition of MCD can limit rates of fatty acid oxidation, leading to a secondary increase in glucose oxidation associated with an improvement in the functional recovery of the heart during ischaemia/reperfusion injury. MCD is a potential novel target for cancer treatment.
