= Glutaryl-CoA =

Names
- IUPAC name 5-[(2-{3-[(2R)-4-{[1,3-Dihydroxy-1,3-dioxo-3-(3′-O-phosphonoadenosin-5′-O-yl)-1λ^{5},3λ^{5}-diphosphoxan-1-yl]oxy}-3,3-dimethylbutanamido]propanamido}ethyl)sulfanyl]-5-oxopentanoic acid
- Systematic IUPAC name (9R)-1-[(2R,3S,4R,5R)-5-(6-Amino-9H-purin-9-yl)-4-hydroxy-3-(phosphonooxy)oxolan-2-yl]-3,5,9-trihydroxy-8,8-dimethyl-3,5,10,14,19-pentaoxo-2,4,6-trioxa-18-thia-11,15-diaza-3λ^{5},5λ^{5}-diphosphatricosan-23-oic acid

Identifiers
CAS Number	3131-84-8
3D model (JSmol)	Interactive image
ChemSpider	2338999
MeSH	Glutaryl-coenzyme+A
PubChem CID	3081383
UNII	UB84B82P7Y
CompTox Dashboard (EPA)	DTXSID30953358
- InChI: InChI=1S/C26H42N7O19P3S/c1-26(2,21(39)24(40)29-7-6-15(34)28-8-9-56-17(37)5-3-4-16(35)36)11-49-55(46,47)52-54(44,45)48-10-14-20(51-53(41,42)43)19(38)25(50-14)33-13-32-18-22(27)30-12-31-23(18)33/h12-14,19-21,25,38-39H,3-11H2,1-2H3,(H,28,34)(H,29,40)(H,35,36)(H,44,45)(H,46,47)(H2,27,30,31)(H2,41,42,43)/t14-,19-,20-,21+,25-/m1/s1 Key: SYKWLIJQEHRDNH-CKRMAKSASA-N; InChI=1/C26H42N7O19P3S/c1-26(2,21(39)24(40)29-7-6-15(34)28-8-9-56-17(37)5-3-4-16(35)36)11-49-55(46,47)52-54(44,45)48-10-14-20(51-53(41,42)43)19(38)25(50-14)33-13-32-18-22(27)30-12-31-23(18)33/h12-14,19-21,25,38-39H,3-11H2,1-2H3,(H,28,34)(H,29,40)(H,35,36)(H,44,45)(H,46,47)(H2,27,30,31)(H2,41,42,43)/t14-,19-,20-,21+,25-/m1/s1 Key: SYKWLIJQEHRDNH-CKRMAKSABC
- SMILES: O=C(O)CCCC(=O)SCCNC(=O)CCNC(=O)[C@H](O)C(C)(C)COP(=O)(O)OP(=O)(O)OC[C@H]3O[C@@H](n2cnc1c(ncnc12)N)[C@H](O)[C@@H]3OP(=O)(O)O

Properties
Chemical formula	C_{26}H_{42}N_{7}O_{19}P_{3}S
Molar mass	881.635 g/mol
- Except where otherwise noted, data are given for materials in their standard state (at 25 °C [77 °F], 100 kPa). verify (what is ?) Infobox references

Glutaryl-coenzyme A is an intermediate in the metabolism of lysine and tryptophan.

== Clinical Significance ==
Deficiency of glutaryl-CoA dehydrogenase causes glutaric acidemia type 1, an autosomal recessive metabolic disorder.In this disorder, impaired metabolism of glutaryl-CoA is associated with elevated levels of organic acids, including glutaric acid and 3-hydroxyglutaric acid.

== See also ==
- Glutaryl-CoA dehydrogenase
