= Glutaric acid =

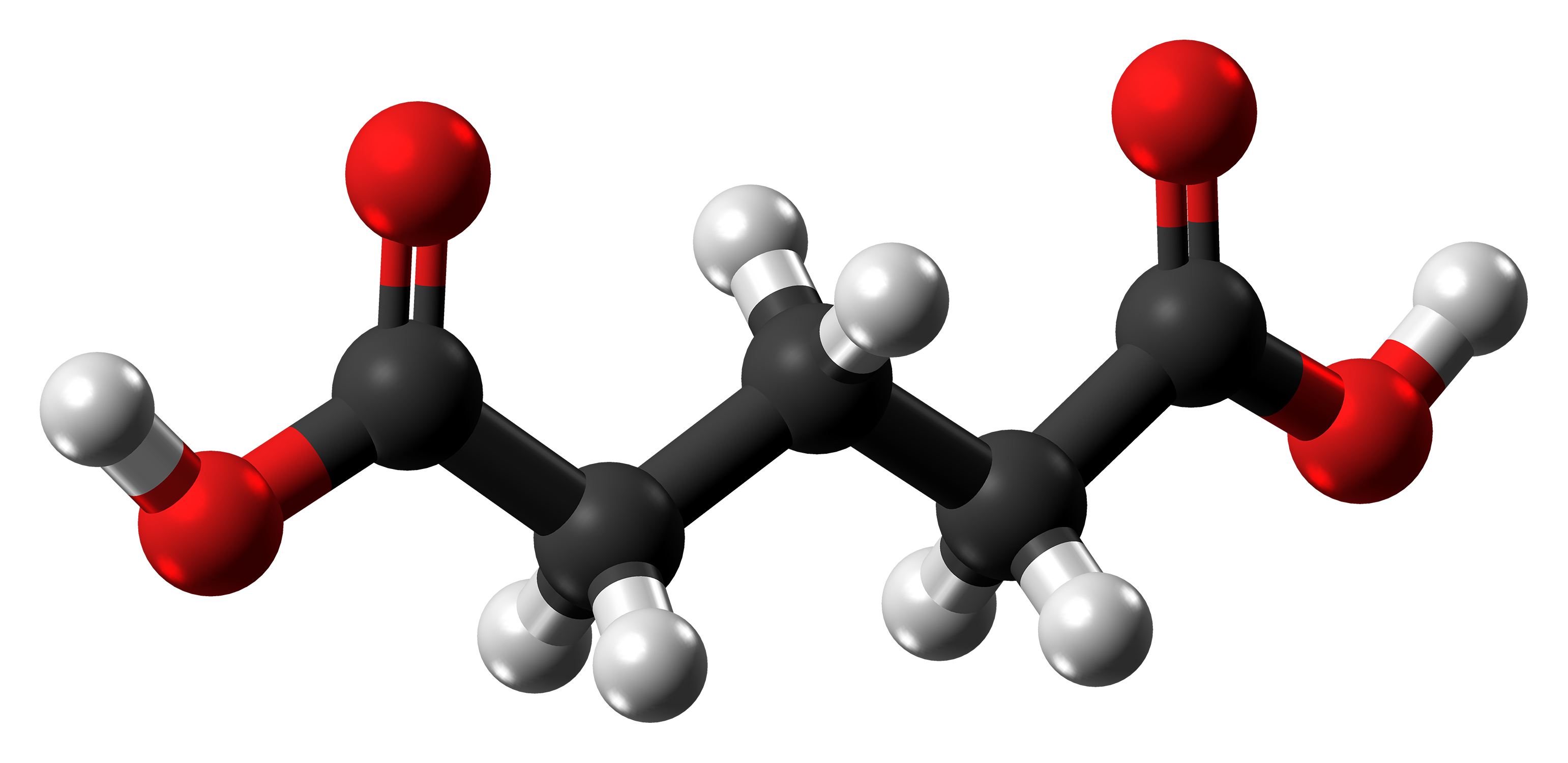

Names
- Preferred IUPAC name Pentanedioic acid
- Other names Glutaric acid Propane-1,3-dicarboxylic acid 1,3-Propanedicarboxylic acid Pentanedioic acid n-Pyrotartaric acid 1,5-Pentanedioic acid

Identifiers
CAS Number	110-94-1
3D model (JSmol)	Interactive image
ChEBI	CHEBI:17859
ChEMBL	ChEMBL1162495
ChemSpider	723
DrugBank	DB03553
ECHA InfoCard	100.003.471
EC Number	203-817-2
Gmelin Reference	26809
KEGG	C00489
PubChem CID	743
UNII	H849F7N00B
CompTox Dashboard (EPA)	DTXSID2021654
- InChI: InChI=1S/C5H8O4/c6-4(7)2-1-3-5(8)9/h1-3H2,(H,6,7)(H,8,9) Key: JFCQEDHGNNZCLN-UHFFFAOYSA-N; InChI=1/C5H8O4/c6-4(7)2-1-3-5(8)9/h1-3H2,(H,6,7)(H,8,9) Key: JFCQEDHGNNZCLN-UHFFFAOYAU
- SMILES: C(CC(=O)O)CC(=O)O

Properties
Chemical formula	C_{5}H_{8}O_{4}
Molar mass	132.115 g·mol^{−1}
Melting point	95 to 98 °C (203 to 208 °F; 368 to 371 K)
Boiling point	200 °C (392 °F; 473 K) /20 mmHg
- Except where otherwise noted, data are given for materials in their standard state (at 25 °C [77 °F], 100 kPa). verify (what is ?) Infobox references

Glutaric acid is the organic compound with the formula C_{3}H_{6}(COOH)_{2}. Although the related "linear" dicarboxylic acids adipic and succinic acids are water-soluble only to a few percent at room temperature, the water-solubility of glutaric acid is over 50% (w/w).

== Biochemistry ==
Glutaric acid is naturally produced in the body during the metabolism of some amino acids, including lysine and tryptophan. It can also arise by chain extension of α-ketoglutarate to α-ketoadipate.

Defects in this metabolic pathway can lead to a disorder called glutaric aciduria, where toxic byproducts build up and can cause severe encephalopathy.

== Production ==
Glutaric acid can be prepared by the ring-opening of butyrolactone with potassium cyanide to give the potassium salt of the carboxylate-nitrile that is hydrolyzed to the diacid. Alternatively hydrolysis, followed by oxidation of dihydropyran gives glutaric acid. It can also be prepared from reacting 1,3-dibromopropane with sodium or potassium cyanide to obtain the dinitrile, followed by hydrolysis. Using periodate, it is obtained from oxidation of 1,3-cyclohexanedione, which proceeds with decarboxylation.

== Uses ==
- 1,5-Pentanediol, a common plasticizer and precursor to polyesters is manufactured by hydrogenation of glutaric acid and its derivatives.
- Glutaric acid itself has been used in the production of polymers such as polyester polyols, polyamides. The odd number of carbon atoms (i.e. 5) is useful in decreasing polymer elasticity.
- Pyrogallol can be produced from glutaric diester.

== Safety ==
Glutaric acid may cause irritation to the skin and eyes. Acute hazards include the fact that this compound may be harmful by ingestion, inhalation or skin absorption.
