= Succinylation =

Post-translational modification

In biochemistry, succinylation is a posttranslational modification where a succinyl group (−CO−CH_{2}−CH_{2}−CO_{2}H) is added to a lysine residue of a protein molecule. This modification is found in many proteins, including histones. The potential role of succinylation is under investigation, but as addition of succinyl group changes lysine's charge from +1 to −1 (at physiological pH) and introduces a relatively large structural moiety (100 Da), bigger than acetylation (42 Da) or methylation (14 Da), it is expected to lead to more significant changes in protein structure and function.

By analogy to acetylation, it has been suggested that succinyl-CoA is the cofactor of enzyme-mediated lysine succinylation.
