= ACACA =

Protein-coding gene in the species Homo sapiens

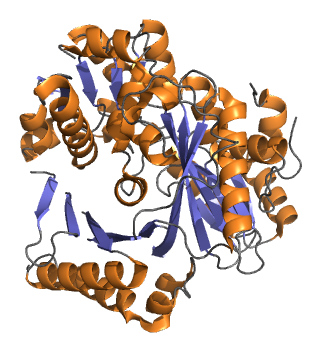

Identifiers
- Aliases: ACACA, ACAC, ACACAD, ACC, ACC1, ACCA, acetyl-CoA carboxylase alpha, ACACalpha, Acac1, hACC1, ACCalpha
- External IDs: OMIM: 200350; MGI: 108451; GeneCards: ACACA
Available structures
| PDB | Ortholog search: PDBe RCSB |
| PDB | List of PDB id codes 2YL2, 3COJ, 4ASI |
Enzyme activity
| EC # | BRENDA | ExPASy | KEGG | MetaCyc |
|---|---|---|---|---|
| 6.4.1.2 | ↗ | ↗ | ↗ | ↗ |

Gene location (Human)
| Chr. | Chromosome 17 (human) |
| Band | 17q12 | Start | 37,084,992 bp |
| Band | 17q12 | End | 37,406,836 bp |

Gene location (Mouse)
| Chr. | Chromosome 11 (mouse) |
| Band | 11|11 C | Start | 84,020,498 bp |
| Band | 11|11 C | End | 84,292,477 bp |
RNA expression pattern
| Bgee | Human / Mouse (ortholog); Top expressed in: ganglionic eminence; corpus callosum; ventricular zone; superior frontal gyrus; right adrenal cortex; prefrontal cortex; right frontal lobe; prostate; sural nerve; dorsolateral prefrontal cortex / Top expressed in: brown adipose tissue; mammary gland; white adipose tissue; subcutaneous adipose tissue; mesenteric lymph nodes; intercostal muscle; aorta; parotid gland; otolith organ; utricle; More reference expression data |
| BioGPS | n/a |
Gene ontology
| Molecular function | nucleotide binding; metal ion binding; biotin carboxylase activity; ligase activity; protein binding; catalytic activity; ATP binding; identical protein binding; acetyl-CoA carboxylase complex; acetyl-CoA carboxylase activity |
| Cellular component | actin cytoskeleton; fibrillar center; cytoplasm; cytosol |
| Biological process | carnitine shuttle; malonyl-CoA biosynthetic process; lipid metabolism; fatty acid metabolic process; cellular response to prostaglandin E stimulus; fatty acid biosynthetic process; tissue homeostasis; acetyl-CoA metabolic process; lipid homeostasis; metabolism; positive regulation of cellular metabolic process; protein homotetramerization; regulation of cholesterol biosynthetic process; fatty-acyl-CoA biosynthetic process; protein metabolic process |
Sources:Amigo / QuickGO
Orthologs
| Databases | NCBI: entry; OMA: entry |
| Species | Human | Mouse |
| Entrez | 31 | 107476 |
| Ensembl | ENSG00000278540; ENSG00000275176 | ENSMUSG00000020532 |
| UniProt | Q13085 | Q5SWU9 |
| RefSeq (mRNA) | NM_000664; NM_198834; NM_198835; NM_198836; NM_198837 NM_198838; NM_198839 | NM_133360 |
| RefSeq (protein) | NP_942131; NP_942133; NP_942134; NP_942135; NP_942136 | NP_579938 |
| Location (UCSC) | Chr 17: 37.08 – 37.41 Mb | Chr 11: 84.02 – 84.29 Mb |
| PubMed search |
- Wikidata
| View/Edit Human | View/Edit Mouse |

Acetyl-CoA carboxylase 1 also known as ACC-alpha or ACCa is an enzyme that in humans is encoded by the ACACA gene.

== Function ==
Acetyl-CoA carboxylase (ACC) is a complex multifunctional enzyme system. ACC is a biotin-containing enzyme which catalyzes the carboxylation of acetyl-CoA to malonyl-CoA, the rate-limiting step in fatty acid synthesis. There are two ACC forms, alpha and beta, encoded by two different genes. ACC-alpha is highly enriched in lipogenic tissues. The enzyme is under long term control at the transcriptional and translational levels and under short term regulation by the phosphorylation/dephosphorylation of targeted serine residues and by allosteric transformation by citrate or palmitoyl-CoA.
