= Post-translational modification =

Chemical changes in proteins following their translation from mRNA

Post-translational modification of insulin. At the top, the ribosome translates a mRNA sequence into a protein, insulin, and passes the protein through the endoplasmic reticulum, where it is cut, folded, and held in shape by disulfide (-S-S-) bonds. Then the protein passes through the golgi apparatus, where it is packaged into a vesicle. In the vesicle, more parts are cut off, and it turns into mature insulin.

Post-translational modifications (PTMs) are the covalent processes of changing proteins following their synthesis, and release from ribosomes. PTMs are reversible editing events used and carried out in the overall process of post-translational regulation – the control of the levels of active protein; an irreversible event is proteolysis (protein degradation). PTMs enable the protein's function to be diversified and extended beyond the dictates of transcription. As of 2023 there are more than 650 known types of PTM. PTMs are also prokaryotic processes.

PTMs may involve enzymes or occur spontaneously. Proteins are created by ribosomes, which translate mRNA into polypeptide chains, which may then change to form the mature protein product, which is then released from the ribosome. PTMs are important components in cell signalling, as for example when prohormones are converted to hormones.

Post-translational modifications can occur on the amino acid side chains or at the protein's C- or N- termini. They can expand the chemical set of the 22 amino acids by changing an existing functional group or adding a new one such as phosphate. Phosphorylation is highly effective for controlling the enzyme activity and is the most common change after translation. Many eukaryotic and prokaryotic proteins also have carbohydrate molecules attached to them in a process called glycosylation, which can promote protein folding and improve stability as well as serving regulatory functions. Attachment of lipid molecules, known as lipidation, often targets a protein or part of a protein attached to the cell membrane.

Other forms of post-translational modification consist of cleaving peptide bonds, as in processing a propeptide to a mature form or removing the initiator methionine residue. The formation of disulfide bonds from cysteine residues may also be referred to as a post-translational modification. For instance, the peptide hormone insulin is cut twice after disulfide bonds are formed, and a propeptide is removed from the middle of the chain; the resulting protein consists of two polypeptide chains connected by disulfide bonds.

Some types of post-translational modification are consequences of oxidative stress. Carbonylation is one example that targets the modified protein for degradation and can result in the formation of protein aggregates. Specific amino acid modifications can be used as biomarkers indicating oxidative damage. PTMs and metal ions play a crucial and reciprocal role in regulating protein function, influencing cellular processes such as signal transduction and gene expression, with dysregulated interactions implicated in diseases like cancer and neurodegenerative disorders.

Sites that often undergo post-translational modification are those that have a functional group that can serve as a nucleophile in the reaction: the hydroxyl groups of serine, threonine, and tyrosine; the amine forms of lysine, arginine, and histidine; the thiolate anion of cysteine; the carboxylates of aspartate and glutamate; and the N- and C-termini. In addition, although the amide of asparagine is a weak nucleophile, it can serve as an attachment point for glycans. Rarer modifications can occur at oxidized methionines and at some methylene groups in side chains.

Post-translational modification of proteins can be experimentally detected by a variety of techniques, including mass spectrometry, Eastern blotting, and Western blotting.

== PTMs involving addition of functional groups ==
=== Addition by an enzyme in vivo ===
==== Hydrophobic groups for membrane localization ====
- myristoylation (a type of acylation), attachment of myristate, a C_{14} saturated acid
- palmitoylation (a type of acylation), attachment of palmitate, a C_{16} saturated acid
- isoprenylation or prenylation, the addition of an isoprenoid group (e.g. farnesol and geranylgeraniol)
  - farnesylation
  - geranylgeranylation
- glypiation, glycosylphosphatidylinositol (GPI) anchor formation via an amide bond to C-terminal tail

==== Cofactors for enhanced enzymatic activity ====
- lipoylation (a type of acylation), attachment of a lipoate (C_{8}) functional group
- flavin moiety (flavin mononucleotide (FMN) or flavin adenine dinucleotide (FAD)) may be covalently attached
- heme C attachment via thioether bonds with cysteines
- phosphopantetheinylation, the addition of a 4'-phosphopantetheinyl moiety from coenzyme A, as in fatty acid, polyketide, non-ribosomal peptide and leucine biosynthesis
- retinylidene Schiff base formation

==== Modifications of translation factors ====
- diphthamide formation (on a histidine found in eEF2)
- ethanolamine phosphoglycerol attachment (on glutamate found in eEF1α)
- hypusine formation (on conserved lysine of eIF5A (eukaryotic) and aIF5A (archaeal))
- beta-Lysine addition on a conserved lysine of the elongation factor P (EFP) in most bacteria. EFP is a homolog to eIF5A (eukaryotic) and aIF5A (archaeal) (see above).

==== Smaller chemical groups ====
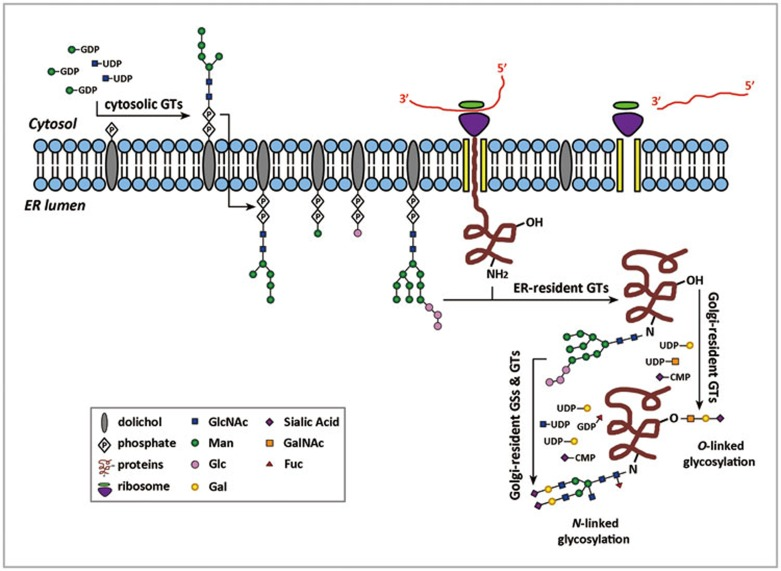
Glycosylation in PTM

- acylation, e.g. O-acylation (esters), N-acylation (amides), S-acylation (thioesters)
  - acetylation, the addition of an acetyl group, either at the N-terminus of the protein or at lysine residues. The reverse is called deacetylation.
  - formylation
- alkylation, the addition of an alkyl group, e.g. methyl, ethyl
  - methylation the addition of a methyl group, usually at lysine or arginine residues. The reverse is called demethylation.
- amidation at C-terminus. Formed by oxidative dissociation of a C-terminal Gly residue.
  - monoaminylation, addition of monoamines to glutamine residues via transamidation
    - dopaminylation, the addition of dopamine to glutamine residues via transamidation
    - histaminylation, the addition of histamine to glutamine residues via transamidation
    - serotonylation, the addition of serotonin to glutamine residues via transamidation
- amide bond formation
  - amino acid addition
    - arginylation, a tRNA-mediation addition
    - polyglutamylation, covalent linkage of glutamic acid residues to the N-terminus of tubulin and some other proteins. (See tubulin polyglutamylase)
    - polyglycylation, covalent linkage of one to more than 40 glycine residues to the tubulin C-terminal tail
- butyrylation
- gamma-carboxylation dependent on Vitamin K
- glycosylation, the addition of a glycosyl group to either arginine, asparagine, cysteine, hydroxylysine, serine, threonine, tyrosine, or tryptophan resulting in a glycoprotein. Distinct from glycation, which is regarded as a nonenzymatic attachment of sugars.
  - paucimannosylation, addition of simple glycans, primarily containing mannose and N-acetylglucosamine (GlcNAc), to asparagine residues
  - O-GlcNAc, addition of N-acetylglucosamine to serine or threonine residues in a β-glycosidic linkage
  - polysialylation, addition of polysialic acid (PSA) to neural cell adhesion molecule (NCAM)
- hydroxylation: addition of an oxygen atom to the side-chain of a Pro or Lys residue
- iodination: addition of an iodine atom to the aromatic ring of a tyrosine residue (e.g. in thyroglobulin)
- nucleotide addition such as ADP-ribosylation
- persulfidation, the addition of a sulfhydryl group onto a thiol group of a cysteine residue to form a hydropersulfide
- phosphate ester (O-linked) or phosphoramidate (N-linked) formation
  - phosphorylation, the addition of a phosphate group, usually to serine, threonine, and tyrosine (O-linked), or histidine (N-linked)
  - adenylylation, the addition of an adenylyl moiety, usually to tyrosine (O-linked), or histidine and lysine (N-linked)
  - uridylylation, the addition of an uridylyl-group (i.e. uridine monophosphate (UMP)), usually to tyrosine
- propionylation
- pyroglutamate formation
- S-glutathionylation
- S-nitrosylation
- S-sulfenylation, reversible covalent addition of one oxygen atom to the thiol group of a cysteine residue to form a sulfenic acid
- S-sulfinylation, normally irreversible covalent addition of two oxygen atoms to the thiol group of a cysteine residue to form a sulfinic acid
- S-sulfonylation, normally irreversible covalent addition of three oxygen atoms to the thiol group of a cysteine residue, resulting in the formation of a cysteic acid residue
- sulfation, the addition of a sulfate group to a tyrosine.

=== Non-enzymatic modifications in vivo ===
Examples of non-enzymatic PTMs are glycation, glycoxidation, nitrosylation, oxidation, succination, and lipoxidation.

- carbamylation the addition of Isocyanic acid to a protein's N-terminus or the side-chain of Lys.
- carbonylation the addition of carbon monoxide to other organic/inorganic compounds.
- glycation, the addition of a sugar molecule to a protein without the controlling action of an enzyme.
- glutarylation, the addition of a glutaryl group to lysine residues
- malonylation, the addition of a malonyl group to lysine residues
- methylmalonylation, the addition of a methylmalonyl group to lysine residues
- spontaneous isopeptide bond formation, between lysine and aspartic acid or asparagine, as found in many surface proteins of Gram-positive bacteria.
- succinylation, addition of a succinyl group to lysine

=== Non-enzymatic additions in vitro ===
- biotinylation: covalent attachment of a biotin moiety using a biotinylation reagent, typically for the purpose of labeling a protein.
- carbamylation: the addition of isocyanic acid to a protein's N-terminus or the side-chain of Lys or Cys residues, typically resulting from exposure to urea solutions.
- oxidation: addition of one or more oxygen atoms to a susceptible side-chain, principally of Met, Trp, His or Cys residues. Formation of disulfide bonds between Cys residues.
- pegylation: covalent attachment of polyethylene glycol (PEG) using a pegylation reagent, typically to the N-terminus or the side-chains of Lys residues. Pegylation is used to improve the efficacy of protein pharmaceuticals.

== Conjugation with other proteins or peptides ==
- ubiquitination, the covalent linkage to the protein ubiquitin.
- SUMOylation, the covalent linkage to the SUMO protein (small ubiquitin-related modifier)
- neddylation, the covalent linkage to the Nedd protein
- ISGylation, the covalent linkage to the ISG15 protein (interferon-stimulated gene 15)
- pupylation, the covalent linkage to the prokaryotic ubiquitin-like protein

== Chemical modification of amino acids ==
- citrullination, or deimination, the conversion of arginine to citrulline
- deamidation, the conversion of glutamine to glutamic acid or asparagine to aspartic acid
- eliminylation, the conversion to an alkene by beta-elimination of phosphothreonine and phosphoserine, or dehydration of threonine and serine

== Structural changes ==
- disulfide bridges, the covalent linkage of two cysteine amino acids
- lysine-cysteine bridges, the covalent linkage of 1 lysine and 1 or 2 cysteine residues via an oxygen atom (NOS and SONOS bridges)
- proteolytic cleavage, cleavage of a protein at a peptide bond
- isoaspartate formation, via the cyclisation of asparagine or aspartic acid amino-acid residues
- racemization
  - of serine by protein-serine epimerase
  - of alanine in dermorphin, a frog opioid peptide
  - of methionine in deltorphin, also a frog opioid peptide
- protein splicing, self-catalytic removal of inteins analogous to mRNA processing

== Statistics ==
=== Common PTMs by frequency ===
In 2011, statistics of each post-translational modification experimentally and putatively detected have been compiled using proteome-wide information from the Swiss-Prot database. The 10 most common experimentally found modifications were as follows:

Frequency	Modification
58383	Phosphorylation
6751	Acetylation
5526	N-linked glycosylation
2844	Amidation
1619	Hydroxylation
1523	Methylation
1133	O-linked glycosylation
878	Ubiquitylation
826	Pyrrolidone carboxylic acid
504	Sulfation

=== Common PTMs by residue ===
Some common post-translational modifications to specific amino-acid residues are shown below. Modifications occur on the side-chain unless indicated otherwise.

Amino Acid	Abbrev.	Modification
Alanine	Ala or A	N-acetylation (N-terminus)
Arginine	Arg or R	deimination to citrulline, methylation
Asparagine	Asn or N	deamidation to Asp or iso(Asp), N-linked glycosylation, spontaneous isopeptide bond formation
Aspartic acid	Asp or D	isomerization to isoaspartic acid, spontaneous isopeptide bond formation
Cysteine	Cys or C	disulfide bond formation, oxidation to sulfenic, sulfinic or sulfonic acid, palmitoylation, N-acetylation (N-terminus), S-nitrosylation
Glutamine	Gln or Q	cyclization to pyroglutamic acid (N-terminus), deamidation to glutamic acid or isopeptide bond formation to a lysine by a transglutaminase
Glutamic acid	Glu or E	cyclization to pyroglutamic acid (N-terminus), gamma-carboxylation
Glycine	Gly or G	N-myristoylation (N-terminus), N-acetylation (N-terminus)
Histidine	His or H	phosphorylation
Isoleucine	Ile or I	
Leucine	Leu or L	
Lysine	Lys or K	acetylation, ubiquitylation, SUMOylation, methylation, hydroxylation leading to allysine, spontaneous isopeptide bond formation
Methionine	Met or M	N-acetylation (N-terminus), N-linked ubiquitination, oxidation to sulfoxide or sulfone
Phenylalanine	Phe or F	
Proline	Pro or P	hydroxylation
Serine	Ser or S	phosphorylation, O-linked glycosylation, N-acetylation (N-terminus)
Threonine	Thr or T	phosphorylation, O-linked glycosylation, N-acetylation (N-terminus)
Tryptophan	Trp or W	mono- or di-oxidation, formation of kynurenine, tryptophan tryptophylquinone
Tyrosine	Tyr or Y	sulfation, phosphorylation
Valine	Val or V	N-acetylation (N-terminus)

== Databases and tools ==
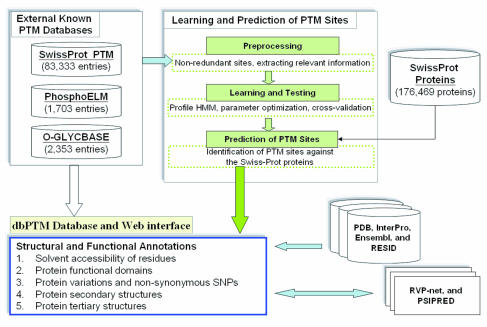
Flowchart of the process and the data sources to predict PTMs

Protein sequences contain sequence motifs that are recognized by modifying enzymes, and which can be documented or predicted in PTM databases. With the large number of different modifications being discovered, there is a need to document this sort of information in databases. PTM information can be collected through experimental means or predicted from high-quality, manually curated data. Numerous databases have been created, often with a focus on certain taxonomic groups (e.g. human proteins) or other features.

=== List of resources ===
- PhosphoSitePlus – A database of comprehensive information and tools for the study of mammalian protein post-translational modification
- ProteomeScout – A database of proteins and post-translational modifications experimentally
- Human Protein Reference Database – A database for different modifications and understand different proteins, their class, and function/process related to disease causing proteins
- PROSITE – A database of Consensus patterns for many types of PTM's including sites
- RESID – A database consisting of a collection of annotations and structures for PTMs.
- iPTMnet – A database that integrates PTM information from several knowledgbases and text mining results.
- dbPTM – A database that shows different PTM's and information regarding their chemical components/structures and a frequency for amino acid modified site
- Uniprot has PTM information although that may be less comprehensive than in more specialized databases.
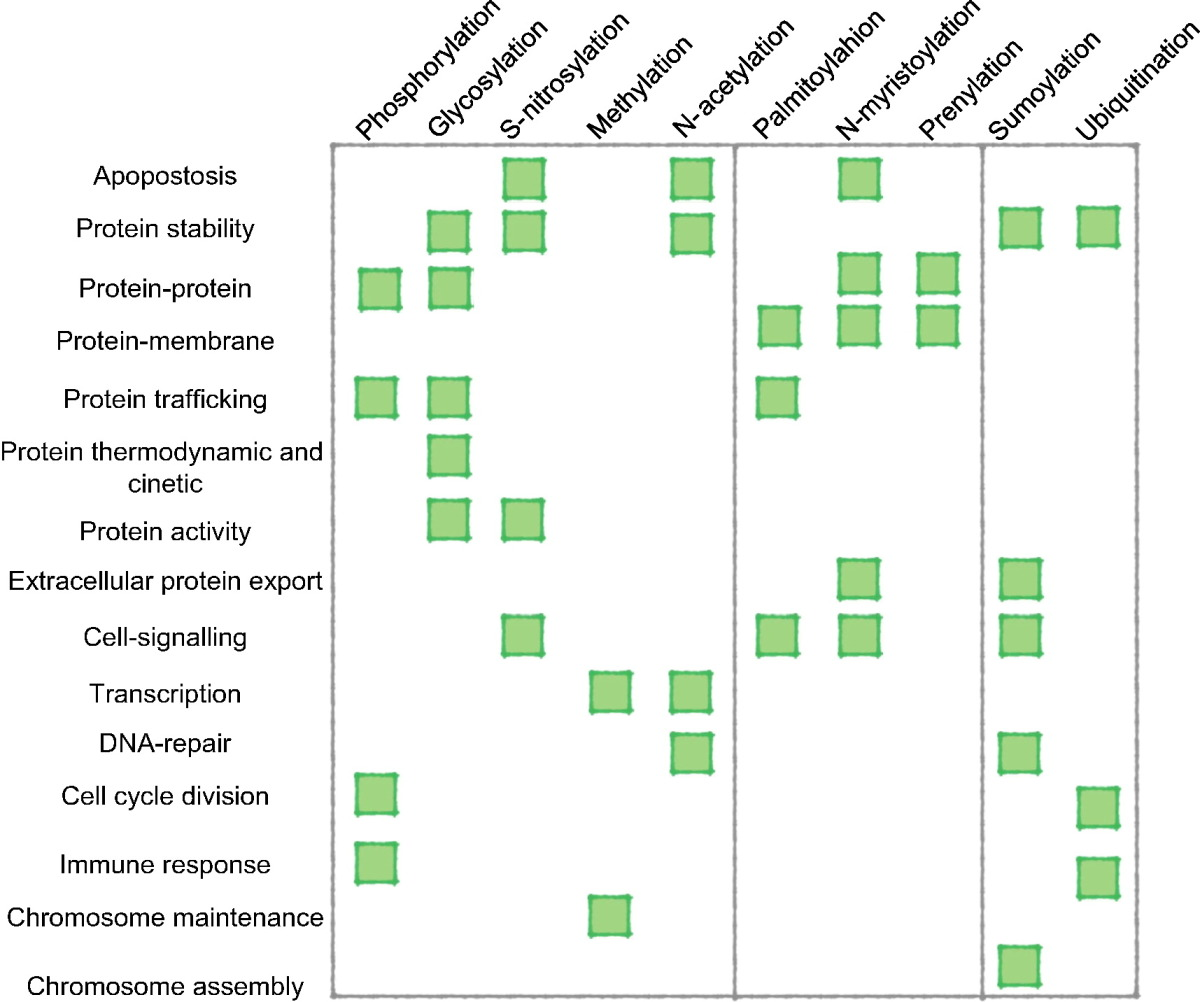
  Effect of PTMs on protein function and physiological processes
- The O-GlcNAc Database – A curated database for protein O-GlcNAcylation and referencing more than 14 000 protein entries and 10 000 O-GlcNAc sites.

=== Tools ===
List of software for visualization of proteins and their PTMs

- PyMOL – introduce a set of common PTM's into protein models
- AWESOME – Interactive tool to see the role of single nucleotide polymorphisms to PTM's
- Chimera – Interactive Database to visualize molecules

== Case examples ==
- Cleavage and formation of disulfide bridges during the production of insulin
- PTM of histones as regulation of transcription: RNA polymerase control by chromatin structure
- PTM of RNA polymerase II as regulation of transcription
- Cleavage of polypeptide chains as crucial for lectin specificity
- Influence of Ni(II) in the Acetylation of Histones H4 Protein

== See also ==
- Protein targeting
- Post-translational regulation
