= Methylmalonic acid =

Names
- Preferred IUPAC name Methylpropanedioic acid
- Other names Methylmalonic acid

Identifiers
CAS Number	516-05-2
3D model (JSmol)	Interactive image
ChEBI	CHEBI:30860
ChemSpider	473
ECHA InfoCard	100.007.473
EC Number	208-219-5
KEGG	C02170
MeSH	Methylmalonic+acid
PubChem CID	487
UNII	8LL8S712J7
CompTox Dashboard (EPA)	DTXSID00199549
- InChI: InChI=1S/C4H6O4/c1-2(3(5)6)4(7)8/h2H,1H3,(H,5,6)(H,7,8) Key: ZIYVHBGGAOATLY-UHFFFAOYSA-N; InChI=1/C4H6O4/c1-2(3(5)6)4(7)8/h2H,1H3,(H,5,6)(H,7,8) Key: ZIYVHBGGAOATLY-UHFFFAOYAT
- SMILES: CC(C(=O)O)C(=O)O

Properties
Chemical formula	C_{4}H_{6}O_{4}
Molar mass	118.088 g/mol
Density	1.455 g/cm^{−3}
Melting point	134 °C (273 °F; 407 K)
Acidity (pK_{a})	pK_{a1} = 3,07 pK_{a2} = 5,76
- Except where otherwise noted, data are given for materials in their standard state (at 25 °C [77 °F], 100 kPa). verify (what is ?) Infobox references

Methylmalonic acid (MMA) is a chemical compound from the group of dicarboxylic acids. It consists of the basic structure of malonic acid and also carries a methyl group. The salts of methylmalonic acid are called methylmalonates.

== Metabolism ==
Propionate metabolism pathway with methylmalonic acid as a by-product

Methylmalonic acid is a by-product of the propionate metabolism pathway. The starting sources for this are the following with the respective approximate contributions to whole body propionate metabolism in brackets:

- essential amino acids: methionine, valine, threonine and isoleucine (~ 50%)
- odd-chain fatty acids (~ 30%)
- propionic acid from bacterial fermentation (~ 20%)
- cholesterol side chain
- thymine

The propionate derivative, propionyl-CoA, is converted into D-methylmalonyl-CoA by propionyl-CoA carboxylase and then converted into L-methylmalonyl-CoA by methylmalonyl-CoA epimerase. Entry into the citric acid cycle occurs through the conversion of L-methylmalonyl-CoA into succinyl-CoA by L-methylmalonyl-CoA mutase, whereby vitamin B_{12} in the form of adenosylcobalamin is required as a coenzyme. This degradation pathway from propionyl-CoA to succinyl-CoA represents one of the most important anaplerotic pathways of the citric acid cycle. Methylmalonic acid is formed as a by-product of this metabolic pathway when D-methylmalonyl-CoA is cleaved into methylmalonic acid and CoA by D-methylmalonyl-CoA hydrolase. The enzyme acyl-CoA synthetase family member 3 (ACSF3) is in turn responsible for the conversion of methylmalonic acid and CoA to methylmalonyl-CoA.

== Clinical relevance ==
=== Vitamin B_{12} deficiency ===
Increased methylmalonic acid levels may indicate a vitamin B_{12} deficiency. The test is highly sensitive (those with vitamin B_{12} deficiency almost always have raised levels) but not very specific (those that do not have vitamin B_{12} deficiency may have raised levels too). Methylmalonic acid is elevated in 90–98% of patients with vitamin B_{12} deficiency. It has lower specificity since 20–25% of patients over the age of 70 have elevated levels of methylmalonic acid, but 25–33% of them do not have B_{12} deficiency. For this reason, the testing of methylmalonic acid levels is not routinely recommended in the elderly.

=== Metabolic diseases ===
An excess is associated with methylmalonic acidemias.

If elevated methylmalonic acid levels are accompanied by elevated malonic acid levels, this may indicate the metabolic disease combined malonic and methylmalonic aciduria (CMAMMA). By calculating the malonic acid to methylmalonic acid ratio in blood plasma, CMAMMA can be distinguished from classic methylmalonic acidemia.

=== Cancer ===
Moreover, methylmalonic acid accumulation in the blood with age has been linked with tumour progression in 2020.

=== Bacterial overgrowth in the small intestine ===
Bacterial overgrowth in the small intestine can also lead to elevated levels of methylmalonic acid due to the competition of bacteria in the absorption process of vitamin B_{12}. This is true of vitamin B_{12} from food and oral supplementation and can be circumvented by vitamin B_{12} injections. It is also hypothesized from case studies of patients with short bowel syndrome that intestinal bacterial overgrowth leads to increased production of propionic acid, which is a precursor to methylmalonic acid. It has been shown that in these cases, methylmalonic acid levels returned to normal with the administration of metronidazole.

=== Biomarker for nitrous oxide toxicity ===
Nitrous oxide oxidizes the cobalt in vitamin B_{12}. When B_{12} -dependent methylmalonyl-CoA mutase is disrupted, methylmalonic acid accumulates in the blood. Methylmalonic acid reliably reflects B_{12} deficiency in instances where B_{12} in serum or plasma is normal. (Strongly) elevated methylmalonic acid correlates with neuropathy and myelopathy, and it is a reliable biomarker during recovery or active (chronic) N_{2}O abuse.

== Measurement ==
Methylmalonic acid concentrations in blood are measured by gas chromatographic mass spectrometry or liquid chromatography–mass spectrometry (LC-MS) and the expected values of methylmalonic acid in healthy people are between 73 and 271 nmol/L.

== See also ==
- Malonic acid
