= Cobalt in biology =

In humans most cobalt is found in Vitamin B12. A cobalt atom is visible in the center in this diagram.

Cobalt is essential to the metabolism of all animals. It is a key constituent of cobalamin, also known as vitamin B_{12}, the primary biological reservoir of cobalt as an ultratrace element. Bacteria in the stomachs of ruminant animals convert cobalt salts into vitamin B_{12}, a compound which can only be produced by bacteria or archaea. A minimal presence of cobalt in soils therefore markedly improves the health of grazing animals, and an uptake of 0.20 mg/kg a day is recommended because they have no other source of vitamin B_{12}.

Proteins based on cobalamin use corrin to hold the cobalt. Coenzyme B_{12} features a reactive C-Co bond that participates in the reactions. In humans, B_{12} has two types of alkyl ligand: methyl and adenosyl. MeB_{12} promotes methyl (−CH_{3}) group transfers. The adenosyl version of B_{12} catalyzes rearrangements in which a hydrogen atom is directly transferred between two adjacent atoms with concomitant exchange of the second substituent, X, which may be a carbon atom with substituents, an oxygen atom of an alcohol, or an amine. Methylmalonyl coenzyme A mutase (MUT) converts MMl-CoA to Su-CoA, an important step in the extraction of energy from proteins and fats.

Although far less common than other metalloproteins (e.g. those of zinc and iron), other cobaltoproteins are known besides B_{12}. These proteins include methionine aminopeptidase 2, an enzyme that occurs in humans and other mammals that does not use the corrin ring of B_{12}, but binds cobalt directly. Another non-corrin cobalt enzyme is nitrile hydratase, an enzyme in bacteria that metabolizes nitriles.

== Cobalt deficiency ==
In humans, consumption of cobalt-containing vitamin B_{12} meets all needs for cobalt. For cattle and sheep, which meet vitamin B_{12} needs via synthesis by resident bacteria in the rumen, there is a function for inorganic cobalt. In the early 20th century, during the development of farming on the North Island Volcanic Plateau of New Zealand, cattle suffered from what was termed "bush sickness". It was discovered that the volcanic soils lacked the cobalt salts essential for the cattle food chain. The "coast disease" of sheep in the Ninety Mile Desert of the Southeast of South Australia in the 1930s was found to originate in nutritional deficiencies of trace elements cobalt and copper. The cobalt deficiency was overcome by the development of "cobalt bullets", dense pellets of cobalt oxide mixed with clay given orally for lodging in the animal's rumen.

Cobalamin

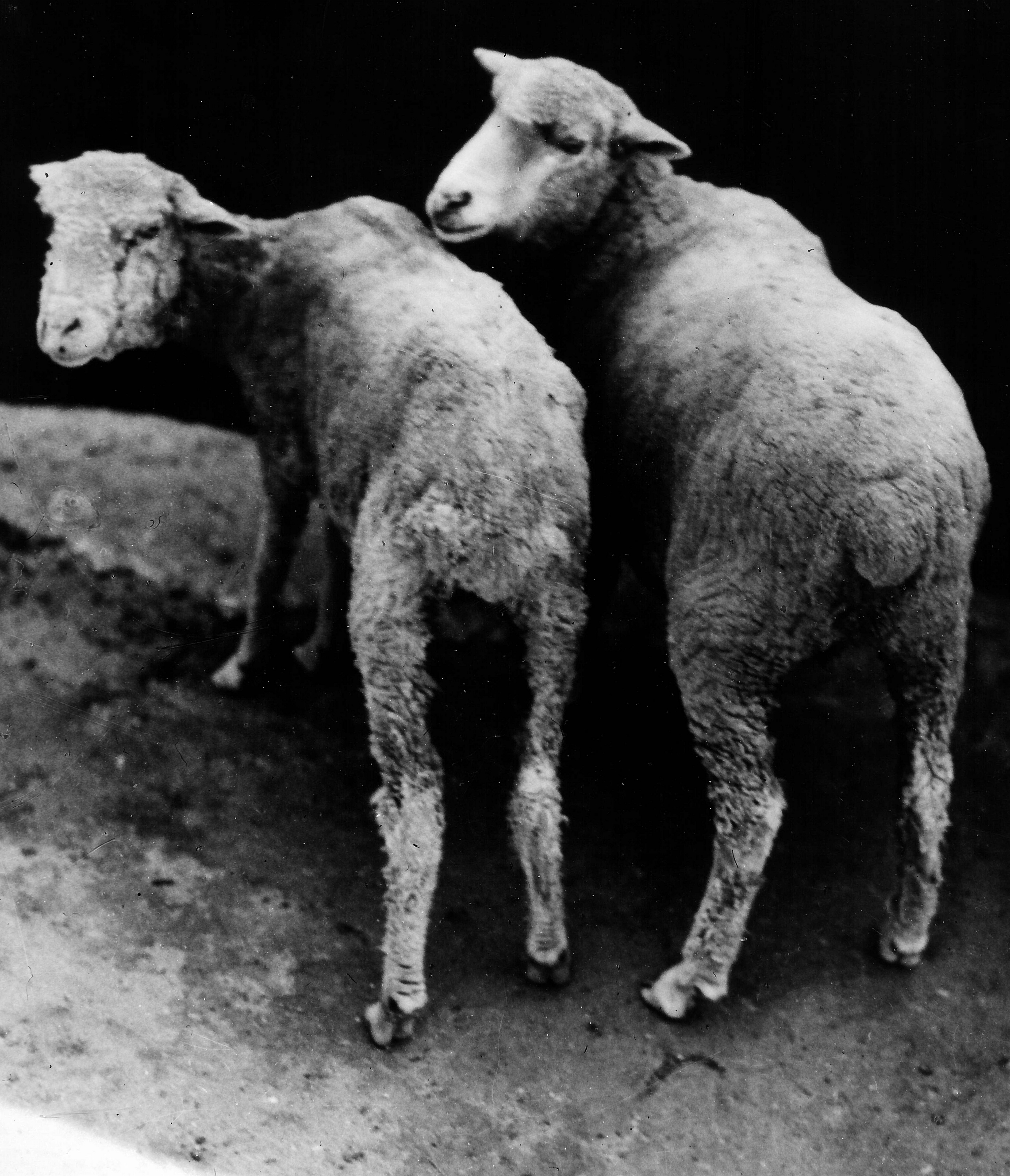
Cobalt-deficient sheep
