= (S)-methylmalonyl-CoA hydrolase =

Class of enzymes

Identifiers
- EC no.: 3.1.2.17
- CAS no.: 87928-03-8

Databases
- BRENDA: enzyme data
- ExPASy: NiceZyme view
- KEGG: enzyme entry
- MetaCyc: metabolic pathway
- Rhea: reactions
- PDB structures: RCSB PDB PDBe PDBsum
- Gene Ontology: AmiGO / QuickGO
Search
- PMC: articles
- PubMed: articles
- NCBI: proteins

The enzyme (S)-methylmalonyl-CoA hydrolase (EC 3.1.2.17) catalyzes the reaction

(S)-methylmalonyl-CoA
H_{2}O
coenzyme A
+
methylmalonic acid

The enzyme characterised from liver hydrolyses (S)-methylmalonyl-CoA to coenzyme A and methylmalonic acid, which forms the thioester in the starting material. The starting material is produced from propionyl-CoA, a breakdown product of some amino acids, and an increase of methylmalonic acid is a marker of vitamin B_{12} deficiency as methylmalonyl-CoA is converted to succinyl-CoA by an enzyme using the vitamin as a cofactor.

This enzyme is a hydrolase, specifically one acting on thioester bonds. The systematic name of this enzyme class is (S)-methylmalonyl-CoA hydrolase. This enzyme is also called D-methylmalonyl-coenzyme A hydrolase.
