= Methylmalonyl CoA epimerase =

Class of enzymes

MCEE

Identifiers
- Aliases: MCEE, GLOD2, methylmalonyl-CoA epimerase, MCE, MMCE
- External IDs: OMIM: 608419; MGI: 1920974; GeneCards: MCEE
Available structures
PDB	Ortholog search: PDBe RCSB
PDB	List of PDB id codes 3RMU
Enzyme activity
EC #	BRENDA	ExPASy	KEGG	MetaCyc
5.1.99.1	↗	↗	↗	↗

Gene location (Human)
Chr.	Chromosome 2 (human)
Band	2p13.3	Start	71,109,684 bp
Band	2p13.3	End	71,130,239 bp

Gene location (Mouse)
Chr.	Chromosome 7 (mouse)
Band	7|7 C	Start	64,042,355 bp
Band	7|7 C	End	64,061,873 bp
RNA expression pattern
Bgee	Human / Mouse (ortholog); Top expressed in: body of pancreas; right lobe of liver; myocardium of left ventricle; skin of arm; right auricle of heart; right adrenal gland; left adrenal gland; Achilles tendon; minor salivary glands; left adrenal cortex / Top expressed in: right kidney; intercostal muscle; interventricular septum; right ventricle; digastric muscle; brown adipose tissue; sternocleidomastoid muscle; soleus muscle; myocardium of ventricle; muscle of thigh; More reference expression data
BioGPS	n/a
Gene ontology
Molecular function	protein binding; isomerase activity; metal ion binding; methylmalonyl-CoA epimerase activity
Cellular component	mitochondrial matrix; mitochondrion
Biological process	short-chain fatty acid catabolic process; L-methylmalonyl-CoA metabolic process
Sources:Amigo / QuickGO
Orthologs
Databases	NCBI: entry; OMA: entry
Species	Human	Mouse
Entrez	84693	73724
Ensembl	ENSG00000124370	ENSMUSG00000033429
UniProt	Q96PE7	Q9D1I5
RefSeq (mRNA)	NM_032601	NM_028626; NM_001355124
RefSeq (protein)	NP_115990	NP_082902; NP_001342053
Location (UCSC)	Chr 2: 71.11 – 71.13 Mb	Chr 7: 64.04 – 64.06 Mb
PubMed search
- Wikidata
View/Edit Human	View/Edit Mouse

methylmalonyl CoA epimerase
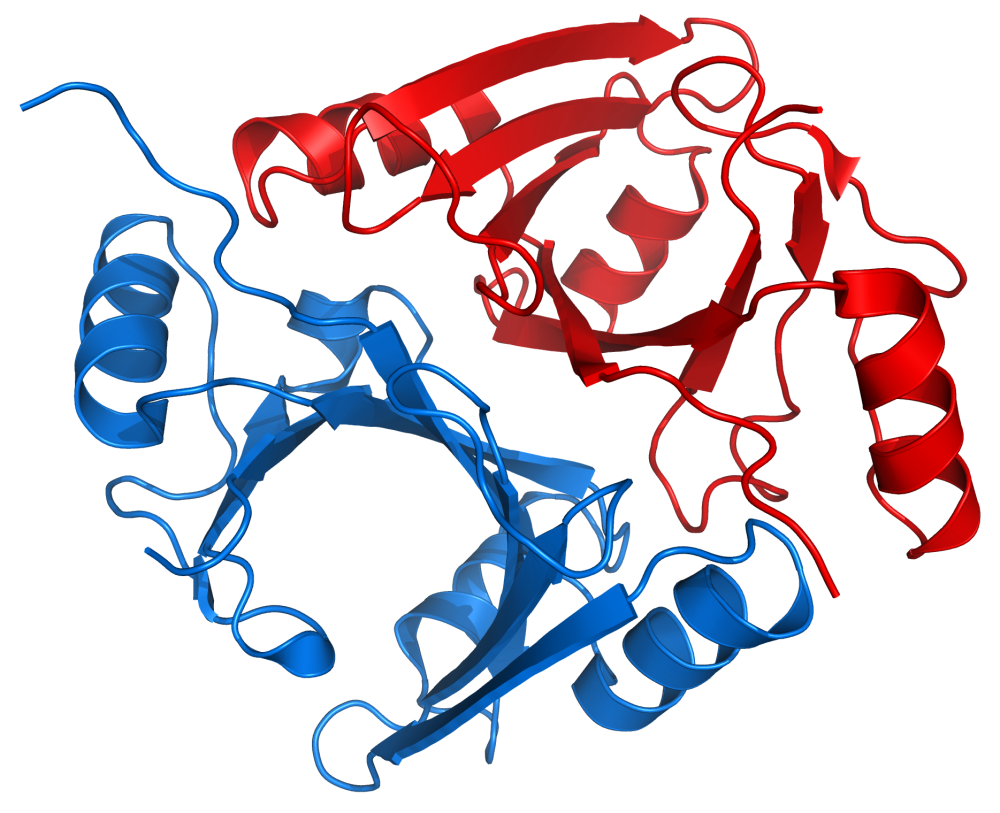
- Ribbon diagram of methylmalonyl-CoA epimerase from Propionibacterium shermanii. From PDB: 1JC5.

Identifiers
- EC no.: 5.1.99.1

Databases
- BRENDA: enzyme data
- ExPASy: NiceZyme view
- KEGG: enzyme entry
- MetaCyc: metabolic pathway
- Rhea: reactions
- PDB structures: RCSB PDB PDBe PDBsum
- Gene Ontology: AmiGO / QuickGO
Search
- PMC: articles
- PubMed: articles
- NCBI: proteins

Methylmalonyl CoA epimerase (EC 5.1.99.1) is an enzyme which in humans is encoded by the MCEE gene. It is involved in the process of breaking down fatty acids (fatty acid catabolism). It is also frequently called methylmalonyl-CoA racemase, but this is technically inaccurate. It is not a racemase because the CoA moiety has 5 other stereocenters. Outside of humans, the term "Methylmalonyl-CoA epimerase" is sometimes used more broadly to refer to any enzyme that can catalyze the same reaction, such as the multifunctional enzyme called "Ethylmalonyl-CoA/methylmalonyl-CoA epimerase", which was found in a type of bacteria.

== Structure ==
The "MCEE" gene is located in the 2p13 region and contains 4 exons, and encodes for a protein that is approximately 18 kDa in size and located to the mitochondrial matrix. Several natural variants in amino acid sequences exist. The structure of the MCEE protein has been resolved by X-ray crystallography at 1.8-angstrom resolution.

== Function ==
The MCEE gene encodes an enzyme that interconverts D- and L- methylmalonyl-CoA during the degradation of branched-chain amino acids, odd chain-length fatty acids, and other metabolites. In biochemistry terms, it catalyses the chemical reaction that converts (S)-methylmalonyl-CoA to the (R) form:

(S)-methylmalonyl-CoA $\rightleftharpoons$ (R)-methylmalonyl-CoA

Methylmalonyl CoA epimerase plays an important role in the catabolism of fatty acids with odd-length carbon chains. In the catabolism of even-chain saturated fatty acids, the β-oxidation pathway breaks down fatty acyl-CoA molecules in repeated sequences of four reactions to yield one acetyl CoA per repeated sequence. This means that, for each round of β-oxidation, the fatty acyl-Co-A is shortened by two carbons. If the fatty acid began with an even number of carbons, this process could break down an entire saturated fatty acid into acetyl-CoA units. If the fatty acid began with an odd number of carbons, however, β-oxidation would break the fatty acyl-CoA down until the three carbon propionyl-CoA is formed. In order to convert this to the metabolically useful succinyl-CoA, three reactions are needed. The propionyl-CoA is first carboxylated to (S)-methylmalonyl-CoA by the enzyme Propionyl-CoA carboxylase. Methylmalonyl CoA epimerase then catalyzes the rearrangement of (S)-methylmalonyl-CoA to the (R) form in a reaction that uses a vitamin B12 cofactor and a resonance-stabilized carbanion intermediate. The (R)-methylmalonyl-CoA is then converted to succinyl-CoA in a reaction catalyzed by methylmalonyl-CoA mutase.

Acting as a general base, the enzyme abstracts a proton from the β-carbon of (R)-methylmalonyl-CoA. This results in the formation of a carbanion intermediate in which the α-carbon is stabilized by resonance. The enzyme then acts as a general acid to protonate the β-carbon, resulting in the formation of (S)-methylmalonyl-CoA.

== Clinical significance ==
Mutations in the MCEE gene causes methymalonyl-CoA epimerase deficiency (MCEED), a rare autosomal recessive inborn error of metabolism in amino acid metabolisms involving branched-chain amino acids valine, leucine, and isoleucine. Patients with MCEED may present with life-threatening neonatal metabolic acidosis, hyperammonemia, feeding difficulties, and coma.
