= C25H40N7O19P3S =

The molecular formula C_{25}H_{40}N_{7}O_{19}P_{3}S (molar mass: 867.607 g/mol) may refer to:

- Methylmalonyl-CoA
- Succinyl-CoA
