= Succinyl-CoA:(R)-benzylsuccinate CoA-transferase =

Class of enzymes

Identifiers
- EC no.: 2.8.3.15

Databases
- IntEnz: IntEnz view
- BRENDA: BRENDA entry
- ExPASy: NiceZyme view
- KEGG: KEGG entry
- MetaCyc: metabolic pathway
- PRIAM: profile
- PDB structures: RCSB PDB PDBe PDBsum
Search
- PMC: articles
- PubMed: articles
- NCBI: proteins

In enzymology, a succinyl-CoA:(R)-benzylsuccinate CoA-transferase (EC 2.8.3.15) is an enzyme that catalyzes the chemical reaction

succinyl-CoA + (R)-2-benzylsuccinate $\rightleftharpoons$ succinate + (R)-2-benzylsuccinyl-CoA

Thus, the two substrates of this enzyme are succinyl-CoA and (R)-2-benzylsuccinate, whereas its two products are succinate and (R)-2-benzylsuccinyl-CoA.

This enzyme belongs to the family of transferases, specifically the CoA-transferases. The systematic name of this enzyme class is succinyl-CoA:(R)-2-benzylsuccinate CoA-transferase. This enzyme is also called benzylsuccinate CoA-transferase. This enzyme participates in benzoate degradation via coa ligation.
