= 3-oxoadipate CoA-transferase =

Class of enzymes

Identifiers
- EC no.: 2.8.3.6
- CAS no.: 9026-16-8

Databases
- BRENDA: enzyme data
- ExPASy: NiceZyme view
- KEGG: enzyme entry
- MetaCyc: metabolic pathway
- Rhea: reactions
- PDB structures: RCSB PDB PDBe PDBsum
- Gene Ontology: AmiGO / QuickGO
Search
- PMC: articles
- PubMed: articles
- NCBI: proteins

3-oxoadipate CoA-transferase (EC 2.8.3.6) is an enzyme that catalyzes the chemical reaction

β-ketoadipic acid
+
succinyl-CoA
3-oxoadipyl-CoA
+
succinic acid

The two substrates of this enzyme characterised from Pseudomonas fluorescens are β-ketoadipic acid and succinyl-CoA. Its products are 3-oxoadipyl-CoA and succinic acid. This reaction is part of the degradation of several aromatic compounds which proceed via β-ketoadipic acid.

This enzyme is a transferases, specifically a CoA-transferases. The systematic name of this enzyme class is succinyl-CoA:3-oxoadipate CoA-transferase. Other names in common use include 3-oxoadipate coenzyme A-transferase, and 3-oxoadipate succinyl-CoA transferase.
