= Methylmalonic acidemias =

- Other names: Methylmalonic acidurias, MMAs
- Methylmalonic acid
- Specialty: Endocrinology

Methylmalonic acidemias, also called methylmalonic acidurias, (Note: The names methylmalonic acidemia and methylmalonic aciduria, which are also sometimes written as solid compounds (methylmalonicacidemia and methylmalonicaciduria), use the suffixes -emia and -uria and literally mean "[excess] methylmalonic acid in the blood" and "[excess] methylmalonic acid in the urine", respectively; they are used to label both the fluid analysis findings and the disease entity that causes them.) are a group of inherited metabolic disorders, that prevent the body from properly breaking down proteins and fats. This leads to a buildup of a toxic level of methylmalonic acid in body liquids and tissues. Due to the disturbed branched-chain amino acids (BCAA) metabolism, they are among the classical organic acidemias.

Methylmalonic acidemias have varying diagnoses, treatment requirements, and prognoses, which are determined by the specific genetic mutation causing the inherited form of the disorder.

The first symptoms may begin as early as the first day of life or as late as adulthood. Symptoms can range from mild to life-threatening. Some forms can result in death if undiagnosed or left untreated.

Methylmalonic acidemias are found with an equal frequency across ethnic boundaries.

== Signs and symptoms ==
Depending on the affected gene(s) and mutation, the present symptoms can range from mild to life-threatening.

- Acidosis
- Cardiomyopathy
- Coma
- Dehydration
- Developmental delays
- Dysmorphic features
- Encephalopathy, progressive
- Failure to thrive
- Gastrointestinal disease
- Hepatomegaly
- Hyperammonemia
- Hyperglycinemia/ Hyperglycinuria
- Hypoglycemia
- Hypotonia
- Infections, recurrent
- Ketonemia/ Ketonuria
- Kidney failure
- Lethargy
- Low concentrations of red blood cells, white blood cells and blood platelets
- Memory problems
- Pancreatitis
- Respiratory distress
- Speech delay
- Seizure
- Stroke
- Vomiting

As a rule, methylmalonic acidemias are not apparent at birth as symptoms do not present themselves until proteins are added to the infant's diet. Because of this, symptoms typically manifest anytime within the first year of life. However, there are also forms that only develop symptoms in adulthood.

== Cause ==
=== Genetic ===
Methylmalonic acidemia has an autosomal recessive pattern of inheritance.

Methylmalonic acidemias have an autosomal recessive inheritance pattern, which means the defective gene is located on an autosome, and two copies of the gene—one from each parent—must be inherited to be affected by the disorder. The parents of a child with an autosomal recessive disorder are carriers of one copy of the defective gene, but are usually not affected by the disorder. The exception is methylmalonic acidemia and homocystinuria, cblX type due to variants in HCFC1 gene, which is inherited in an X-linked recessive manner.

The following are the known genotypes responsible for isolated methylmalonic acidemias:

Isolated methylmalonic acidemias
Gene	Type	OMIM	Name	Prevalence	Age of onset
MCEE		251120	Methylmalonic acidemia due to methylmalonyl-CoA epimerase deficiency	<1:1,000,000	Childhood, Infancy
MMAA	cblA	251100	Methylmalonic acidemia, vitamin B12-responsive, cblA type	<1:1,000,000	Childhood
MMAB	cblB	251110	Methylmalonic acidemia, vitamin B12-responsive, cblB type		Childhood
MMADHC	cblDv2	277410	Methylmalonic acidemia, cblD type, variant 2		
MMUT	mut0	251000	Methylmalonic acidemia, vitamin B12-unresponsive, mut0 type		Infancy, Neonatal
MMUT	mut-	251000	Methylmalonic acidemia, vitamin B12-unresponsive, mut- type		Infancy, Neonatal

The mut type can further be divided into mut0 and mut- subtypes, with mut0 characterized by a complete lack of methylmalonyl-CoA mutase and more severe symptoms and mut- characterized by a decreased amount of mutase activity.

Furthermore, the following genes are also responsible for methylmalonic acidemias:

Further methylmalonic acidemias
Gene	Type	OMIM	Name	Prevalence	Age of onset
ABCD4	cblJ	614857	Methylmalonic acidemia and homocystinuria, cblJ type	<1:1,000,000	Infancy, Neonatal
ACSF3		614265	Combined malonic and methylmalonic aciduria (CMAMMA)	1:30,000	All ages
ALDH6A1		614105	Methylmalonate semialdehyde dehydrogenase deficiency	<1:1,000,000	Infancy, Neonatal
AMN		618882	Imerslund-Grasbeck syndrome 2		Childhood
CBLIF		261000	Intrinsic factor deficiency	<1:1,000,000	Childhood
CD320	TcblR	613646	Methylmalonic acidemia due to transcobalamin receptor defect	<1:1,000,000	Infancy, Neonatal
CUBN		261100	Imerslund-Grasbeck syndrome 1		Childhood
HCFC1	cblX	309541	Methylmalonic acidemia and homocystinuria, cblX type	<1:1,000,000	Infancy, Neonatal
LMBRD1	cblF	277380	Methylmalonic acidemia and homocystinuria, cblF type	<1:1,000,000	Childhood
MLYCD		248360	Malonic aciduria	<1:1,000,000	Childhood
MMACHC, PRDX1	cblC	277400	Methylmalonic acidemia and homocystinuria, cblC type	1:200,000	All ages
MMADHC	cblD	277410	Methylmalonic acidemia and homocystinuria, cblD type	<1:1,000,000	All ages
SUCLA2		612073	SUCLA2-related mtDNA depletion syndrome, encephalomyopathic form with methylmalonic aciduria	<1:1,000,000	Infancy
SUCLG1		245400	SUCLG1-related mtDNA depletion syndrome, encephalomyopathic form with methylmalonic aciduria		Infancy, Neonatal
TCN2		275350	Transcobalamin-II deficiency	<1:1,000,000	Infancy, Neonatal
ZBTB11		618383	Autosomal recessive intellectual developmental disorder 69		

=== Nutritional ===
Though not always grouped together with the inherited versions, a severe nutritional vitamin B_{12} deficiency can also result in syndrome with identical symptoms and treatments as the genetic methylmalonic acidemias. Methylmalonyl-CoA requires vitamin B_{12} to form succinyl-CoA. When the amount of B_{12} is insufficient for the conversion of cofactor methylmalonyl-CoA into succinyl-CoA, the buildup of unused methylmalonyl-CoA eventually leads to methylmalonic acidemia. This diagnosis is often used as an indicator of vitamin B_{12} deficiency in serum.

== Pathophysiology ==
Propionate metabolism and mitochondrial fatty acid synthesis pathways with selected types of methylmalonic acidemias highlighted at the affected enzymes or at the cofactor adenosylcobalamin.

In methylmalonic acidemias, the body is unable to break down properly:

- essential amino acids: methionine, valine, threonine and isoleucine
- propionic acid from intestinal fermentation
- odd-chain fatty acids
- cholesterol side chain

As a result, methylmalonic acid builds up in liquids and tissues. Those afflicted with this disorder are either lacking functional copies or adequate levels of one or more of the following enzymes:

- methylmalonyl-CoA mutase (MUT)
- acyl-CoA synthetase family member 3 (ACSF3)
- methylmalonyl-CoA epimerase (MCEE)
- enzymes involved in adenosylcobalamin synthesis

These are briefly introduced below:

=== Methylmalonyl-CoA mutase ===
It is estimated that as many as 60% of isolated methylmalonic acidemia cases are the result of a mutated MMUT gene, which encodes the protein methylmalonyl-CoA mutase. This enzyme is responsible for the digestion of potentially toxic derivatives of the breakdown of the above-mentioned amino acids and fats, primarily cholesterol, particularly this enzyme converts methylmalonyl-CoA into succinyl-CoA. Without this enzyme, the body has no means to neutralize or remove methylmalonic acid and related compounds. The action of this enzyme can also be crippled by mutations in the MMAA, MMAB, and MMADHC genes, each of which encodes a protein required for normal functioning of methylmalonyl-CoA mutase.

=== Acyl-CoA synthetase family member 3 ===
CMAMMA is probably the most common form of methylmalonic acidemias based on its allele frequency, but is rarely diagnosed due to slippage through routine newborn screening, wide symptom variety, and, in some cases, symptoms only appearing in adulthood. Pathogenic mutations of the ACSF3 gene lead to a defect of the mitochondrial enzyme acyl-CoA synthetase family member 3 (ACSF3), resulting in accumulation of methylmalonic acid and malonic acid. The enzyme's dual role is the conversion of methylmalonic acid into methylmalonyl-CoA and of malonic acid into malonyl-CoA, the latter being required for mitochondrial fatty acid synthesis (mtFAS) and mitochondrial protein malonylation. CMAMMA can therefore be defined not only as an organic acidemia but also as a defect of mitochondrial fatty acid synthesis and of protein malonylation.

=== Methylmalonyl-CoA epimerase ===
Mutations in the MCEE gene, which encodes the methylmalonyl-CoA epimerase protein, also referred to as methylmalonyl racemase, will cause a much milder form of the disorder than the related methylmalonyl-CoA mutase variant. Like the mutase, the epimerase also functions in breaking down the same substances, but to a significantly lesser extent than the mutase does. The phenotypic differences caused by a deficiency of the epimerase as opposed to the mutase are so mild that there is debate within the medical community as to whether or not this genetic deficiency can be considered a disorder or clinical syndrome.

=== Adenosylcobalamin ===
Also known as vitamin B_{12,} this form of cobalamin is a required cofactor of methylmalonyl-CoA mutase. Even with a functional version of the enzyme at physiologically normal levels, if B_{12} cannot be converted to this active form (due to defects in the Adenosylcobalamin synthesis system or cobalamin transporters), the mutase will be unable to function.

== Diagnosis ==
=== Newborn Screening ===
Due to the severity and rapidity with which this disorder can cause complications when left undiagnosed, screening for methylmalonic acidemias is often included in the newborn screening exam. For this purpose, a dried blood spot test for the parameter propionylcarnitine (C3) is carried out at the age of 24–48 hours in order to detect isolated methylmalonic acidemias.

Due to normal propionylcarnitine levels and asymptomatic symptoms at the time of testing, the probably most common form of methylmalonic acidemias, CMAMMA, slips through the newborn screening. The autosomal recessive intellectual development disorder 69 also has normal propionylcarnitine levels. Methylmalonic acidemia and homocystinuria, cblC type, if mild and with late onset, can also slip through.

=== Routine & biochemical labs ===
Typically, the parameter methylmalonic acid is only tested if propionylcarnitine was previously elevated.

Because of the inability to properly break down amino acids completely, the byproduct of protein digestion, the compound methylmalonic acid, is found in a disproportionate concentration in the blood and urine of those afflicted. These abnormal levels are the main diagnostic criterion for diagnosing the disorder. This disorder is typically determined through the use of a urine analysis or blood panel. Elevated levels of ammonia, glycine, and ketone bodies may also be present in the blood and urine.

With the inclusion of the parameter malonic acid, CMAMMA can be quickly differentiated from classic methylmalonic acidemia by calculating the ratio of malonic acid to methylmalonic acid, but only with values from the blood plasma and not from the urine. The ratio can then also be used to determine whether it is CMAMMA (MA<MMA) or malonic aciduria (MA>MMA).

=== Vitamin B_{12} responsiveness test ===
The test is used for further differential diagnosis and to check the effectiveness of treatment with vitamin B_{12}, the latter can prevent unnecessary injections (of vitamin B_{12}) in children. For better comparability and interpretation of patient reports, Fowler et al. have developed a protocol for a standardized vitamin B_{12} responsiveness test (in vivo):

1. Metabolically stable and on the same treatment for at least a month. Specify energy and protein intake.
2. Stop vitamin B_{12} at least one month before. If worsening, discontinue and resume administration of vitamin B_{12}.
3. For baseline, collect urine from 3 different days. Blood plasma concentrations can also be used if the test is sensitive enough.
4. Intramuscular injection of 1 mg hydroxocobalamin on 3 consecutive days.
5. After injection, collect urine or plasma samples on alternate days for 10 days.
6. The urine or plasma samples should be analyzed in the same run by GC-MS.
7. If the mean urine or plasma concentration of methylmalonic acid decreases by more than 50%, it is vitamin B_{12} responsive.

Furthermore, vitamin B_{12} responsiveness can also be tested in vitro. It can provide some insights, but it cannot always correctly predict in vivo vitamin B_{12} responsiveness.

=== Molecular genetic testing ===
The final diagnosis is confirmed by molecular genetic testing if biallelic pathogenic variants are found in the affected gene(s). Due to their high sensitivity, accessibility, and non-invasiveness, molecular genetic tests have replaced enzyme assays in most cases. There are specific multigene panels for methylmalonic acidemias, but the particular genes tested may vary from laboratory to laboratory and can be customized by the clinician to the individual phenotype. The molecular genetic methods used in these panels range from sequence analysis, deletion/duplication analysis and other non-sequencing based tests, but in the vast majority of cases the diagnosis is made by sequence analysis.

Furthermore, molecular genetic tests are necessary to check suspected diagnoses and correct misdiagnoses that may have been caused by misleading symptoms and results of the vitamin B_{12} responsiveness test.

=== Other ===
The presence of methylmalonic acidemia can also be suspected through the use of a CT or MRI scan, however, these tests are by no means specific and require clinical and metabolic/correlation.

Differential diagnosis path
Methylmalonic acid levels	Homocysteine levels	Differential diagnosis	Next diagnostics	Vitamin B_{12} response (in vivo)		Differential diagnosis	Next diagnostics
Methylmalonic acid levels	Homocysteine levels	Differential diagnosis	Next diagnostics	Methylmalonic acid levels	Homocysteine levels	Differential diagnosis	Next diagnostics
Very high	Normal	mut0, mut-, cblA, cbIB, cblDv2	Vitamin B_{12} response (in vivo)	Unresponsive		mut0, mut-, cbIB	Molecular genetic testing, enzyme assay, ^{14}C propionate incorporation, cobalamin complementation studies
Very high	Normal	mut0, mut-, cblA, cbIB, cblDv2	Vitamin B_{12} response (in vivo)	Responsive (reduction of >50% or normal levels)		cbIA, cbIB, cbIDv2, mut-?	Molecular genetic testing, enzyme assay, ^{14}C propionate incorporation, cobalamin complementation studies
High	Normal	MCEE, TcbIR, SUCLG1/A2, CMAMMA, MMSDH and other	Vitamin B_{12} response (in vivo), enzyme assay, molecular genetic testing	Unresponsive		MCEE, CMAMMA, and other	Molecular genetic testing, enzyme assay, ^{14}C propionate incorporation, cobalamin complementation studies
High	Normal	MCEE, TcbIR, SUCLG1/A2, CMAMMA, MMSDH and other	Vitamin B_{12} response (in vivo), enzyme assay, molecular genetic testing	Responsive (reduction of >50% or normal levels)		TcblR	Molecular genetic testing, enzyme assay, ^{14}C propionate incorporation, cobalamin complementation studies
High	High	cblC, cbID, cblF, cblJ, cbIX, TC-II, TcbIR, B_{12} deficiency syndromes	Vitamin B_{12} response (in vivo)	High or normal	High or normal	cblC, cbID, cblF, cblJ	Molecular genetic testing, enzyme assay, ^{14}C propionate incorporation, cobalamin complementation studies
High	High	cblC, cbID, cblF, cblJ, cbIX, TC-II, TcbIR, B_{12} deficiency syndromes	Vitamin B_{12} response (in vivo)	Normal	Normal	TC-II, TcbIR, B_{12} deficiency syndromes	Molecular genetic testing, enzyme assay, ^{14}C propionate incorporation, cobalamin complementation studies
High	High	False positive, maternal B_{12} deficiency					

== Treatment ==
=== Dietary ===
Treatment for all forms of this condition primarily relies on a low-protein diet, and depending on what variant of the disorder the individual suffers from, various dietary supplements. All variants respond to the levo isomer of carnitine as the improper breakdown of the affected substances results in sufferers developing a carnitine deficiency. The carnitine also assists in the removal of acyl-CoA, a buildup of which is common in low-protein diets, by converting it into acyl-carnitine, which can be excreted in urine. Some forms of methylmalonyl acidemia are responsive to cobalamin, although cyanocobalamin supplements could prove detrimental to some forms. If the individual proves responsive to both cobalamin and carnitine supplements, then it may be possible for them to ingest substances that include small amounts of the problematic amino acids isoleucine, threonine, methionine, and valine without causing an attack. CblA und cblB versions of methylmalonic acidemia are cobalamin-responsive.

=== Surgical ===
A more extreme treatment includes a kidney or liver transplant from a donor without the condition. The foreign organs will produce a functional version of the defective enzymes and digest the methylmalonic acid, however all of the disadvantages of organ transplantation are of course applicable in this situation. There is evidence to suggest that the central nervous system may metabolize methylmalonyl-CoA in a system isolated from the rest of the body. If this is the case, transplantation may not reverse the neurological effects of methylmalonic acid before the transplant or prevent further damage to the brain by continued buildup.

=== mRNA therapeutics ===
Preclinical proof-of-concept studies in animal models have shown that mRNA therapy is also suitable for rare metabolic diseases, including isolated methylmalonic acidemia. In this context, the mut methylmalonic acidemia therapy candidate mRNA-3705 from the biotechnology company Moderna, which is currently in phase 1/2, is worth mentioning.

=== Small molecular therapeutics ===
The investigational small molecular therapeutic HST5040 from HemoShear Therapeutics for methylmalonic aciduria and propionic aciduria, which is currently in phase 2, should be mentioned here. Taken daily orally or by gastric tube, it is designed to prevent toxic accumulation of propionyl-CoA and methylmalonyl-CoA or their derivatives by shunting CoA away from the propionyl-CoA pathway, leading to normal or near-normal levels of these metabolites and potentially improving metabolic state and energy-producing pathways.

Another small molecule therapeutic in development is BBP-671 from BridgeBio Pharma for pantothenate kinase-associated neurodegeneration (PKAN), propionic and methylmalonic acidemias, which is currently in phase 1. By allosterically activating pantothenate kinases, BBP-671 is expected to increase the production of CoA from vitamin B_{5} and thus normalize metabolic processes.

== Prognosis ==
Though there are no distinct stages of the disease, methylmalonic acidemia is a progressive condition; the symptoms of this disorder are compounded as the concentration of methylmalonic acid increases. If the triggering proteins and fats are not removed from the diet, this buildup can lead to irreparable kidney or liver damage and eventually death.

The prognosis will vary depending on the severity of the condition and the individual's response to treatment. Prognosis is typically better for those with cobalamin-responsive variants and not promising in those suffering from non-cobalamin-responsive variants. Milder variants have a higher frequency of appearance in the population than the more severe ones. Even with dietary modification and continued medical care, it may not be possible to prevent neurological damage in those with a nonresponsive acidemia. Without proper treatment or diagnosis, it is not uncommon for the first acidemic attack to be fatal.

Despite these challenges, since it was first identified in 1967, treatment and understanding of the condition has improved to the point where it is not unheard of for even those with unresponsive forms of methylmalonic acidemia to be able to reach adulthood and even carry and deliver children safely.

== Research ==
=== Nosologic history ===
The first methylmalonic acidemia was characterized by Oberholzer et al. in 1967.

=== Neurologic effects ===
That methylmalonic acid can have disastrous effects on the nervous system has long been reported; however, the mechanism by which this occurs has never been determined. Published in 2015, research performed on the effects of methylmalonic acid on neurons isolated from fetal rats in an in vitro setting using a control group of neurons treated with an alternate acid of similar pH. These tests have suggested that methylmalonic acid causes decreases in cellular size and an increase in the rate of cellular apoptosis in a concentration-dependent manner, with more extreme effects being seen at higher concentrations. Furthermore, micro-array analysis of these treated neurons have also suggested that on an epigenetic-level methylmalonic acid alters the transcription rate of 564 genes, notably including those involved in the apoptosis, p53, and MAPK signaling pathways.

=== Mitochondrial dysfunction ===
As the conversion of methylmalonyl-CoA to succinyl-CoA takes place inside the mitochondria, mitochondrial dysfunction as a result of diminished electron transport chain function has long been suspected as a feature in methylmalonic acidemias. Recent research has found that in rat models, mitochondria of rats affected by the disorder grow to an unusual size, dubbed megamitochondria. These megamitochondria also appear to have deformed internal structures and a loss of electron richness in their matrix. These megamitochondria also showed signs of decreased respiratory chain function, particularly in respiratory complex IV, which only functioned at about 50% efficiency. Similar changes were identified in the mitochondria of a liver sample removed during transplant from a 5-year-old boy suffering from methylmalonic acidemia mut type. In contrast, fibroblasts from CMAMMA patients show numerous small, fragmented mitochondria with rounded, punctate structures, caused by dysregulated fission in the context of elevated mitochondrial β-oxidation and reactive oxygen species (ROS) production.

=== Benign mut phenotype ===
Case studies in several patients presenting nonresponsive mut0 methylmalonic acidemia with a specific mutation designated p.P86L have suggested the possibility of further subdivision in mut type methylmalonic acidemia might exist. Though currently unclear if this is due to the specific mutation or early detection and treatment, despite complete nonresponse to cobalamin supplements, these individuals appeared to develop a largely benign and nearly completely asymptomatic version of methylmalonic acidemia. Despite consistently showing elevated methylmalonic acid in the blood and urine, these individuals appeared, for the most part, developmentally normal.

== Notable cases ==
- Ryan Stallings, a St. Louis infant, was mistakenly diagnosed with ethylene glycol poisoning instead of methylmalonic acidemia in 1989, leading to a wrongful murder conviction and life sentence for his mother, Patricia Stallings.

== See also ==
- Isovaleric acidemia
- Propionic acidemia
- Maple syrup urine disease
