= MMAA (disambiguation) =

MMAA is an acronym for Methylmalonic aciduria type A protein, mitochondrial. It can also refer to:

- Minnesota Museum of American Art
- Minnesota Martial Arts Academy
- MMAA ICAO code for Acapulco International Airport
