= MMAB (disambiguation) =

MMAB is Cob(I)yrinic acid a,c-diamide adenosyltransferase, mitochondrial.

MMAB may also refer to:

- Marine Modeling and Analysis Branch, is part of the Environmental Modeling Center
- Mohammad Mohsin Alam Bhat, assistant professor at O. P. Jindal Global University
