= Succinate—citramalate CoA-transferase =

Enzyme family

succinate-citramalate CoA-transferase

Identifiers
- EC no.: 2.8.3.7
- CAS no.: 9033-60-7

Databases
- IntEnz: IntEnz view
- BRENDA: BRENDA entry
- ExPASy: NiceZyme view
- KEGG: KEGG entry
- MetaCyc: metabolic pathway
- PRIAM: profile
- PDB structures: RCSB PDB PDBe PDBsum
- Gene Ontology: AmiGO / QuickGO
Search
- PMC: articles
- PubMed: articles
- NCBI: proteins

In enzymology, a succinate-citramalate CoA-transferase (EC 2.8.3.7) is an enzyme that catalyzes the chemical reaction

succinyl-CoA + citramalate $\rightleftharpoons$ succinate + citramalyl-CoA

Thus, the two substrates of this enzyme are succinyl-CoA and citramalate, whereas its two products are succinate and citramalyl-CoA.

This enzyme belongs to the family of transferases, specifically the CoA-transferases. The systematic name of this enzyme class is succinyl-CoA:citramalate CoA-transferase. Other names in common use include itaconate CoA-transferase, citramalate CoA-transferase, citramalate coenzyme A-transferase, and succinyl coenzyme A-citramalyl coenzyme A transferase. This enzyme participates in c5-branched dibasic acid metabolism.
