= Propionyl-CoA carboxylase =

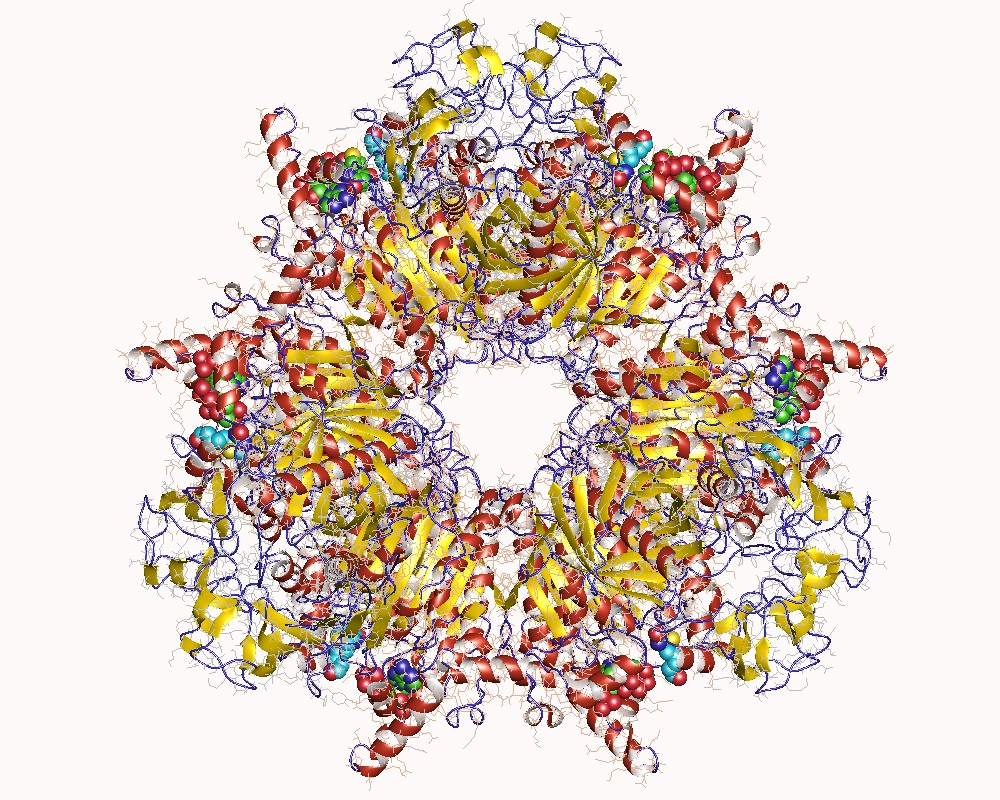
- Propionyl-CoA carboxylase hetero12mer, Methylorubrum extorquens

Identifiers
- EC no.: 6.4.1.3
- CAS no.: 9023-94-3

Databases
- BRENDA: enzyme data
- ExPASy: NiceZyme view
- KEGG: enzyme entry
- MetaCyc: metabolic pathway
- Rhea: reactions
- PDB structures: RCSB PDB PDBe PDBsum
- Gene Ontology: AmiGO / QuickGO
Search
- PMC: articles
- PubMed: articles
- NCBI: proteins

A propionyl-CoA carboxylase (EC 6.4.1.3, PCC) is a type of enzyme that in humans is composed of protein subunits which are encoded by the genes PCCA and PCCB. Notably, it is part of the process of breaking down odd-chain fatty acids and certain amino acids. As an enzyme, it is a biotin-dependent ligase that catalyses the carboxylation reaction of propionyl-CoA in the mitochondrial matrix, producing (S)-methylmalonyl CoA:

ATP + propionyl-CoA + HCO_{3}^{−} $\rightleftharpoons$ ADP + phosphate + (S)-methylmalonyl-CoA

(S)-Methylmalonyl-CoA cannot be directly utilized by animals. Instead, it is first acted upon by the enzyme, methylmalonyl-CoA epimerase, yielding (R)-methylmalonyl-CoA, which is then converted into succinyl-CoA by methylmalonyl-CoA mutase. Succinyl-CoA, a Krebs cycle intermediate, is further metabolized into fumarate, then malate, and then oxaloacetate. Oxaloacetate may be transported into the cytosol to form phosphoenol pyruvate and other gluconeogenic intermediates. Propionyl-CoA is therefore an important precursor to glucose.

This enzyme's substrate, Propionyl-CoA, is the end product of odd-chain fatty acid metabolism, including most methylated fatty acids. In addition, the amino acids valine, isoleucine, methionine, and sometimes threonine are also metabolized into propionyl-CoA, and so this enzyme is also involved their metabolism.

== Structure ==
Propionyl-CoA carboxylase (PCC) is a 750 kDa alpha(6)-beta(6)-dodecamer. (Only approximately 540 kDa is native enzyme. ) The alpha subunits are arranged as monomers, decorating the central beta-6 hexameric core. Said core is oriented as a short cylinder with a hole along its axis.

The alpha subunit of PCC contains the biotin carboxylase (BC) and biotin carboxyl carrier protein (BCCP) domains. A domain known as the BT domain is also located on the alpha subunit and is essential for interactions with the beta subunit. The 8-stranded anti-parallel beta barrel fold of this domain is particularly interesting. The beta subunit contains the carboxyltransferase (CT) activity.

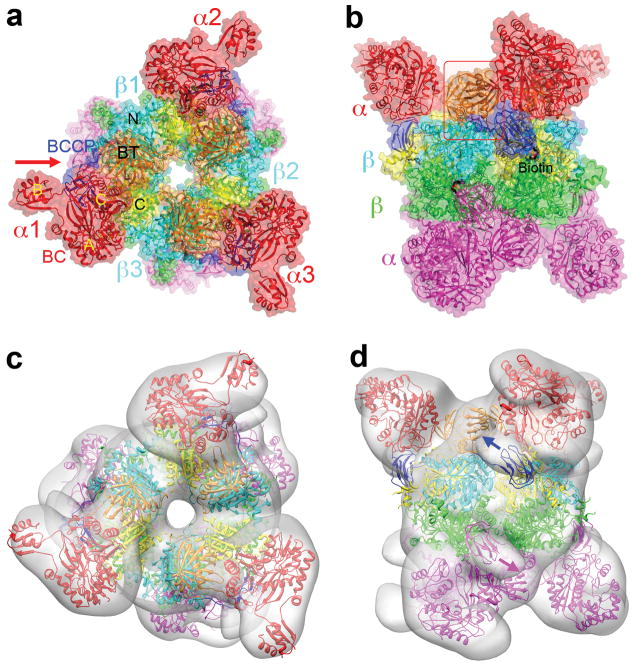
Figure 1.(a). Schematic drawing of the structure of the RpPCCα-RdPCCβ chimera, viewed down the three-fold symmetry axis. Domains in the α and β subunits in the top half of the structure are given different colors, and those in the first α and β subunits are labeled. The α and β subunits in the bottom half are colored in magenta and green, respectively. The red arrow indicates the viewing direction of panel b. (b). Structure of the RpPCCα-RdPCCβ chimera, viewed down the two-fold symmetry axis. The red rectangle indicates the region shown in detail in Fig. 2a. (c). Cryo-EM reconstruction of HsPCC at 15 Å resolution, viewed in the same orientation as panel a. The atomic model of the chimera was fit into the cryo-EM envelope. (d). The cryo-EM reconstruction viewed in the same orientation as panel b. The arrows indicate a change in the BCCP position that is needed to fit the cryo-EM map. All the structure figures were produced with PyMOL (www.pymol.org), and the cryo-EM figures were produced with Chimera. This provides clear evidence of crucial dimeric interaction between alpha and beta subunits.

The BC and CT sites are approximately 55 Å apart, indicative of the entire BCCP domain translocating during catalysis of the carboxylation of propionyl-CoA. This provides clear evidence of crucial dimeric interaction between alpha and beta subunits.

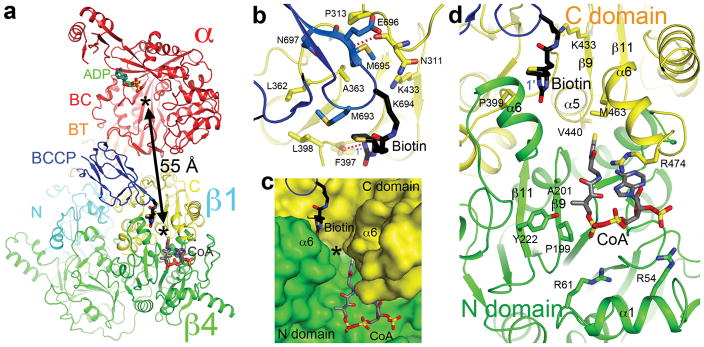
Figure 2.(a). Schematic drawing of the relative positioning of the BC and CT active sites in the holoenzyme. One α subunit and a β2 dimer (β1 from one layer and β4 from the other layer) are shown, and the viewing direction is the same as Fig. 1b. The two active sites are indicated with the stars, separated by 55 Å distance. The bound positions of ADP in complex with E. coli BC 18 and that of CoA in complex with the 12S subunit of transcarboxylase 21 are also shown. (b). Detailed interactions between BCCP-biotin and the C domain of a β subunit. Hydrogen-bonding interactions are indicated with the dashed lines in red. The N1′ atom of biotin is labeled as 1′, hydrogen-bonded to the main-chain carbonyl of Phe397. (c). Molecular surface of the CT active site, showing a deep canyon where both substrates are bound. (d). Schematic drawing of the CT active site.

The biotin-binding pocket of PCC is hydrophobic and highly conserved. Biotin and propionyl-CoA bind perpendicular to each other in the oxyanion hole-containing active site. The native enzyme to biotin ratio has been determined to be one mole native enzyme to 4 moles biotin. The N1 of biotin is thought to be the active site base.

Site-directed mutagenesis at D422 shows a change in the substrate specificity of the propionyl-CoA binding site, thus indicating this residue's importance in PCC's catalytic activity. In 1979, inhibition by phenylglyoxal determined that a phosphate group from either propionyl-CoA or ATP reacts with an essential arginine residue in the active site during catalysis. Later (2004), it was suggested that Arginine-338 serves to orient the carboxyphosphate intermediate for optimal carboxylation of biotin.

The KM values for ATP, propionyl-CoA, and bicarbonate has been determined to be 0.08 mM, 0.29 mM, and 3.0 mM, respectively. The isoelectric point falls at pH 5.5. PCC's structural integrity is conserved over the temperature range of -50 to 37 degrees Celsius and the pH range of 6.2 to 8.8. Optimum pH was shown to be between 7.2 and 8.8 without biotin bound. With biotin, optimum pH is 8.0-8.5.

== Mechanism ==
The normal catalytic reaction mechanism involves a carbanion intermediate and does not proceed through a concerted process. Figure 3 shows a probable pathway.

Figure 3. Probable PCC Mechanism

The reaction has been shown to be slightly reversible at low propionyl-CoA flux.

== Subunit genes ==
Human propionyl-CoA carboxylase contains two subunits, each encoded by a separate gene:

propionyl Coenzyme A carboxylase, alpha polypeptide
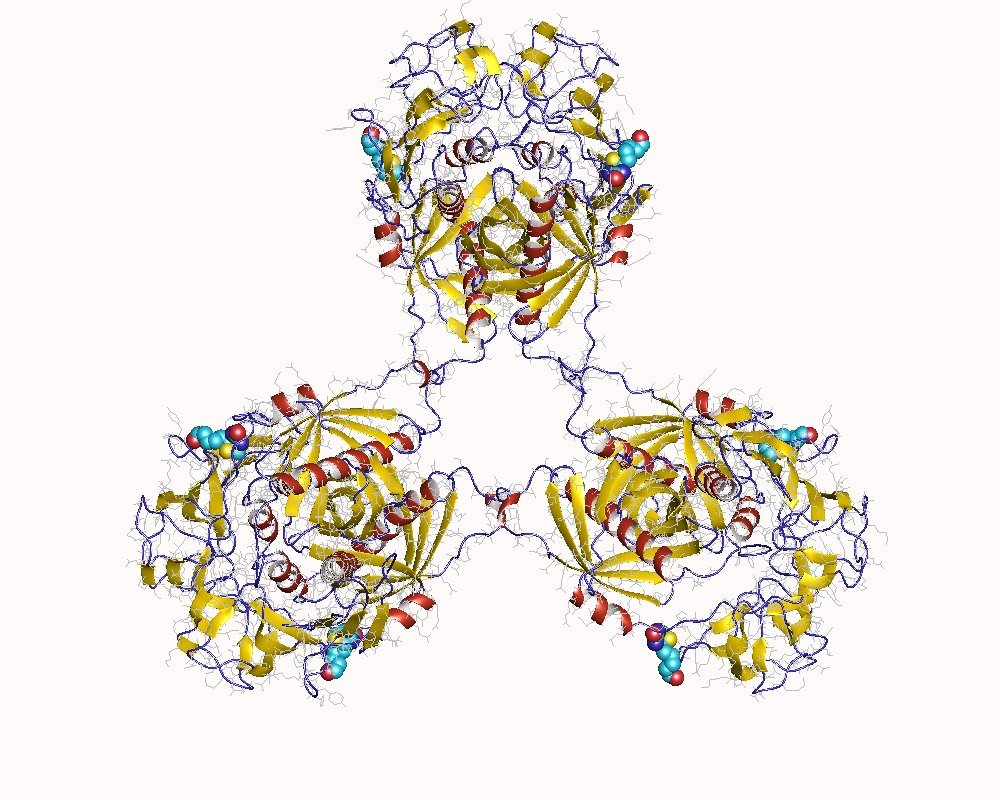
- Propionyl-CoA carboxylase A homo6mer, Methylorubrum extorquens

Identifiers
- Symbol: PCCA
- NCBI gene: 5095
- HGNC: 8653
- OMIM: 232000
- RefSeq: NM_000282
- UniProt: P05165

Other data
- EC number: 6.4.1.3
- Locus: Chr. 13 q32
Search for
- Structures: Swiss-model
- Domains: InterPro

propionyl Coenzyme A carboxylase, beta polypeptide
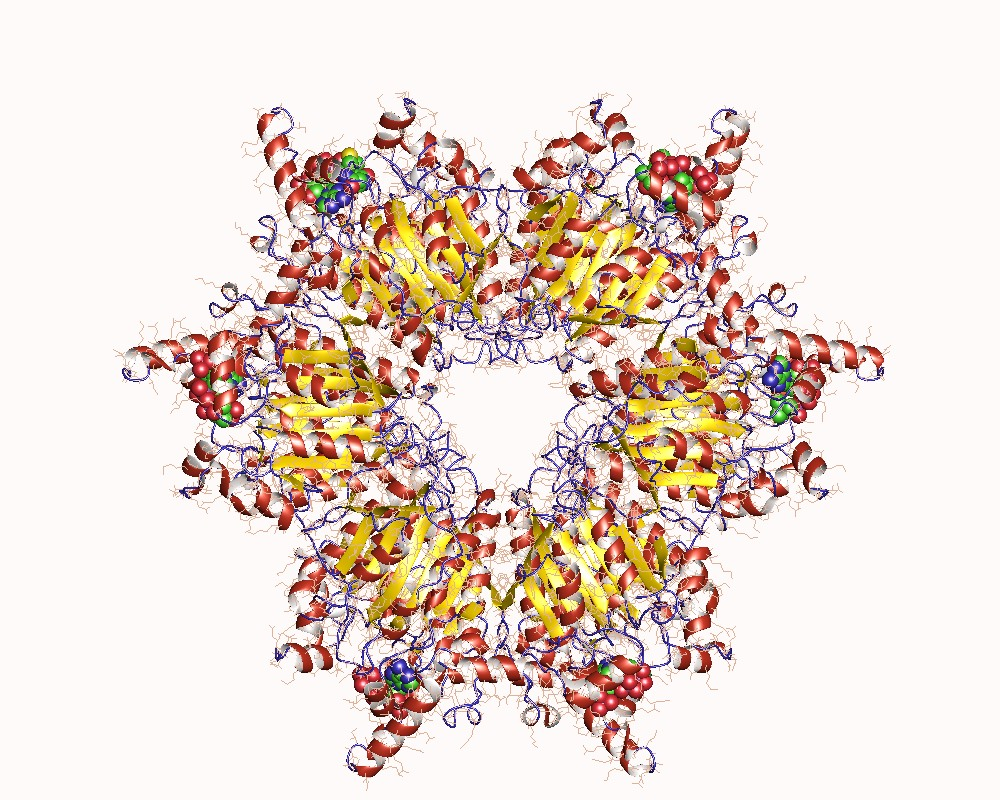
- Propionyl-CoA carboxylase B homo6mer, Methylorubrum extorquens

Identifiers
- Symbol: PCCB
- NCBI gene: 5096
- HGNC: 8654
- OMIM: 232050
- RefSeq: NM_000532
- UniProt: P05166

Other data
- EC number: 6.4.1.3
- Locus: Chr. 3 q21-q22
Search for
- Structures: Swiss-model
- Domains: InterPro

== Pathology ==
A deficiency is associated with propionic acidemia.

PCC activity is the most sensitive indicator of biotin status tested to date. In future pregnancy studies, the use of lymphocyte PCC activity data should prove valuable in assessment of biotin status.

=== Intragenic complementation ===
When multiple copies of a polypeptide encoded by a gene form an aggregate, this protein structure is referred to as a multimer. When a multimer is formed from polypeptides produced by two different mutant alleles of a particular gene, the mixed multimer may exhibit greater functional activity than the unmixed multimers formed by each of the mutants alone. In such a case, the phenomenon is referred to as intragenic complementation.

PCC is a heteropolymer composed of α and β subunits in a α_{6}β_{6} structure. Mutations in PCC, either in the α subunit (PCCα) or β subunit (PCCβ) can cause propionic acidemia in humans. When different mutant skin fibroblast cell lines defective in PCCβ were fused in pairwise combinations, the β heteromultimeric protein formed as a result often exhibited a higher level of activity than would be expected based on the activities of the parental enzymes. This finding of intragenic complementation indicated that the multimeric structure of PCC allows cooperative interactions between the constituent PCCβ monomers that can generate a more functional form of the holoenzyme.

== Regulation ==
=== Of Propionyl-CoA Carboxylase ===
a. Carbamazepine (antiepileptic drug): significantly lowers enzyme levels in the liver

b. E. coli chaperonin proteins groES and groEL: essential for folding and assembly of human PCC heteromeric subunits

c. Bicarbonate: negative cooperativity

d. Mg^{2+} and MgATP^{2−}: allosteric activation

=== By Propionyl-CoA Carboxylase ===
a. 6-Deoxyerythronolide B: decrease in PCC levels lead to increased production

b. Glucokinase in pancreatic beta cells: precursor of beta-PCC shown to decrease KM and increase Vmax; activation

== See also ==
- Anaplerotic reactions
- Propionic acidemia
