= Cob(I)yrinic acid a,c-diamide adenosyltransferase =

Class of enzymes

ATP:corrinoid adenosyltransferase
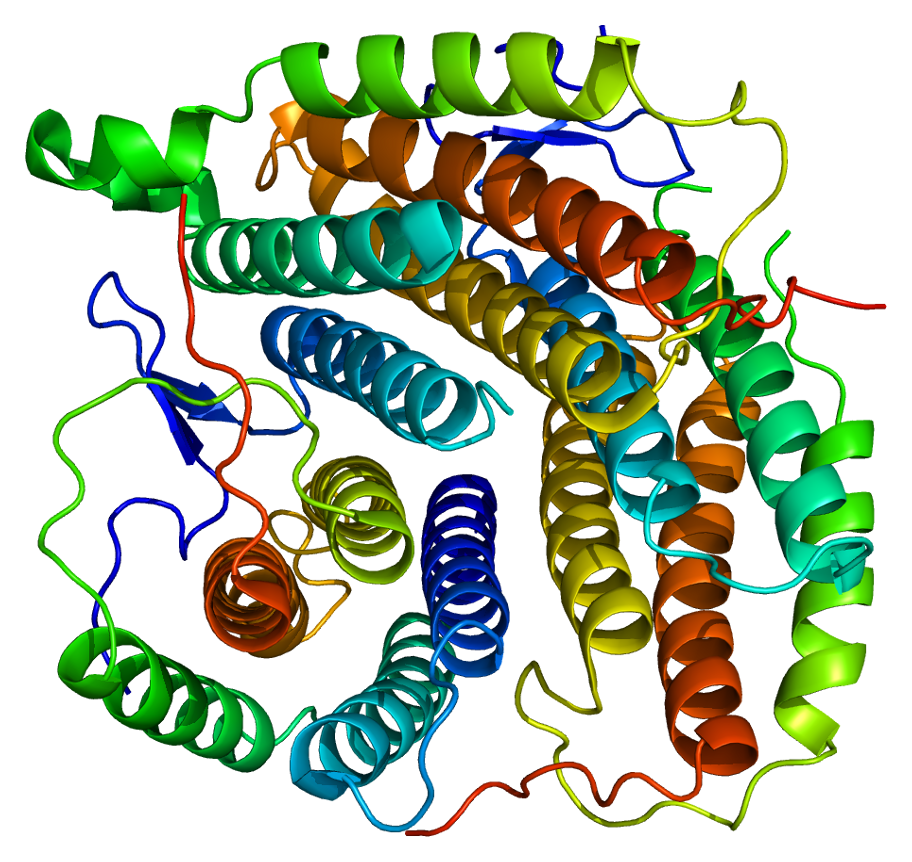
- Human mitochondrial Cob(I)yrinic acid a,c-diamide adenosyltransferase, MMAB.

Identifiers
- EC no.: 2.5.1.17
- CAS no.: 37277-84-2

Databases
- BRENDA: enzyme data
- ExPASy: NiceZyme view
- KEGG: enzyme entry
- MetaCyc: metabolic pathway
- Rhea: reactions
- PDB structures: RCSB PDB PDBe PDBsum
- Gene Ontology: AmiGO / QuickGO
Search
- PMC: articles
- PubMed: articles
- NCBI: proteins

ATP:corrinoid adenosyltransferase
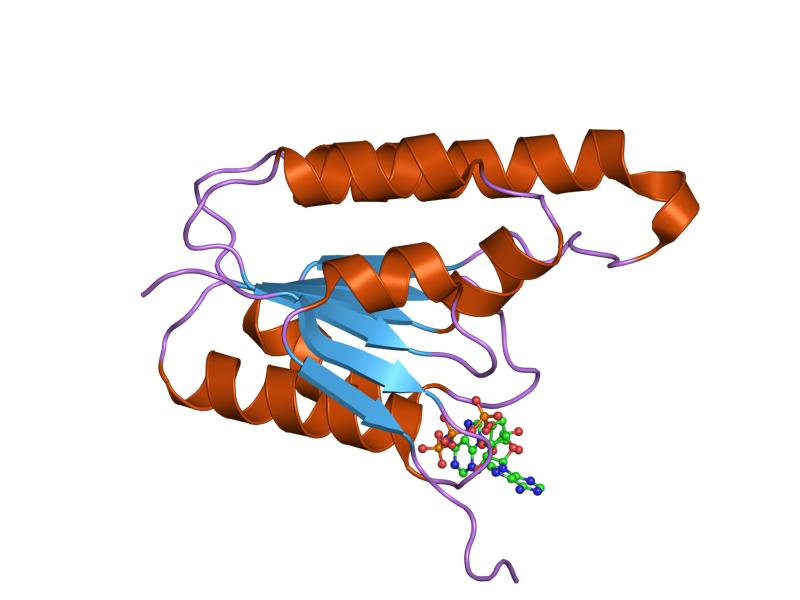
- the three-dimensional structure of atp:corrinoid adenosyltransferase from salmonella typhimurium. apo-atp form

Identifiers
- Symbol: CobA_CobO_BtuR
- Pfam: PF02572
- Pfam clan: CL0023
- InterPro: IPR003724
- SCOP2: 1g64 / SCOPe / SUPFAM
Available protein structures:
- PDB: IPR003724 PF02572 (ECOD; PDBsum)
- AlphaFold: IPR003724; PF02572

Cobalamin adenosyltransferase (PduO/EutT)
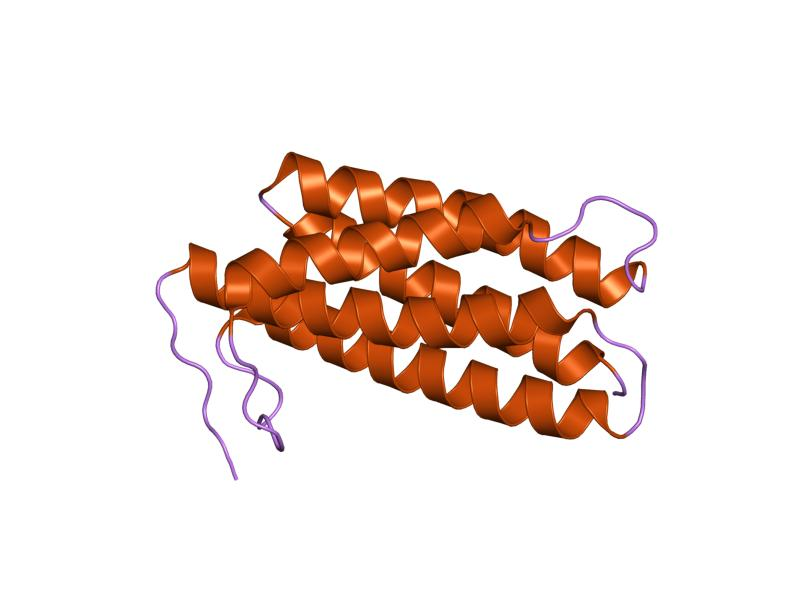
- crystal structure of conserved protein 0546 from thermoplasma acidophilum

Identifiers
- Symbol: Cob_adeno_trans
- Pfam: PF01923
- InterPro: IPR002779
- SCOP2: 1nog / SCOPe / SUPFAM
Available protein structures:
- PDB: IPR002779 PF01923 (ECOD; PDBsum)
- AlphaFold: IPR002779; PF01923

In molecular biology, cob(I)yrinic acid a,c-diamide adenosyltransferase (also known as ATP:cob(I)alamin adenosyltransferase or ATP:corrinoid adenosyltransferase) EC 2.5.1.17 is an enzyme which catalyses the conversion of cobalamin (vitamin B12) into one of its coenzyme forms, adenosylcobalamin (coenzyme B12, AdoCbl). Adenosylcobalamin is required as a cofactor for the activity of certain enzymes. AdoCbl contains an adenosyl moiety liganded to the cobalt ion of cobalamin via a covalent Co-C bond.

ATP:cob(I)alamin adenosyltransferases are classed into three groups: CobA-type, EutT-type and PduO-type. Each of the three enzyme types appears to be specialised for particular AdoCbl-dependent enzymes or for the de novo synthesis of AdoCbl. PduO and EutT are distantly related, sharing short conserved motifs, while CobA is evolutionarily unrelated and is an example of convergent evolution.

The CobA group includes the ATP:cob(I)alamin adenosyltransferases CobA (Salmonella typhimurium), CobO (Pseudomonas denitrificans), and ButR (Escherichia coli). There is a high degree of sequence identity between these proteins. CobA is responsible for attaching the adenosyl moiety from ATP to the cobalt ion of the corrin ring, necessary for the conversion of cobalamin to adenosylcobalamin. PduO functions to convert cobalamin to AdoCbl for 1,2-propanediol degradation, while EutT produces AdoCbl for ethanolamine utilisation.

== Synonyms ==
This enzyme is also known as:

- Cobalamin adenosyltransferase
- ATP:cob(I)alamin adenosyltransferase
- ATP:corrinoid adenosyltransferase

== See also ==
- Cobalamin biosynthesis
