= Odd-chain fatty acid =

Fatty acid with an odd number of carbon atoms

Margaric acid with its seventeen carbon atoms is an important odd-chain fatty acid.

Odd-chain fatty acids are those fatty acids that contain an odd number of carbon atoms. In addition to being classified according to their saturation or unsaturation, fatty acids are also classified according to their odd or even numbers of constituent carbon atoms. With respect to natural abundance, most fatty acids are even chain, e.g. palmitic (C16) and stearic (C18). In terms of physical properties, odd and even fatty acids are similar, generally being colorless, soluble in alcohols, and often somewhat oily. The odd-chain fatty acids are biosynthesized and metabolized slightly differently from the even-chained relatives. In addition to the usual C12-C22 long chain fatty acids, some very long chain fatty acids (VLCFAs) are also known. Some of these VLCFAs are also of the odd-chain variety.

== Metabolism ==
=== Biosynthesis ===
The most common OCFA are the saturated C15 and C17 derivatives, respectively pentadecylic acid and margaric acid. Even-chained fatty acids are synthesized by assembling acetyl-CoA precursors. Because the segments are each two carbons in length the resulting fatty acid has an even number of carbon atoms in it. However, propionyl-CoA instead of acetyl-CoA is used as the primer for the biosynthesis of long-chain fatty acids with an odd number of carbon atoms.

=== Degradation ===
Beta oxidation of odd-numbered fatty acids

Compared to the oxidation of even-numbered fatty acids, the oxidation of odd-chain fatty acids produces propionyl-CoA in addition to acetyl-CoA, which means that the oxidation requires three additional enzymes. The first is propionyl-CoA carboxylase. This enzyme is responsible for carboxylating the α-carbon of a propionyl-CoA to produce D-methylmalonyl-CoA. After this, methylmalonyl-CoA epimerase carries out an isomerization reaction. Specifically, the D-isomer produced by the carboxylase reaction is transformed into the L-isomer of methylmalonyl-CoA. This is a recently discovered enzyme, it was researched during the late 1900s and the first publication was in 1961. Researchers concluded that there was indeed a racemic reaction prior to reaching succinyl-CoA. Finally, methylmalonyl-CoA mutase, a vitamin B_{12}-dependent enzyme, converts L-methylmalonyl-CoA into succinyl-CoA using a free radical mechanism. Succinyl-CoA is an intermediate of the TCA cycle and can readily enter there.

== Examples ==
Lipid number	Name		Salt/Ester Name		Formula		Mass (g/mol)	Diagram
Lipid number	Common	Systematic	Common	Systematic	Molecular	Structural	Mass (g/mol)	Diagram
C3:0	Propionic acid	Propanoic acid	Propionate	Propanoate	C_{3}H_{6}O_{2}	CH_{3}CH_{2}COOH	74.08	
C15:0	Pentadecylic acid	Pentadecanoic acid	Pentadecanoate	Pentadecanoate	C_{15}H_{30}O_{2}	CH_{3}(CH_{2})_{13}CO_{2}H	242.40	
C17:0	Margaric acid	Heptadecanoic acid	Margarate	Heptadecanoate	C_{17}H_{34}O_{2}	CH_{3}(CH_{2})_{15}CO_{2}H	270.45	
C17:1	Heptadecenoic acid	Cis-10-heptadecenoic acid	Heptadecenoate	Cis-10-heptadecenoat	C_{17}H_{32}O_{2}	CH_{3}-(CH_{2})_{7}-CH=CH-(CH_{2})_{7}-COOH	268.4	

== Occurrence ==
OCFAs are found particularly in ruminant fat and milk (e.g. pentadecylic acid). Some plant-based fatty acids also have an odd number of carbon atoms and Phytanic fatty acid absorbed from the plant chlorophyll has multiple methyl branch points. As a result, it breaks down into three odd-numbered 3C Propionyl segments as well as three even-numbered 2C Acetyl segments and one even numbered 4C Isobutynoyl segment. In humans, propionic acid is produced by intestinal bacteria in the gut. In humans, in sharp contrast to butyrate and octanoate, the odd-chain SCFA, propionate, has no inhibitory effect on glycolysis and does not stimulate ketogenesis. Odd-chain and branched-chain fatty acids, which form propionyl-CoA, can serve as minor precursors for gluconeogenesis.
