= MMADHC =

Protein-coding gene in humans

Available structures
PDB	Ortholog search: PDBe RCSB
PDB	List of PDB id codes 5CUZ, 5CV0

Identifiers
- Aliases: MMADHC, C2orf25, CL25022, cblD, methylmalonic aciduria and homocystinuria, cblD type, metabolism of cobalamin associated D
- External IDs: OMIM: 611935; MGI: 1923786; HomoloGene: 9248; GeneCards: MMADHC; OMA:MMADHC - orthologs

Gene location (Human)
Chr.	Chromosome 2 (human)
Band	2q23.2	Start	149,569,637 bp
Band	2q23.2	End	149,587,778 bp

Gene location (Mouse)
Chr.	Chromosome 2 (mouse)
Band	2|2 C1.1	Start	50,169,893 bp
Band	2|2 C1.1	End	50,186,813 bp
RNA expression pattern
Bgee	Human / Mouse (ortholog); Top expressed in: palpebral conjunctiva; epithelium of nasopharynx; amniotic fluid; Skeletal muscle tissue of rectus abdominis; biceps brachii; vastus lateralis muscle; parotid gland; Skeletal muscle tissue of biceps brachii; parietal pleura; oral cavity / Top expressed in: interventricular septum; temporal muscle; digastric muscle; seminiferous tubule; sternocleidomastoid muscle; soleus muscle; vastus lateralis muscle; extraocular muscle; spermatid; triceps brachii muscle; More reference expression data
BioGPS	n/a
Gene ontology
Molecular function	protein binding
Cellular component	cytosol; mitochondrion; cytoplasm
Biological process	cobalamin metabolic process
Sources:Amigo / QuickGO
Orthologs
Species	Human	Mouse
Entrez	27249	109129
Ensembl	ENSG00000168288	ENSMUSG00000026766
UniProt	Q9H3L0	Q99LS1
RefSeq (mRNA)	NM_015702	NM_133839; NM_001348198; NM_001348199; NM_001348200
RefSeq (protein)	NP_056517	NP_598600; NP_001335127; NP_001335128; NP_001335129
Location (UCSC)	Chr 2: 149.57 – 149.59 Mb	Chr 2: 50.17 – 50.19 Mb
PubMed search
- Wikidata
View/Edit Human	View/Edit Mouse

Methylmalonic aciduria and homocystinuria type D protein, mitochondrial also known as MMADHC is a protein that in humans is encoded by the MMADHC gene.

== Function ==
This gene encodes a protein localized in cytosol and mitochondria that is involved in an early step of vitamin B_{12} metabolism. Vitamin B_{12} (cobalamin) is essential for normal development and survival in humans.

== Clinical significance ==
Mutations in this gene cause methylmalonic aciduria and homocystinuria type cblD (MMADHC), a disorder of cobalamin metabolism that is characterized by decreased levels of the coenzymes adenosylcobalamin and methylcobalamin.
