= ABCD4 =

Protein-coding gene in the species Homo sapiens

Identifiers
- Aliases: ABCD4, ABC41, EST352188, MAHCJ, P70R, P79R, PMP69, PXMP1L, ATP binding cassette subfamily D member 4
- External IDs: OMIM: 603214; MGI: 1349217; GeneCards: ABCD4
Enzyme activity
EC #	BRENDA	ExPASy	KEGG	MetaCyc
7.6.2.8	↗	↗	↗	↗

Gene location (Mouse)
Chr.	Chromosome 12 (mouse)
Band	12 D1|12 39.3 cM	Start	84,648,238 bp
Band	12 D1|12 39.3 cM	End	84,664,187 bp
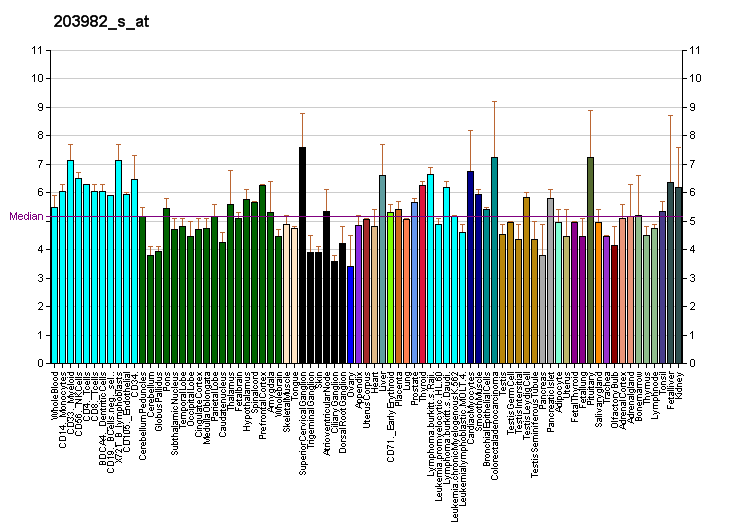

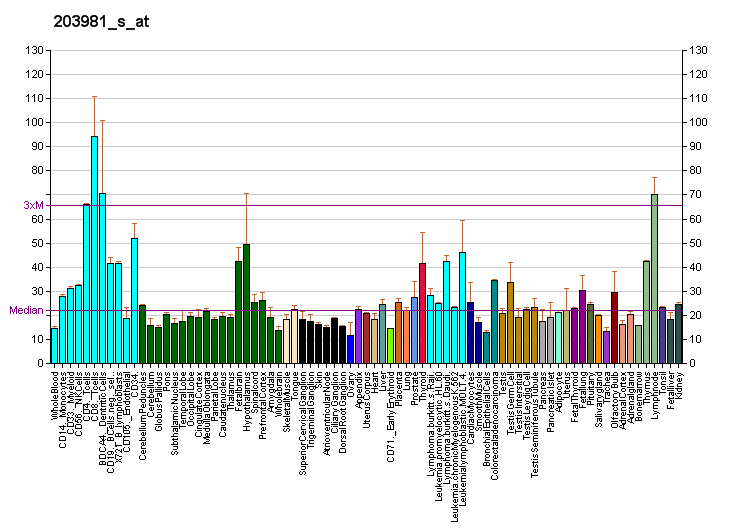
RNA expression pattern
Bgee	Human / Mouse (ortholog); n/a / Top expressed in: yolk sac; right kidney; epiblast; Rostral migratory stream; granulocyte; lip; embryo; Paneth cell; embryo; crypt of lieberkuhn of small intestine
BioGPS	More reference expression data
Gene ontology
Molecular function	ATPase activity; nucleotide binding; ATP binding; ATPase-coupled transmembrane transporter activity
Cellular component	membrane; endoplasmic reticulum membrane; lysosomal membrane; ATP-binding cassette (ABC) transporter complex; peroxisomal membrane; integral component of membrane; peroxisome
Biological process	cobalamin metabolic process; transmembrane transport; cellular response to leukemia inhibitory factor
Sources:Amigo / QuickGO
Orthologs
Databases	NCBI: entry; OMA: entry
Species	Human	Mouse
Entrez	5826	19300
Ensembl	ENSG00000119688	ENSMUSG00000021240
UniProt	O14678	O89016
RefSeq (mRNA)	NM_005050; NM_020324; NM_020325; NM_020326	NM_008992
RefSeq (protein)	NP_005041; NP_001340520; NP_001340521; NP_001340522; NP_001340523 NP_001340524; NP_001340525; NP_001340526; NP_001340527; NP_001340528; NP_001340529; NP_001340530; NP_001340531; NP_001340532; NP_001340533; NP_001340534; NP_001340535; NP_001340536; NP_001340537; NP_001340538; NP_001340539; NP_064720; NP_064730	NP_033018
Location (UCSC)	n/a	Chr 12: 84.65 – 84.66 Mb
PubMed search
- Wikidata
View/Edit Human	View/Edit Mouse

ATP-binding cassette sub-family D member 4 is a protein that in humans is encoded by the ABCD4 gene.

The protein encoded by this gene is a member of the superfamily of ATP-binding cassette (ABC) transporters. ABC proteins transport various molecules across extra- and intra-cellular membranes. ABC genes are divided into seven distinct subfamilies (ABC1, MDR/TAP, MRP, ALD, OABP, GCN20, White). This protein is a member of the ALD subfamily, which is involved in peroxisomal import of fatty acids and/or fatty acyl-CoAs in the organelle. All known peroxisomal ABC transporters are half transporters which require a partner half transporter molecule to form a functional homodimeric or heterodimeric transporter. The function of this peroxisomal membrane protein is unknown. However, it is speculated that it may function as a heterodimer for another peroxisomal ABC transporter and, therefore, may modify the adrenoleukodystrophy phenotype. It may also play a role in the process of peroxisome biogenesis. Alternative splicing results in at least two different transcript variants, one which is protein-coding and one which is probably not protein-coding.
