= Propionic acidemia =

Metabolic disorder

- Other names: Hyperglycinemia with ketoacidosis and leukopenia
- Propionic acid
- Specialty: Endocrinology
- Symptoms: Poor muscle tone, lethargy, vomiting
- Diagnostic method: Genetic testing; high levels of propionic acid in the urine
- Treatment: Low-protein diet
- Prognosis: Development may be normal, or patients may have lifelong learning disabilities

Propionic acidemia, also known as propionic aciduria or propionyl-CoA carboxylase deficiency (PCC deficiency), is a rare autosomal recessive metabolic disorder, classified as a branched-chain organic acidemia.

The disorder presents in the early neonatal period with poor feeding, vomiting, lethargy, and lack of muscle tone. Without treatment, death can occur quickly, due to secondary hyperammonemia, infection, cardiomyopathy, or brain damage.

== Symptoms and signs ==
Propionic acidemia can vary in severity. Severe propionic acidemia lead to symptoms already seen in newborns. Symptoms include poor feeding, vomiting, dehydration, acidosis, low muscle tone (hypotonia), seizures, and lethargy. The effects of propionic acidemia quickly become life-threatening.

Long-term complications can include intellectual disability, autism, chronic kidney disease, cardiomyopathy, and prolonged QTc interval.

== Pathophysiology ==
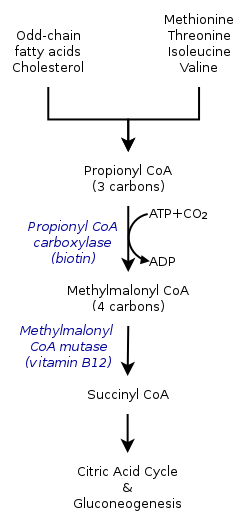
Propionic acidemia is caused by a defect in enzyme called propionyl-CoA carboxylase.

Propionic acidemia has an autosomal recessive pattern of inheritance.

In healthy individuals, enzyme propionyl-CoA carboxylase converts propionyl-CoA to methylmalonyl-CoA. This is one of many steps in the process of converting certain amino acids and fats into energy. Individuals with propionic acidemia cannot perform this conversion because the enzyme propionyl-CoA carboxylase is nonfunctional. The essential amino acids valine, methionine, isoleucine, and threonine can not be converted and this leads to a buildup of propionyl-CoA. Instead of being converted to methylmalonyl-CoA, propionyl-CoA is then converted into propionic acid, which builds up in the bloodstream. This in turn causes an accumulation of dangerous acids and toxins, which can cause damage to the organs.

In many cases, propionic acidemia can damage the brain, heart, kidney, liver, cause seizures and delays to normal development such as walking or talking. The accumulation of propionic acid is known to induce differential responses in different organs. The heart and liver are specific targets of the complication. The patient may need to be hospitalized to prevent breakdown of proteins within the body. Dietary needs must be closely managed.

Mutations in both copies of the PCCA or PCCB genes cause propionic acidemia. These genes contain instructions to form alpha- and beta-subunits of PCC, the enzyme called propionyl-CoA carboxylase.

PCC is required for the normal breakdown of the essential amino acids valine, isoleucine, threonine, and methionine, as well as certain odd-chained fatty-acids. Mutations in the PCCA or PCCB genes disrupt the function of the enzyme, preventing these acids from being metabolized. As a result, propionyl-CoA, propionic acid, ketones, ammonia, and other toxic compounds accumulate in the blood, causing the signs and symptoms of propionic acidemia. Hyperammonemia develops due to the inhibitory effects of propionyl-CoA on N-acetylglutamate synthase, indirectly resulting in slowing of the urea cycle.

== Diagnosis ==
Elevated metabolites of propionic acid (for example, 3-hydroxypropionate, 2-methylcitrate, tiglylglycine, propionylglycine) found in blood and urine along with normal activity of biotinidase and normal levels of methylmalonic acid.

== Management ==
Patients with propionic acidemia should be started as early as possible on a low protein diet. In addition to a protein mixture that is devoid of methionine, threonine, valine, and isoleucine, the patient should also receive L-carnitine treatment and should be given antibiotics 10 days per month in order to remove the intestinal propiogenic flora. The patient should have diet protocols prepared for them with a "well day diet" with low protein content, a "half emergency diet" containing half of the protein requirements, and an "emergency diet" with no protein content. These patients are under the risk of severe hyperammonemia during infections that can lead to comatose states.

Liver transplant is gaining a role in the management of these patients, with small series showing improved quality of life.

== Epidemiology ==
Propionic acidemia is inherited in an autosomal recessive pattern and is found in about 1 in 35,000 live births in the United States. The condition appears to be more common in Saudi Arabia, with a frequency of about 1 in 3,000. The condition also appears to be common in Amish, Mennonite and other populations with higher frequency of consanguinity.

== History ==
In 1957, a male child was born with poor mental development, repeated attacks of acidosis, and high levels of ketones and glycine in the blood. Upon dietary testing, Dr. Barton Childs discovered that his symptoms worsened when given the amino acids leucine, isoleucine, valine, methionine, and threonine. In 1961, the medical team at Johns Hopkins Hospital in Baltimore, Maryland published the case, calling the disorder ketotic hyperglycinemia. In 1969, using data from the original patient's sister, scientists established that propionic acidemia was a recessive disorder, and that propionic acidemia and methylmalonic acidemia are caused by deficiencies in the same enzyme pathway.

== See also ==
- Methylmalonic acidemia
- Isovaleric acidemia
- Maple syrup urine disease
