= MMAA =

Protein-coding gene in the species Homo sapiens

Available structures
PDB	Ortholog search: PDBe RCSB
PDB	List of PDB id codes 2WWW

Identifiers
- Aliases: MMAA, cblA, methylmalonic aciduria (cobalamin deficiency) cblA type, metabolism of cobalamin associated A
- External IDs: OMIM: 607481; MGI: 1923805; HomoloGene: 14586; GeneCards: MMAA; OMA:MMAA - orthologs

Gene location (Human)
Chr.	Chromosome 4 (human)
Band	4q31.21	Start	145,599,042 bp
Band	4q31.21	End	145,660,033 bp

Gene location (Mouse)
Chr.	Chromosome 8 (mouse)
Band	8|8 C1	Start	79,990,227 bp
Band	8|8 C1	End	80,021,566 bp
RNA expression pattern
Bgee	Human / Mouse (ortholog); Top expressed in: secondary oocyte; tibialis anterior muscle; pancreatic ductal cell; testicle; deltoid muscle; gonad; right lobe of liver; islet of Langerhans; endothelial cell; buccal mucosa cell / Top expressed in: interventricular septum; saccule; otic vesicle; right kidney; ascending aorta; proximal tubule; aortic valve; motor neuron; Paneth cell; brown adipose tissue; More reference expression data
BioGPS	n/a
Gene ontology
Molecular function	nucleotide binding; hydrolase activity; GTPase activity; protein binding; GTP binding; identical protein binding; protein homodimerization activity
Cellular component	mitochondrial matrix; mitochondrion; intracellular anatomical structure
Biological process	cobalamin metabolic process; cobalamin biosynthetic process; short-chain fatty acid catabolic process; phosphorelay signal transduction system; signal transduction
Sources:Amigo / QuickGO
Orthologs
Species	Human	Mouse
Entrez	166785	109136
Ensembl	ENSG00000151611	ENSMUSG00000037022
UniProt	Q8IVH4; Q495G5	Q8C7H1
RefSeq (mRNA)	NM_172250; NM_001375644	NM_133823; NM_001363470; NM_001363471; NM_001363472
RefSeq (protein)	NP_758454	NP_598584; NP_001350399; NP_001350400; NP_001350401
Location (UCSC)	Chr 4: 145.6 – 145.66 Mb	Chr 8: 79.99 – 80.02 Mb
PubMed search
- Wikidata
View/Edit Human	View/Edit Mouse

Methylmalonic aciduria type A protein, mitochondrial also known as MMAA is a protein that in humans is encoded by the MMAA gene.

== Function ==
The protein encoded by this gene is involved in the translocation of cobalamin into the mitochondrion, where it is used in the final steps of adenosylcobalamin synthesis. Adenosylcobalamin is a coenzyme required for the activity of methylmalonyl-CoA mutase.

== Clinical significance ==
Mutations in the MMAA gene are associated with methylmalonic acidemia.
