= MMAB =

Protein-coding gene in the species Homo sapiens

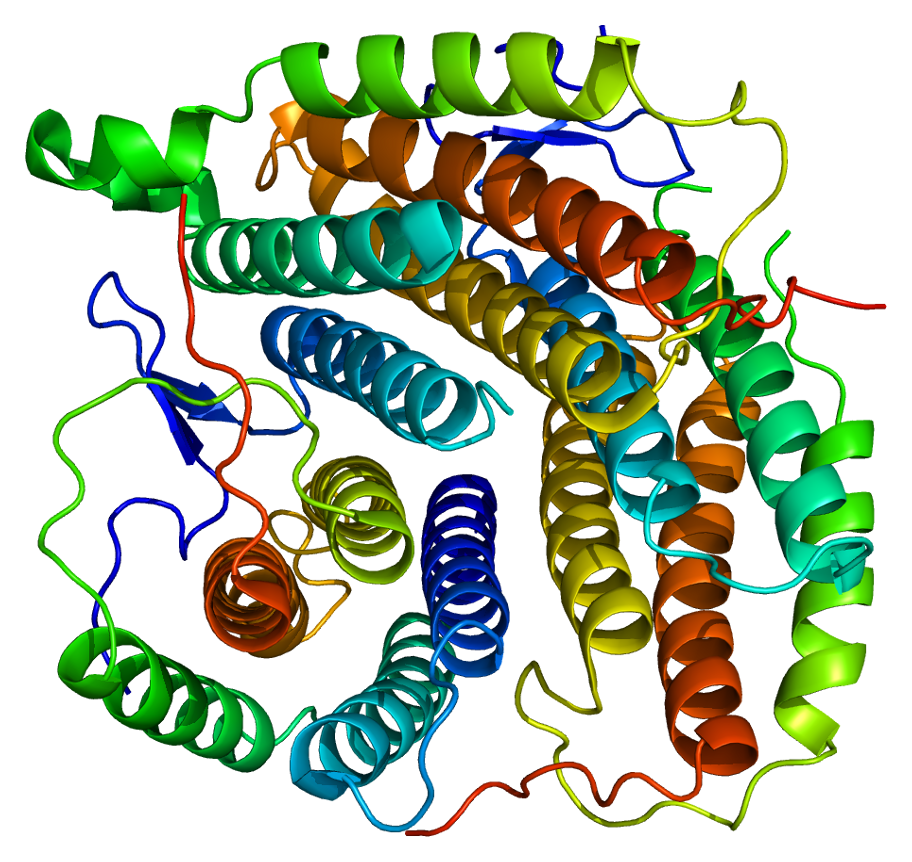

Identifiers
- Aliases: MMAB, ATR, CFAP23, cblB, cob, methylmalonic aciduria (cobalamin deficiency) cblB type, metabolism of cobalamin associated B
- External IDs: OMIM: 607568; MGI: 1924947; GeneCards: MMAB
Available structures
PDB	Ortholog search: PDBe RCSB
PDB	List of PDB id codes 2IDX

Gene location (Human)
Chr.	Chromosome 12 (human)
Band	12q24.11	Start	109,553,715 bp
Band	12q24.11	End	109,573,580 bp

Gene location (Mouse)
Chr.	Chromosome 5 (mouse)
Band	5|5 F	Start	114,569,095 bp
Band	5|5 F	End	114,582,121 bp
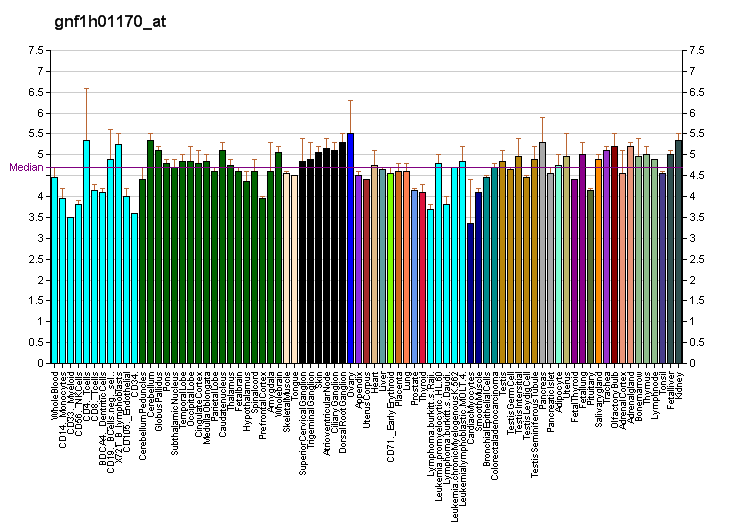
RNA expression pattern
Bgee	Human / Mouse (ortholog); Top expressed in: right lobe of liver; right adrenal cortex; left adrenal gland; left adrenal cortex; apex of heart; C1 segment; pancreatic ductal cell; mucosa of transverse colon; right auricle of heart; olfactory zone of nasal mucosa / Top expressed in: lumbar spinal ganglion; muscle of thigh; interventricular septum; otic vesicle; neural layer of retina; saccule; right kidney; ascending aorta; myocardium of ventricle; neural tube; More reference expression data
BioGPS	More reference expression data
Gene ontology
Molecular function	transferase activity; nucleotide binding; cob(I)yrinic acid a,c-diamide adenosyltransferase activity; ATP binding; protein binding; cobalamin binding
Cellular component	mitochondrial matrix; mitochondrion
Biological process	cobalamin metabolic process; cobalamin biosynthetic process
Sources:Amigo / QuickGO
Orthologs
Databases	NCBI: entry; OMA: entry
Species	Human	Mouse
Entrez	326625	77697
Ensembl	ENSG00000139428	ENSMUSG00000029575
UniProt	Q96EY8	Q9D273
RefSeq (mRNA)	NM_052845	NM_029956; NM_001347398
RefSeq (protein)	NP_443077	NP_001334327; NP_084232
Location (UCSC)	Chr 12: 109.55 – 109.57 Mb	Chr 5: 114.57 – 114.58 Mb
PubMed search
- Wikidata
View/Edit Human	View/Edit Mouse

Cob(I)yrinic acid a,c-diamide adenosyltransferase, mitochondrial is an enzyme that in humans is encoded by the MMAB gene.

== Function ==
This gene encodes an enzyme (cob(I)yrinic acid a,c-diamide adenosyltransferase) that catalyzes the final step in the conversion of vitamin B_{12} into adenosylcobalamin (AdoCbl), a vitamin B_{12}-containing coenzyme for methylmalonyl-CoA mutase.

== Clinical significance ==
Mutations in the gene are the cause of vitamin B_{12}-dependent methylmalonic aciduria linked to the cblB complementation group.
