= Methylmalonyl-CoA mutase =

Mammalian protein found in Homo sapiens

MMUT
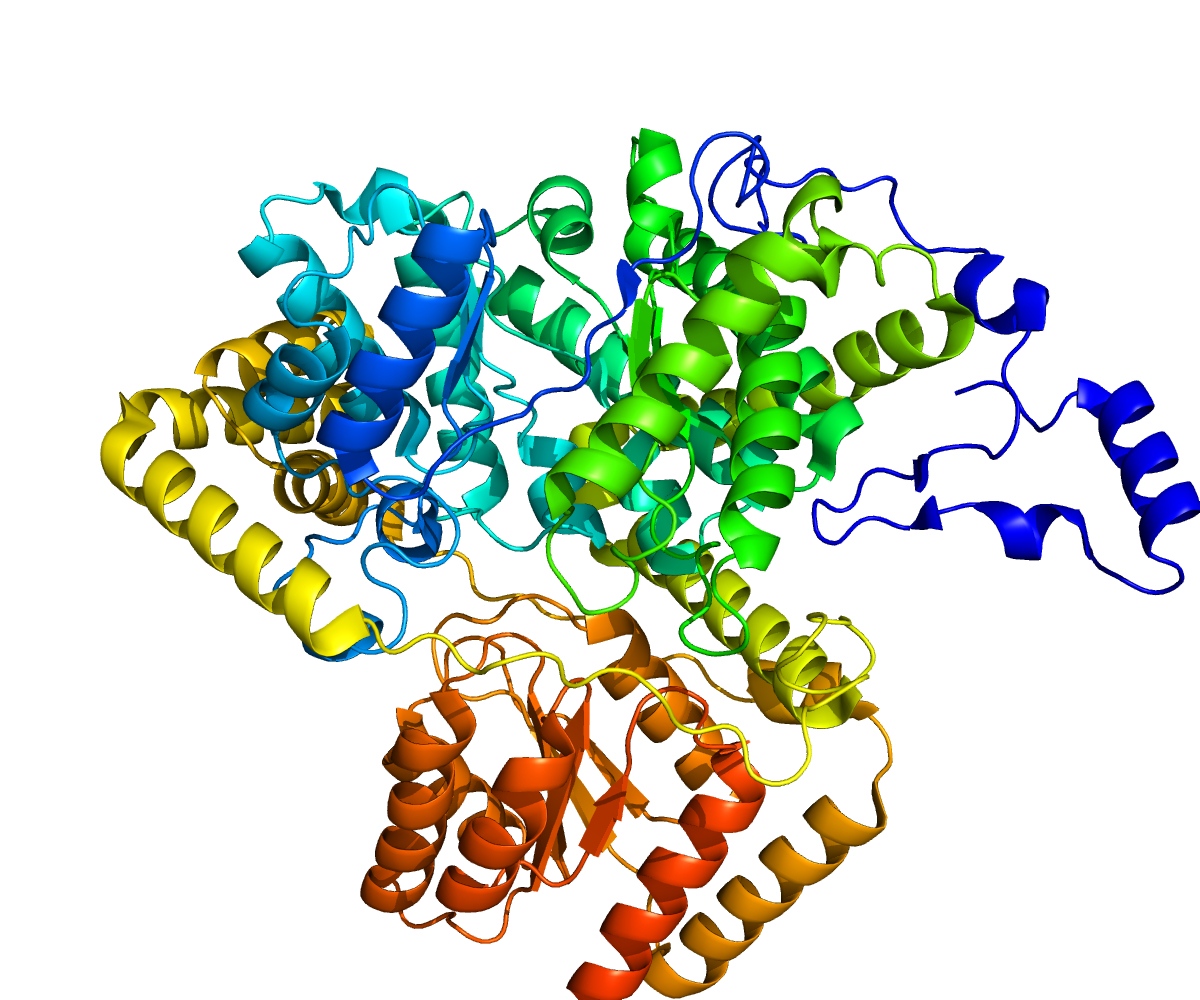

Identifiers
- Aliases: MMUT, MCM, methylmalonyl-CoA mutase, Methylmalonyl Coenzyme-A mutase, MUT
- External IDs: OMIM: 609058; MGI: 97239; GeneCards: MMUT
Available structures
PDB	Ortholog search: PDBe RCSB
PDB	List of PDB id codes 2XIJ, 2XIQ, 3BIC
Enzyme activity
EC #	BRENDA	ExPASy	KEGG	MetaCyc
5.4.99.2	↗	↗	↗	↗

Gene location (Human)
Chr.	Chromosome 6 (human)
Band	6p12.3	Start	49,430,360 bp
Band	6p12.3	End	49,463,253 bp

Gene location (Mouse)
Chr.	Chromosome 17 (mouse)
Band	17 B2|17 19.55 cM	Start	41,245,576 bp
Band	17 B2|17 19.55 cM	End	41,272,879 bp
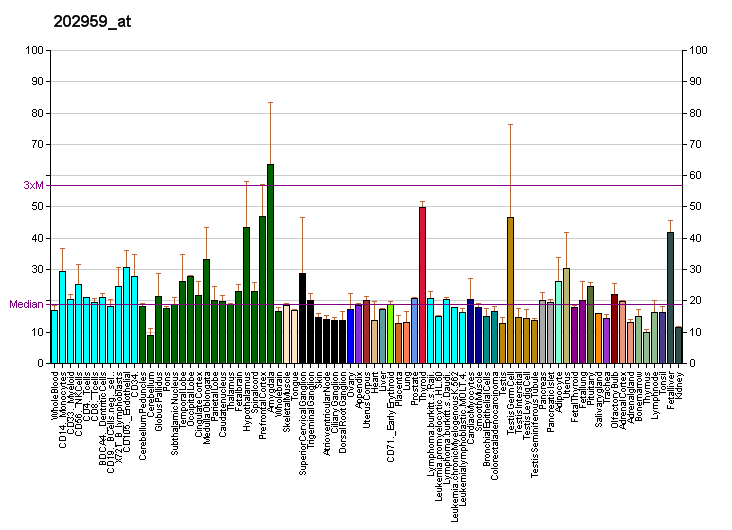

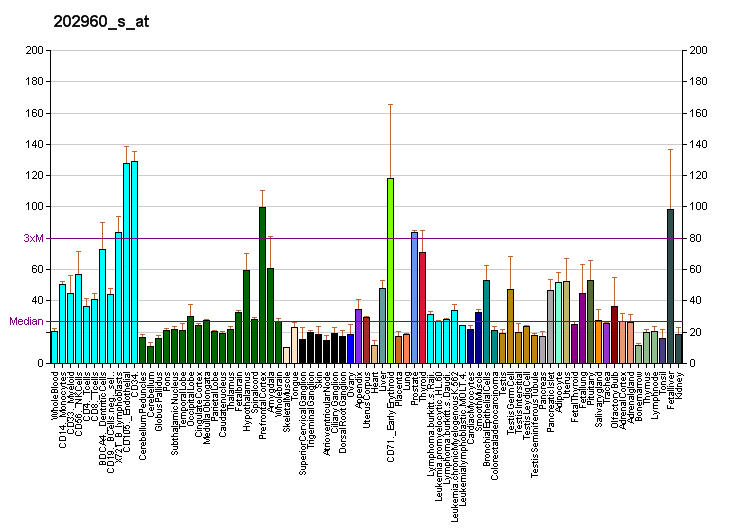
RNA expression pattern
Bgee	Human / Mouse (ortholog); Top expressed in: Epithelium of choroid plexus; oocyte; kidney tubule; mucosa of sigmoid colon; pancreatic ductal cell; endothelial cell; liver; jejunal mucosa; secondary oocyte; buccal mucosa cell / Top expressed in: brown adipose tissue; right kidney; human kidney; left lobe of liver; proximal tubule; parotid gland; Epithelium of choroid plexus; right ventricle; ciliary body; intercostal muscle; More reference expression data
BioGPS	More reference expression data
Gene ontology
Molecular function	modified amino acid binding; isomerase activity; catalytic activity; metal ion binding; intramolecular transferase activity; methylmalonyl-CoA mutase activity; GTPase activity; protein binding; cobalamin binding; identical protein binding; protein homodimerization activity
Cellular component	mitochondrial matrix; mitochondrion
Biological process	cobalamin metabolic process; homocysteine metabolic process; metabolism; post-embryonic development; positive regulation of GTPase activity; short-chain fatty acid catabolic process
Sources:Amigo / QuickGO
Orthologs
Databases	NCBI: entry; OMA: entry
Species	Human	Mouse
Entrez	4594	17850
Ensembl	ENSG00000146085	ENSMUSG00000023921
UniProt	P22033	P16332
RefSeq (mRNA)	NM_000255	NM_008650
RefSeq (protein)	NP_000246; NP_000246.2	NP_032676
Location (UCSC)	Chr 6: 49.43 – 49.46 Mb	Chr 17: 41.25 – 41.27 Mb
PubMed search
- Wikidata
View/Edit Human	View/Edit Mouse

methylmalonyl-CoA mutase

Identifiers
- EC no.: 5.4.99.2
- CAS no.: 9023-90-9

Databases
- BRENDA: enzyme data
- ExPASy: NiceZyme view
- KEGG: enzyme entry
- MetaCyc: metabolic pathway
- Rhea: reactions
- PDB structures: RCSB PDB PDBe PDBsum
- Gene Ontology: AmiGO / QuickGO
Search
- PMC: articles
- PubMed: articles
- NCBI: proteins

Methylmalonyl-CoA mutase (EC 5.4.99.2, MCM), mitochondrial, also known as methylmalonyl-CoA isomerase, is a protein that in humans is encoded by the MMUT gene (previously MUT). This vitamin B_{12}-dependent enzyme catalyzes the isomerization of methylmalonyl-CoA to succinyl-CoA in humans. Mutations in MMUT gene may lead to various types of methylmalonic aciduria.

MCM was first identified in rat liver and sheep kidney in 1955. In its latent form, it is 750 amino acids in length. Upon entry to the mitochondria, the 32 amino acid mitochondrial leader sequence at the N-terminus of the protein is cleaved, forming the fully processed monomer. The monomers then associate into homodimers, and bind AdoCbl (one for each monomer active site) to form the final, active holoenzyme form.

== Structure ==
=== Gene ===
The MUT gene lies on the chromosome location of 6p12.3 and consists of 13 exons, spanning over 35kb.

=== Protein ===
The mature enzyme is a homodimer with the N-terminal CoA binding domain and the C- terminal cobalamin-binding domain.

== Function ==
Methylmalonyl-CoA mutase is expressed in high concentrations in the kidney, in intermediate concentrations in the heart, ovaries, brain, muscle, and liver, and in low concentrations in the spleen. The enzyme can be found all throughout the central nervous system (CNS). MCM resides in the mitochondria, where a number of substances, including the branched-chain amino acids isoleucine and valine, as well as methionine, threonine, thymine and odd-chain fatty acids, are metabolized via methylmalonate semialdehyde (MMlSA) or propionyl-CoA (Pr-CoA) to a common compound - methylmalonyl-CoA (MMl-CoA). MCM catalyzes the reversible isomerisation of l‐methylmalonyl‐CoA to succinyl‐CoA, requiring cobalamin (vitamin B12) in the form of adenosylcobalamin (AdoCbl) as a cofactor. As an important step in propionate catabolism, this reaction is required for the degradation of odd-chain fatty acids, the amino acids valine, isoleucine, methionine, and threonine, and cholesterol, funneling metabolites from the breakdown of these amino acids into the tricarboxylic acid cycle.

Methylmalonyl-CoA mutase catalyzes the following reaction:

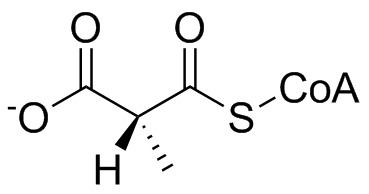
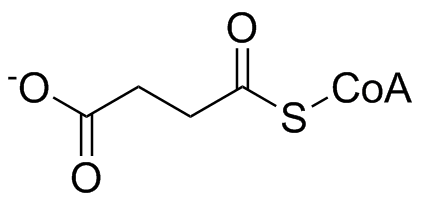
L-methylmalonyl-CoA	methylmalonyl-CoA mutase	Succinyl-CoA
	methylmalonyl-CoA mutase

The substrate of methylmalonyl-CoA mutase, methylmalonyl-CoA, is primarily derived from propionyl-CoA, a substance formed from the catabolism and digestion of isoleucine, valine, threonine, methionine, thymine, cholesterol, or odd-chain fatty acids. The product of the enzyme, succinyl-CoA, is a key molecule of the tricarboxylic acid cycle.

== Clinical significance ==
A deficiency of this enzyme is responsible for an inherited disorder of metabolism, methylmalonyl-CoA mutase deficiency, which is one of the causes of methylmalonic acidemia (also referred to as methylmalonic aciduria or MMA). MMA is an autosomal recessive inherited inborn error of metabolism, characterized by recurrent episodes of vomiting, lethargy, profound ketoacidosis, hyperammonemia, and pancytopenia in infancy, and may cause early death. Complications include cardiomyopathy, metabolic stroke, pancreatitis, and progressive renal failure.

Either mutations to the gene MUT (encodes methylmalonyl-CoA mutase), or MMAA (encodes a chaperone protein of methylmalonyl-CoA mutase, MMAA protein) can lead to methylmalonyl acidemia. Mutations to MUT can be categorized as either MUT^{0} (demonstrates no activity even in presence of excess AdoCbl), or MUT^{1} (demonstrates very low activity in presence of excess AdoCbl). Over half of the mutations of MUT are missense mutations while nonsense mutations comprise a significant remaining fraction (approximately 14%)

Common treatment methods for MMA include a liver transplant or a liver and kidney transplant to combat the renal disease of methylmalonic acidemia. However, detrimental neurological effects can continue to plague patients even after a successful operation. It is thought that this is due to the widespread presence of methylmalonyl-CoA mutase throughout the central nervous system. Due to the loss of functionality of the enzyme, substrate levels build up in the CNS. The substrate, L-methylmalonyl-CoA hydrolyzes to form methylmalonate (methylmalonic acid), a neurotoxic dicarboxylic acid that, due to the poor dicarboxylic acid transport capacities of the blood-brain barrier, is effectively trapped within the CNS, leading to neurological debilitation. To combat these effects perioperative anti-catabolic regimes and no diet discontinuation are recommended.

The murine model has proven an adequate and accurate way of studying the effects of MMA, and potential treatment methods.

== Mechanism ==
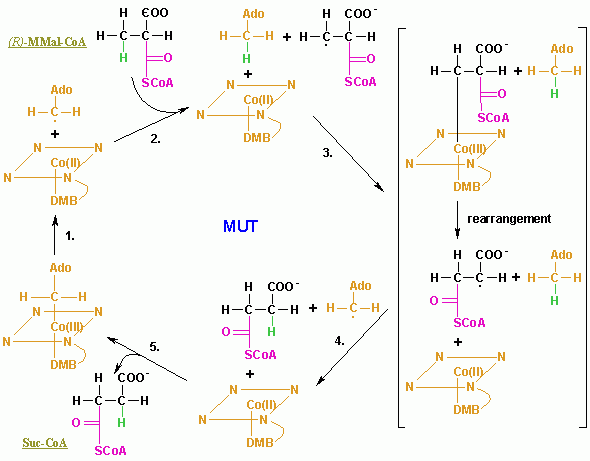
MCM's reaction mechanism

The MCM reaction mechanism begins with homolytic cleavage of AdoB12's C-Co(III) bond, the C and Co atoms each acquire one of the electrons that formed the cleaved electron pair bond. The Co ion, therefore, fluctuates between its Co(III) and Co(II) oxidation states [the two states are spectroscopically distinguishable: Co(III) is red and diamagnetic (no unpaired electrons), whereas Co(II) is yellow and paramagnetic (unpaired electrons)]. Hence, the role of coenzyme B-12 in the catalytic process is that of a reversible generator of a free radical. The C-Co(III) bond is weak, with a dissociation energy = 109 kJ/mol, and appears to be further weakened through steric interactions with the enzyme. The homolytic reaction is unusual in biology, as is the presence of a metal-carbon bond.

Methylmalonyl-CoA mutase is a member of the isomerase subfamily of adenosylcobalamin-dependent enzymes. Furthermore, it is classified as class I, as it is a ‘DMB-off’/’His-on’ enzyme. This refers to the nature of the AdoCbl cofactor in the active site of methylmalonyl CoA. AdoCbl is composed of a central cobalt-containing corrin ring, an upper axial ligand (β-axial ligand), and a lower axial ligand (α-axial ligand). In methylmalonyl-CoA mutase, the β-axial ligand 5’-deoxy-5’-adenosine reversibly dissociated to give the deoxyadenosyl radical. The α-axial ligand 5,6-dimethylbenzimidazole (DMB) is involved in organizing the active site to enable histidine-610 to bond with Co, instead of DMB (the reason for the ‘DMB-off’/’His-on’ notation). Binding of histidine-610 residue increases the rate of homolytic β-axial ligand – Co bond breakage by a factor of 10^{12}.

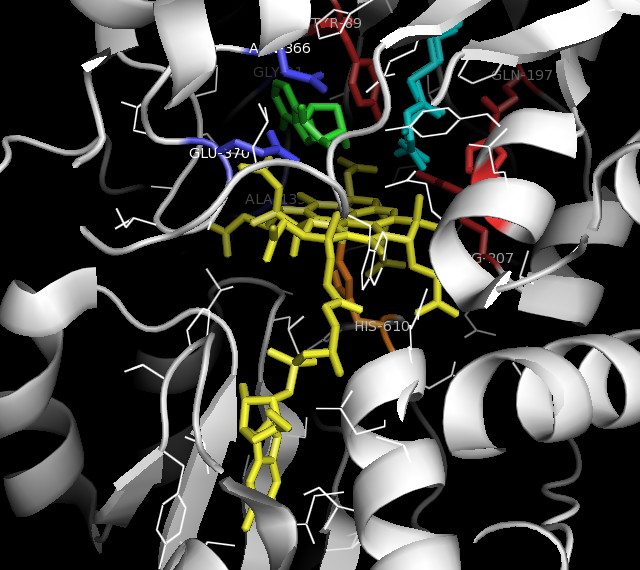
MCM active site. Corrin ring and α-axial ligand (DMB): (yellow), β-axial ligand: (green), substrate/product: (cyan), residues interacting with β-axial ligand: glu370, asn366, gly91, ala139 (blue), residues interacting with substrate: gln197, his244, arg207, tyr89 (red), and his610: (orange). Rendered from PDB 4REQ.

Other important residues of methylmalonyl-CoA mutase include Histidine-244, which acts as a general acid near the substrate and shields the radical species from side reactions involving oxygen, Glutamate-370, whose hydrogen bond with the 2’-OH group of the ribose of the β-axial ligand forces interaction between the β-axial ligand radical species and the substrate, and tyrosine-89 which stabilizes reactive radical intermediates and accounts for the stereo-selectivity of the enzyme.

The processing protein, MMAA protein, fills the important role of aiding cofactor loading and exchange. MMAA protein favors association with the MCM apoenzyme, and allows for the transfer of the AdoCbl cofactor to the enzyme active site. Furthermore, if the bound AdoCbl accrues oxidative damage during normal functioning, MMAA protein fosters exchange of the damaged cofactor for a new AdoCbl via a GTP-reliant pathway.

== Interactions ==
- MMAA
- Vitamin B12
- MeaB
- CoA-esters
- MMAB
- MMACHC
- MMADHC
