= Methylmalonyl-CoA =

Names
- Systematic IUPAC name (9R)-1-[(2R,3S,4R,5R)-5-(6-Amino-9H-purin-9-yl)-4-hydroxy-3-(phosphonooxy)oxolan-2-yl]-3,5,9-trihydroxy-8,8,20-trimethyl-3,5,10,14,19-pentaoxo-2,4,6-trioxa-18-thia-11,15-diaza-3λ^{5},5λ^{5}-diphosphahenicosan-21-oic acid

Identifiers
CAS Number	1264-45-5
3D model (JSmol)	Interactive image
ChEBI	CHEBI:16625
ChemSpider	110440
IUPHAR/BPS	5223
PubChem CID	123909
CompTox Dashboard (EPA)	DTXSID20925529
- InChI: InChI=1S/C25H40N7O19P3S/c1-12(23(37)38)24(39)55-7-6-27-14(33)4-5-28-21(36)18(35)25(2,3)9-48-54(45,46)51-53(43,44)47-8-13-17(50-52(40,41)42)16(34)22(49-13)32-11-31-15-19(26)29-10-30-20(15)32/h10-13,16-18,22,34-35H,4-9H2,1-3H3,(H,27,33)(H,28,36)(H,37,38)(H,43,44)(H,45,46)(H2,26,29,30)(H2,40,41,42)/t12?,13-,16-,17-,18+,22-/m1/s1 Key: MZFOKIKEPGUZEN-FBMOWMAESA-N; InChI=1/C25H40N7O19P3S/c1-12(23(37)38)24(39)55-7-6-27-14(33)4-5-28-21(36)18(35)25(2,3)9-48-54(45,46)51-53(43,44)47-8-13-17(50-52(40,41)42)16(34)22(49-13)32-11-31-15-19(26)29-10-30-20(15)32/h10-13,16-18,22,34-35H,4-9H2,1-3H3,(H,27,33)(H,28,36)(H,37,38)(H,43,44)(H,45,46)(H2,26,29,30)(H2,40,41,42)/t12?,13-,16-,17-,18+,22-/m1/s1 Key: MZFOKIKEPGUZEN-FBMOWMAEBZ
- SMILES: CC(C(=O)O)C(=O)SCCNC(=O)CCNC(=O)[C@@H](C(C)(C)COP(=O)(O)OP(=O)(O)OC[C@@H]1[C@H]([C@H]([C@@H](O1)N2C=NC3=C(N=CN=C32)N)O)OP(=O)(O)O)O

Properties
Chemical formula	C_{25}H_{40}N_{7}O_{19}P_{3}S
Molar mass	867.608 g/mol
- Except where otherwise noted, data are given for materials in their standard state (at 25 °C [77 °F], 100 kPa). verify (what is ?) Infobox references

Methylmalonyl-CoA is the thioester consisting of coenzyme A linked to methylmalonic acid. It is an important intermediate in the biosynthesis of succinyl-CoA, which plays an essential role in the citric acid cycle.

== Biosynthesis and metabolism ==
Propionate metabolic pathway with L- and D-methylmalonyl-CoA as intermediates.

Methylmalonyl-CoA can be synthesized in two ways:

- From propionyl-CoA: Methylmalonyl-CoA results from the metabolism of fatty acid with an odd number of carbons, of amino acids valine, isoleucine, methionine, threonine or of cholesterol side-chains, forming Propionyl-CoA. The latter is also formed from propionic acid, which bacteria produce in the intestine. Propionyl-CoA and bicarbonate are converted to Methylmalonyl-CoA by the enzyme propionyl-CoA Carboxylase. It then is converted into succinyl-CoA by methylmalonyl-CoA mutase (MUT). This reaction is a reversible isomerization. In this way, the compound enters the citric acid cycle. The following diagram demonstrates the aforementioned reaction:

Propionyl CoA + Bicarbonate → Methylmalonyl CoA → Succinyl CoA

- From methylmalonic acid: The mitochondrial enzyme acyl-CoA synthetase family member 3 (ACSF3) catalyzes the thioesterification of methylmalonic acid with coenzyme A (CoA) to form methylmalonyl-CoA.

== Vitamin B_{12} ==
Vitamin B_{12} plays an integral role in this reaction. Coenzyme B_{12} (adenosyl-cobalamin) is an organometallic form of vitamin B_{12} and serves as the cofactor of Methylmalonyl-CoA mutase, which is an essential enzyme in the human body. The transformation of Methylmalonyl-CoA to Succinyl-CoA by this enzyme is a radical reaction.

== Related diseases ==
=== Methylmalonic Acidemia (MMA) ===
This disease occurs when methylmalonyl-CoA mutase is unable to isomerize sufficient amounts of methylmalonyl-CoA into succinyl-CoA. This causes a buildup of propionic and/or methylmalonic acid, which has effects on infants ranging from severe brain damage to death. However, methylmalonyl-CoA also serves as the donor for lysine methylmalonylation, a pathogenic post-translational modification proposed to play a greater role in the disease than methylmalonic acid itself. The disease is linked to vitamin B_{12}, which is a cofactor for the enzyme methylmalonyl-CoA mutase.

=== Combined malonic and methylmalonic aciduria (CMAMMA) ===
In combined malonic and methylmalonic aciduria (CMAMMA), mutations in the ACSF3 gene impair the mitochondrial enzyme acyl-CoA synthetase family member 3 (ACSF3), disrupting the conversion of methylmalonic acid to methylmalonyl-CoA and its entry into the citric acid cycle. This leads to accumulation of methylmalonic acid, reduced methylmalonyl-CoA levels and decreased lysine methylmalonylation compared to healthy controls.
