= Succinyl-CoA =

Names
- IUPAC name 4-[(2-{3-[(2R)-4-{[1,3-Dihydroxy-1,3-dioxo-3-(3′-O-phosphonoadenosin-5′-O-yl)-1λ^{5},3λ^{5}-diphosphoxan-1-yl]oxy}-3,3-dimethylbutanamido]propanamido}ethyl)sulfanyl]-4-oxobutanoic acid
- Systematic IUPAC name (9R)-1-[(2R,3S,4R,5R)-5-(6-Amino-9H-purin-9-yl)-4-hydroxy-3-(phosphonooxy)oxolan-2-yl]-3,5,9-trihydroxy-8,8-dimethyl-3,5,10,14,19-pentaoxo-2,4,6-trioxa-18-thia-11,15-diaza-3λ^{5},5λ^{5}-diphosphadocosan-22-oic acid

Identifiers
CAS Number	604-98-8
3D model (JSmol)	Interactive image
ChEBI	CHEBI:15380
ChemSpider	83179
ECHA InfoCard	100.009.163
MeSH	succinyl-coenzyme+A
PubChem CID	92133
UNII	BSI27HW5EQ
CompTox Dashboard (EPA)	DTXSID40975809
- InChI: InChI=1S/C25H40N7O19P3S/c1-25(2,20(38)23(39)28-6-5-14(33)27-7-8-55-16(36)4-3-15(34)35)10-48-54(45,46)51-53(43,44)47-9-13-19(50-52(40,41)42)18(37)24(49-13)32-12-31-17-21(26)29-11-30-22(17)32/h11-13,18-20,24,37-38H,3-10H2,1-2H3,(H,27,33)(H,28,39)(H,34,35)(H,43,44)(H,45,46)(H2,26,29,30)(H2,40,41,42)/t13-,18-,19-,20+,24-/m1/s1 Key: VNOYUJKHFWYWIR-ITIYDSSPSA-N; InChI=1/C25H40N7O19P3S/c1-25(2,20(38)23(39)28-6-5-14(33)27-7-8-55-16(36)4-3-15(34)35)10-48-54(45,46)51-53(43,44)47-9-13-19(50-52(40,41)42)18(37)24(49-13)32-12-31-17-21(26)29-11-30-22(17)32/h11-13,18-20,24,37-38H,3-10H2,1-2H3,(H,27,33)(H,28,39)(H,34,35)(H,43,44)(H,45,46)(H2,26,29,30)(H2,40,41,42)/t13-,18-,19-,20+,24-/m1/s1 Key: VNOYUJKHFWYWIR-ITIYDSSPBJ
- SMILES: O=C(O)CCC(=O)SCCNC(=O)CCNC(=O)[C@H](O)C(C)(C)COP(=O)(O)OP(=O)(O)OC[C@H]3O[C@@H](n2cnc1c(ncnc12)N)[C@H](O)[C@@H]3OP(=O)(O)O

Properties
Chemical formula	C_{25}H_{40}N_{7}O_{19}P_{3}S
Molar mass	867.608
- Except where otherwise noted, data are given for materials in their standard state (at 25 °C [77 °F], 100 kPa). verify (what is ?) Infobox references

Succinyl-coenzyme A, abbreviated as succinyl-CoA (/ˌsʌksɪnəlˌkoʊˈeɪ/) or SucCoA, is a thioester of succinic acid and coenzyme A.

== Sources ==
It is an important intermediate in the citric acid cycle, where it is synthesized from α-ketoglutarate by α-ketoglutarate dehydrogenase through decarboxylation. During the process, coenzyme A is added.

With B12 as an enzymatic cofactor, it is also synthesized from propionyl CoA, the odd-numbered fatty acid, which cannot undergo beta-oxidation. Propionyl-CoA is carboxylated to D-methylmalonyl-CoA, isomerized to L-methylmalonyl-CoA, and rearranged to yield succinyl-CoA via a vitamin B_{12}-dependent enzyme. While succinyl-CoA is an intermediate of the citric acid cycle, it cannot be readily incorporated there because there is no net consumption of succinyl-CoA. Succinyl-CoA is first converted to malate, and then to pyruvate where it is then transported to the matrix to enter the citric acid cycle.

== Fate ==
It is converted into succinate through the hydrolytic release of coenzyme A by succinyl-CoA synthetase (succinate thiokinase).

Another fate of succinyl-CoA is porphyrin synthesis, where succinyl-CoA and glycine are combined by ALA synthase to form δ-aminolevulinic acid (dALA). This process is the committed step in the biosynthesis of porphobilinogen and thus hemoglobin.

== Formation ==
Succinyl CoA can be formed from methylmalonyl CoA through the utilization of deoxyadenosyl-B_{12} (deoxyadenosylcobalamin) by the enzyme methylmalonyl-CoA mutase. This reaction, which requires vitamin B_{12} as a cofactor, is important in the catabolism of some branched-chain amino acids as well as odd-chain fatty acids.

== Interactive pathway map ==
Click on genes, proteins and metabolites below to link to respective articles. (Note: The interactive pathway map can be edited at WikiPathways: "TCACycle_WP78".)

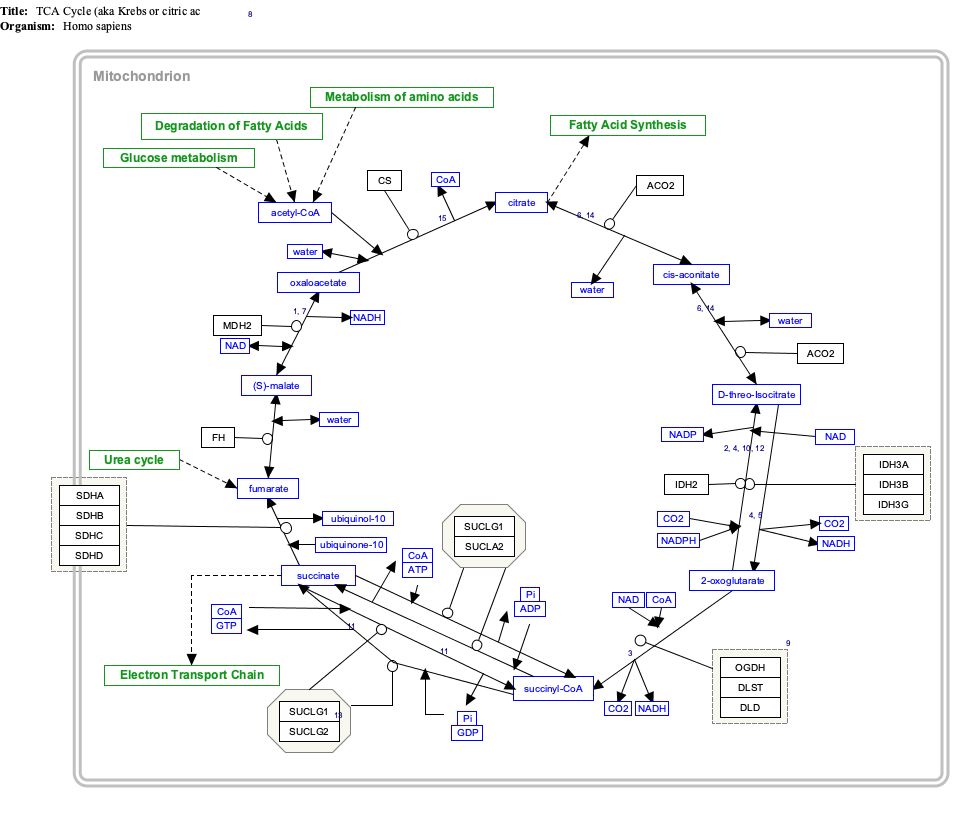

TCACycle_WP78 edit
