= Louis Woolf =

Louis Woolf may refer to:

- Louis Sydney Woolf (1855–1942), Australian cricketer
- Louis Isaac Woolf (1919–2021), British biochemist
