= Newborn Screening Saves Lives Reauthorization Act of 2013 =

Newborn Screening Saves Lives Reauthorization Act of 2014
- Long title: To amend the Public Health Service Act to reauthorize programs under part A of title XI of such Act.
- Announced in: the 113th United States Congress
- Sponsored by: Rep. Lucille Roybal-Allard (D, CA-40)
- Number of co-sponsors: 1

Codification
- Acts affected: Public Health Service Act, Federal Advisory Committee Act, Newborn Screening Saves Lives Act of 2008
- U.S.C. sections affected: 42 U.S.C. § 300b–15, 42 U.S.C. § 300b–14, 5 U.S.C.
- Agencies affected: Department of Health and Human Services, Health Resources and Services Administration, Indian Health Service, Executive Office of the President, Centers for Disease Control and Prevention, Food and Drug Administration, Agency for Healthcare Research and Quality
- Authorizations of appropriations: $25,834,000 for each of fiscal years 2014, 2015, 2016, 2017 and 2018, for a total of $129,170,000

Legislative history
- Introduced in the House as H.R. 1281 by Rep. Lucille Roybal-Allard (D, CA-40) on March 20, 2013; Committee consideration by United States House Committee on Energy and Commerce, United States House Energy Subcommittee on Health

The Newborn Screening Saves Lives Reauthorization Act of 2014 (H.R. 1281) is a bill that would amend the Public Health Service Act to reauthorize grant programs and other initiatives to promote expanded screening of newborns and children for heritable disorders.

The bill was introduced into the United States House of Representatives during the 113th United States Congress. A companion bill, S. 1417, was introduced into the United States Senate.

There is no record in this article that the proposed bill ever became US Federal statutory law.

== Background ==
Newborn screening programs test for a number of different conditions using a number of different laboratorial methodologies. There is also bedside testing for hearing loss using evoked auditory potentials and congenital heart defects using pulse oximetry. Newborn screening started out using simple bacterial inhibition assays to screen for a single disorder, starting with phenylketonuria in the early 1960s. With this testing methodology, newborn screening required one test to detect one condition. As mass spectrometry became more widely available, the technology allowed rapid determination of a number of acylcarnitines and amino acids from a single dried blood spot. This increased the number of conditions that could be detected by newborn screening. Enzyme assays are used to screen for galactosemia and biotinidase deficiency. Immunoassays measure thyroid hormones for the diagnosis of congenital hypothyroidism and 17α-hydroxyprogesterone for the diagnosis of congenital adrenal hyperplasia. Molecular techniques are used for the diagnosis of cystic fibrosis and severe combined immunodeficiency.

The first newborn screening law, the Newborn Screening Saves Lives Act of 2007 (Pub. L. 110–204 (text) (PDF)), was passed in 2008. The law established national standards for newborn screenings.

== Provisions of the bill ==
This summary is based largely on the summary provided by the Congressional Research Service, a public domain source.

The Newborn Screening Saves Lives Reauthorization Act of 2014 would amend the Public Health Service Act to extend and revise a grant program for screening, counseling, and other services related to heritable disorders. The bill would expand eligible grantees to include a health professional organization and an early childhood health system.

The bill would extend a grant program to evaluate the effectiveness of screening, counseling, or health care services in reducing the morbidity and mortality caused by heritable disorders in newborns and children. Expands the program to include evaluation of treatment and follow-up care for newborns and their families after screening and diagnosis.

The bill would extend for five years the operation of the Advisory Committee on Heritable Disorders in Newborns and Children. Authorizes the United States Secretary of Health and Human Services (HHS) to continue the Advisory Committee after such time. Requires the Advisory Committee to meet in person at least twice each year.

The bill would extend the clearinghouse for newborn screening information. Expands the duties of the clearinghouse to include: (1) maintaining current data on the number of conditions for which screening is conducted in each state; and (2) establishing or disseminating guidelines for services and personnel necessary for follow-up, diagnosis, counseling, and treatment of to conditions detected by newborn screening.

The bill would extend requirements for the Secretary to provide for quality assurance of laboratories involved in screening newborns and children for heritable disorders.

The bill would extend the Interagency Coordinating Committee on Newborn and Child Screening.

The bill would authorize the Secretary to have the Hunter Kelly Newborn Screening Research Program to: (1) provide research and data for newborn conditions under review by the Advisory Committee to be added to the Recommended Uniform Screening Panel; and (2) conduct pilot studies on conditions recommended by the Advisory Committee to ensure that screenings are ready for nationwide implementation.

The bill would direct the Secretary, acting through the Director of the Centers for Disease Control and Prevention (CDC), to award grants to, or enter into cooperative agreements with, eligible entities to develop longitudinal follow-up and tracking programs for newborn screening.

== Congressional Budget Office report ==
This summary is based largely on the summary provided by the Congressional Budget Office, as ordered reported by the House Committee on Energy and Commerce on April 3, 2014. This is a public domain source.

H.R. 1281 would amend the Public Health Service Act to reauthorize grant programs and other initiatives to promote expanded screening of newborns and children for heritable disorders. Authority to operate those programs expired at the end of fiscal year 2013. However, the Congress appropriated funds for fiscal year 2014 to continue the programs in 2014.

The Congressional Budget Office (CBO) estimates that implementing H.R. 1281 would cost $80 million over the 2015-2019 period, assuming appropriation of the necessary amounts. H.R. 1281 would not affect direct spending or revenues; therefore, pay-as-you-go procedures do not apply.

H.R. 1281 contains no intergovernmental or private-sector mandates as defined in the Unfunded Mandates Reform Act and would impose no costs on state, local, or tribal governments.

== Procedural history ==
The Newborn Screening Saves Lives Reauthorization Act of 2014 was introduced into the United States House of Representatives on March 20, 2013, by Rep. Lucille Roybal-Allard (D, CA-40). The bill was referred to the United States House Committee on Energy and Commerce and the United States House Energy Subcommittee on Health. The bill was reported (amended) on June 19, 2014, alongside House Report 113-478.

== Debate and discussion ==
The March of Dimes encouraged its supporters to "tell Congress that you support" the bill. The March of Dimes described the bill as reauthorizing "critical federal activities that assist states in improving and expanding their newborn screening programs, supporting parents and provider newborns screening education, and ensuring laboratory quality and surveillance."

The Muscular Dystrophy Association (MDA) supported the bill, arguing that "many of the drug therapies currently under development for MDA's community will be of most benefit if administered either presymptomatically or early in the progression of the disease. Thus, for some of the diseases in MDA's program, the availability of a newborn screening program at the time of treatment availability presents the best opportunity for impacting optimal and potential lifesaving treatment outcomes."

Rep. Roybal-Allard, who introduced the bill, argued that "newborn screening not only transforms and save lives - it saves money." According to Roybal-Allard, in California "newborns are screened for more than 40 preventable and treatable conditions – and for every one dollar California spends on screening, it yields a benefit of over $9 as we prevent disease in children who are diagnosed with these treatable conditions."

Rep. Mike Simpson (R-ID), who cosponsored the bill, said that "the bill reflects the realities of reduced budgets Washington, but continues and strengthens the well established system of monitoring and evaluating infant conditions soon after birth. Just one small blood sample from the newborn’s foot identifies infants with genetic or other conditions that can be treated quickly and effectively, saving and improving thousands of lives."

The National Association of Neonatal Nurses also supported the bill.

== See also ==
- List of bills in the 113th United States Congress
- Newborn screening
- Newborn Screening Saves Lives Act of 2007
- List of disorders included in newborn screening programs
