= Newborn Screening Saves Lives Act of 2007 =

US law

- Long title: An act to spearhead the creation of federal guidelines on newborn screening.
- Acronyms (colloquial): NBSSLA
- Enacted by: the 110th United States Congress
- Effective: April 24, 2008

Citations
- Public law: 110-204
- Statutes at Large: 122 Stat. 705, 706, 707, 708, 709, 710, 711 and 712.

Codification
- Acts amended: Public Health Service Act
- Titles amended: 42
- U.S.C. sections amended: 42 U.S.C. 300b 42 U.S.C. 300b-10 42 U.S.C. 300b-8 42 U.S.C. 300b-9

Legislative history
- Introduced in the Senate as S.1858 by Senator Chris Dodd (D-CT) on July 23, 2007; Committee consideration by Senate Health, Education, Labor, and Pensions, Energy and Commerce, and Subcommittee on Health; Passed the Senate on December 13, 2007 (Unanimous Consent); Passed the House on April 8, 2008 (Voice Vote); Signed into law by President George W. Bush on April 24, 2008

President George W. Bush signed the Newborn Screening Saves Lives Act of 2007 (Pub.L.110-204) (NBSSLA) into law on April 24, 2008, a day before DNA Day. The Act amended the Public Health Service Act to establish grant programs concerning newborn screening education and outreach, as parents are often unaware that newborn screening takes place and the number and types of screening varies across states. It also established grant programs to coordinate follow-up care, after newborn screening is conducted. The legislation also reauthorized programs under part A of title XI of the Public Health Service Act. In his introductory remarks, Senator Chris Dodd stated that the legislation "protect[s] the most vulnerable members of our society: newborn infants." Newborn Screening is a proven life saving and effective public health tool used to identify thousands of babies in the U.S. born with genetic, metabolic, and congenital conditions. At the time of the legislation's passage, only 15 States along with the District of Columbia required newborns to be screened for 29 core conditions as recommended by the Health Resources and Services Administration/American College of Medical Genetics' 2004 Report.

== Legislative history ==
This bill, S. 1858, was a bipartisan bill sponsored by Sen. Chris Dodd, Sen. Orrin Hatch, and Sen. Hillary Clinton. It passed the U.S. Senate by unanimous consent on December 13, 2007. The bill passed the House of Representatives of the United States by Voice Vote on April 8, 2008. President George W. Bush signed the bill into law 16 days later. This legislation was first introduced as the Newborn Screening Saves Lives Act of 2002 in the second section of the 107th United States Congress. Senator Chris Dodd (D-CT) and Representative Lucille Roybal-Allard sponsored the bill in the U.S. Senate and House of Representatives of the United States, respectively. Like most new legislation, S. 2890 and H.R. 4493 garnered minimal support and received no further action after being referred to the Senate Committee on Health, Education, Labor, and Pensions, and the House Subcommittee on Health.

The Newborn Screening Saves Lives Act was again introduced in subsequent sessions of Congress. The bills were introduced as S. 1068 and H.R. 4493 in the 108th United States Congress, S. 2663 and H.R. 5397 in the 109th United States Congress, and S. 1634 and H.R. 1634 in the first session of the 110th United States Congress. During the 110th United States Congress, the Newborn Screening Saves Act was reintroduced as S. 1858 after S. 1634 was combined with the competing legislation, the Screening for Health of Infants and Newborn Act [S. 1712] sponsored by Senator Hillary Clinton (D-NY). With this merge, Senator Chris Dodd (D-CT), Senator Hillary Clinton (D-NY), Senator Orrin Hatch (R-UT), and Senator Edward Kennedy (D-MA) led the way on this bill, which became the Newborn Screening Saves Lives Act that was ultimately passed and signed into law. The companion bill was H.R. 3825.

== Provisions ==
The Newborn Screen Saves Lives Act (NBSSLA) expanded the authorizations and duties of the Health Resources and Services Administration in dealing with newborn screening. This legislation has allowed HRSA to spearhead the creation of federal recommendations on newborn screening, and assists State programs in meeting these requirements. It also facilitates the establishment of grant programs to support education and outreach initiatives to increase adoption and knowledge of newborn screening. Furthermore, it gives HRSA the power to establish, maintain, and operate a system designed to evaluate and manage treatments concerning congenital, genetic, and metabolic disorders.

On April 24, 2008, programs and activities were expanded by the "Newborn Screening Saves Lives Act of 2008" to facilitate the creation of Federal guidelines on newborn screening, assist State newborn screening programs in meeting federal guidelines, and establish grant programs to provide for education and outreach on newborn screening, and implement coordinated follow-up care once newborn screening has been conducted.

=== Section 2 ===
Improved Newborn and Child Screening for Heritable Disorders

Amended Section 1109 of the Public Health Service Act to improve the screening for heritable disorders in newborn and children at the State and local level by authorizing grants to expand, enhance, or improve training of professionals on newborn screening and other related technologies, informed parents and advocacy support groups on NBS, and established a system to coordinate follow-up care. Funding is provided to only agencies or organizations who have adopted and implemented (or in the process of adopting) the Secretary Advisory Committee on Heritable Disorders in Newborns and Children's federal guidelines as adopted by the HHS Secretary. The HRSA created seven Regional Genetic and Newborn Screening Service Collaboratives and a National Coordinating Center for the Collaborative have responsibilities to aid in fulfilling the legislative mandate of improving or expanding NBS programs.

=== Section 3 ===
Evaluating the Effectiveness of Newborn and Child Screening Programs

Amended section 1110 of PHSA authorized funding for evaluating the effectiveness of Newborn and Child screening programs in reducing complications caused by heritable disorders.

=== Section 4 ===
Advisory Committee on heritable Disorders in Newborns and Children

Expands the mandate of the Advisory Committee on Heritable Disorders in Newborns and Children to incorporate making recommendations for screening certain disorders, developing a system to adjudicate newborn screening expansion, and assist states in implementing programs to test for the recommended conditions.

Amended section 1111 of the PHSA to reauthorize and expanded the role of the Secretary's Advisory Committee on Heritable Disorders in Newborns and Children (SACHDNC). It also included the requirement to develop a model decision-matrix for NBS expansion.

=== Section 5 ===
Information Clearinghouse

Added section 1112 to the PHSA to provide the legislative authority for establishing and maintaining a web accessible central clearinghouse of resources pertaining to newborn screening. This includes educational materials, information on family support and services, and research and data on newborn screening. The HRSA Maternal and Child Health Bureau awarded Genetic Alliance a cooperative agreement to develop this clearinghouse in 2009. Genetic Alliance launched BabysFirstTest.org as the nation's first clearinghouse in September 2011. As outlined within NBSSLA, Baby's First Test serves three purposes: 1.) Increases awareness, knowledge, and understanding of all stakeholders, including industry representatives and the broader public 2.) Increases awareness, knowledge, and understanding of NBS services and diseases that are screened, and 3.) Links the National Newborn Screening Information System's public site, which contains newborn screening performance database on quality indicators.

=== Section 6 ===
Laboratory Quality and Surveillance

Added section 1113 of the PHSA to authorize the Centers for Disease Control and Prevention (CDC) to work with the SACHDNC to provide for quality assurance for State laboratories, and quality control to evaluate the performance of the new screening tools and services.

Added section 1114 of the PHSA to require the Health and Human Services Secretary to establish an Interagency Coordinating Committee (ICC) on newborn screening to make recommendations on various programs. They are to advise the government in designing programs to collect, analyze, and make available data on certain heritable disorders and establish regional centers to conduct epidemiological research on preventing complications from such disorders.

According to the legislation, the ICC is composed of a HRSA Administrator, CDC Director, NIH Director, and AHRQ Director. Currently, the ICC is charged with coordinating the newborn and child screening collaborating efforts across all the agencies under the Department of Health and Human Services. It also has responsibility to identify policy issues that require attention or action by federal agencies pertaining to heritable disorders in newborns and children.

=== Section 7 ===
Contingency Planning

Added section 1115 of the PHSA that called for the development of newborn screening contingency planning in the event of a public health emergency. The Centers for Disease Control took the lead in developing this plan in consultation with HRSA and State Health departments. More specifically, it requires the CDC to develop a national contingency plan for newborn screening to prepare for a possible public health emergency.

Added section 1116 of the public health service act to establish the Hunter Kelly Research Program. This program is intended to identify, develop, and test the most advance and promising new screening technologies with the goal of improving and expanding the number of conditions included in newborn screening.

== Opposition ==
While this legislation has received strong support from the medical community, and patient advocacy groups, there has been continued opposition to its mandates. Most notably, the Citizen's Council on Health Freedom strongly opposed the passage of NBSSLA over privacy concerns. Twila Brase, the president of the Minnesota based activist group, voiced concerns over the storage of bloodspots, and is a strong proponent of having all bio-banks destroyed. Brase cited concerns over "government-sponsored genetic research." It is worth noting that states have been storing samples since the 1960s when NBS was first implemented, and each state has its own policy on DBS storage and research. As of 2008, California has stored over 12,000 samples since 1980, while Texas destroys the samples within months. Privacy advocacy groups voiced concerns on the potential abuse of these samples in both medical and forensic uses. Some have cited the sharing of genetic information with the Department of Homeland Security. However, past practices and clear policies on use and limitations indicate that there is a distinct separation between medical and forensic use. State laboratories have been known to turn down requests from law enforcement to access NBS data and samples, even in cases for the identification of missing children.

== Status ==
The legislation has allowed newborn screening to be enhanced and expanded, and has also established federal guidelines for conditions all newborns should be screened for. Additionally, it has created a comprehensive, public-facing, educational repository on newborn screening in the form of Baby's First Test. This funding has increased the awareness among parents and health professionals. Since the passage of NBSSLA, the Secretary Advisory Committee on Heritable Disorders in Newborns and Children has added Severe Combined Immunodeficiences (SCID) and Critical Congenital Heart Disease (CCHD) to the Recommended Uniform Screening Panel (RUSP).

NBSSLA funding was also key to enhancing programs within the Regional Genetic and Newborn Screening Service Collaboratives, along with the National Coordinating Center for the Collaborative. By November 30, 2010, every state and territory had the ability to enter positively screened newborns into their clinical management systems. This outcome is a 7% improvement from the 93% figure from December 2008 when the evaluation first occurred.

The Newborn Screening Saves Lives Reauthorization Act of 2013 (H.R. 1281; 113th Congress) was introduced into the House of Representatives in 2013 in order to reauthorize this bill.
