= Β-2-Thienylalanine =

β-2-Thienylalanine

Names
- Systematic IUPAC name 2-Amino-3-(thiophen-2-yl)propanoic acid

Identifiers
CAS Number	139-86-6
3D model (JSmol)	Interactive image
ChemSpider	82573
ECHA InfoCard	100.004.890
EC Number	217-967-1
MeSH	C047942
PubChem CID	91444
UNII	6ZK0RDK1XB
CompTox Dashboard (EPA)	DTXSID10862813
- InChI: InChI=1S/C7H9NO2S/c8-6(7(9)10)4-5-2-1-3-11-5/h1-3,6H,4,8H2,(H,9,10) Key: WTOFYLAWDLQMBZ-UHFFFAOYSA-N; InChI=1/C7H9NO2S/c8-6(7(9)10)4-5-2-1-3-11-5/h1-3,6H,4,8H2,(H,9,10) Key: WTOFYLAWDLQMBZ-UHFFFAOYAS
- SMILES: c1cc(sc1)CC(C(=O)O)N

Properties
Chemical formula	C_{7}H_{9}NO_{2}S
Molar mass	171.21 g·mol^{−1}
- Except where otherwise noted, data are given for materials in their standard state (at 25 °C [77 °F], 100 kPa). verify (what is ?) Infobox references

β-2-Thienylalanine is an amino acid containing a thiophene side chain. It is a phenylalanine antagonist used in the Guthrie test.
