= Evelyn Hickmans =

British chemist

- Born: 9 April 1882; Wolverhampton
- Died: 16 January 1972 (aged 89); Wolverhampton
- Education: Birmingham University; King’s College, London
- Known for: Treatment of phenylketonuria
- Awards: John Scott Medal
- Scientific career
- Fields: Biochemistry
- Institutions: University of Toronto, Birmingham Children's Hospital
- Academic advisors: Leonard Parsons

Evelyn Marion Hickmans (9 April 1882 – 16 January 1972) was an English biochemist, and a pioneer in developing a treatment for phenylketonuria together with Horst Bickel and John Gerrard. She worked at the Birmingham Children's Hospital. She was an author and co-author of publications about blood chemistry and childhood diseases.

== Early life and education ==
Evelyn Marion Hickmans was born in 1882 in Wolverhampton. She attended Birmingham University, graduating with a Bachelor of Science in 1905, and a Master of Science in 1906. She moved to London University, where she studied dietetics and household science, and then helped establish a similar course in Toronto.

== Professional career ==
In 1923 Hickmans joined her cousin, paediatrician Dr Leonard Parsons, at Birmingham Children's Hospital, where she spent the rest of her career. One of the first biochemists appointed in Birmingham. Parsons was first Lecturer in the Diseases of Childhood appointed to Birmingham Medical School, later appointed the School's first chair in paediatrics (1928). Hickman and Parsons collaborated to research nutritional problems such as marasmus, coeliac disease, vitamin deficiencies, anaemia, cystinosis and aminoaciduria. Hickman developed investigative techniques around microanalysis and paper chromatography. She earned another MSc at Birmingham, in biochemistry, and then in 1925 completed a doctorate in physiology. She retired in 1953 but continued to train others.

Hickman and Parsons's work on fat absorption in cases of coeliac syndromes, would be further clarified by work undertaken by Parson's successor, Professor J. M. Smellie and a team that would include John Gerrard and Charlotte Anderson. Hickmans came to notice when she, Horst Bickel and John Gerrard were persuaded by a persistent mother to help her daughter who was suffering from phenylketonuria. They created a diet that was low in phenylalanine and the daughter's condition improved. Hickmans worked to show how such infant foods could be manufactured commercially. The work was pioneering, and began a worldwide research field into dietary prevention of mental disorders.

In 1962, Hickmans and her team were awarded the John Scott Medal for their invention of a method for controlling phenylketonuria.

Hickmans died in Wolverhampton on 16 January 1972, aged 89.
