= Neonatal heel prick =

Blood collection procedure for newborns

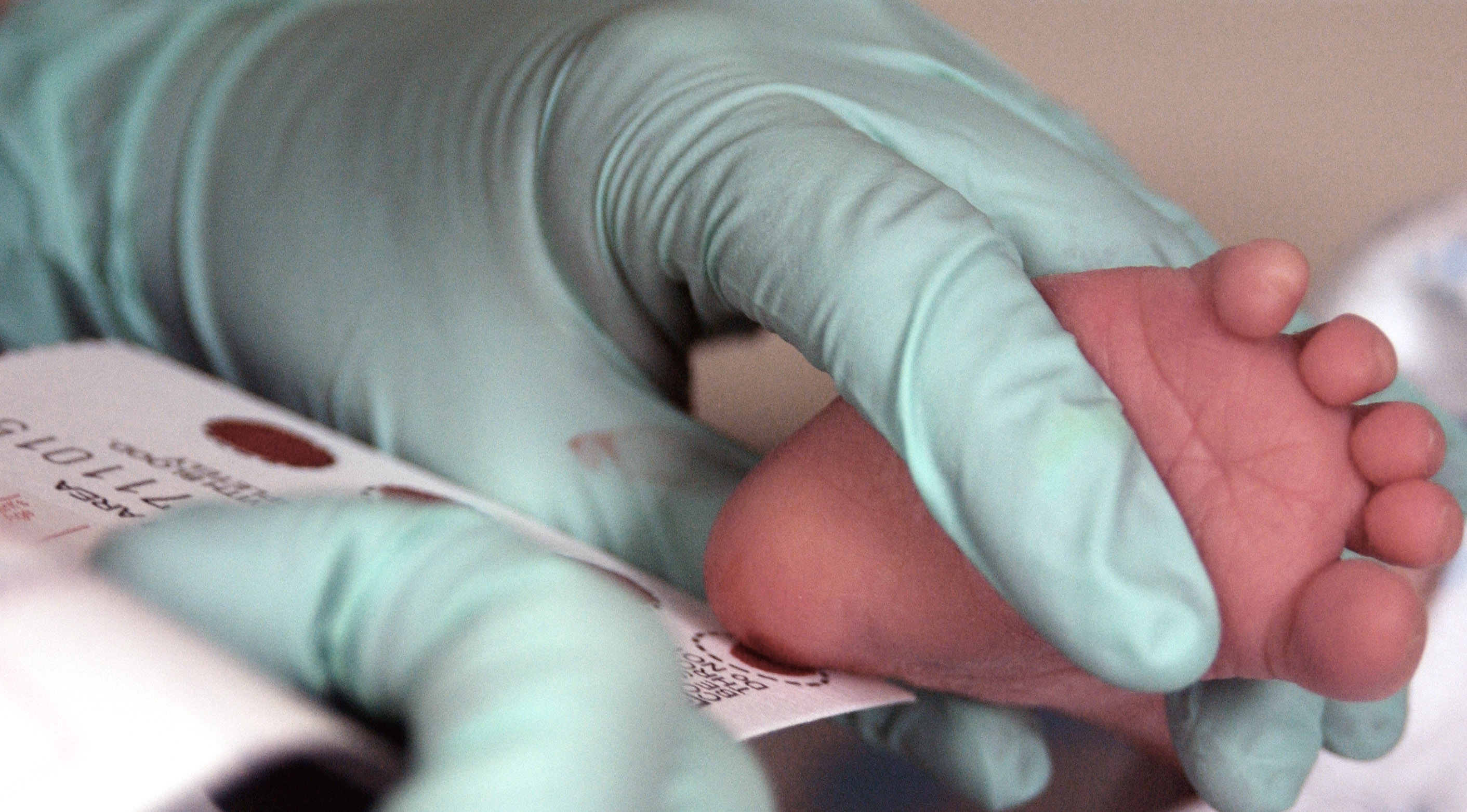
The blood of a two-week-old infant is collected for a phenylketonuria, or PKU, screening

The neonatal heel prick is a blood-collection procedure done on newborns. It consists of making a pinprick puncture in one heel of newborns to collect their blood. This technique is used frequently as the main way to collect blood from neonates. Other techniques include venous or arterial needle sticks, cord blood sampling, or umbilical line collection. This technique is often used for the Guthrie test, where it is used to soak the blood into printed collection cards known as Guthrie cards.

The classical Guthrie test is named after Robert Guthrie, an American bacteriologist and physician who devised it in 1962. The test has been widely used in North America and Europe as one of the core newborn screening tests since the late 1960s. The test was initially a bacterial inhibition assay, but is gradually being replaced in many areas by newer techniques such as tandem mass spectrometry that can detect a wider variety of congenital diseases.

== Detected diseases ==
The blood samples can be used for a variety of metabolic tests to detect genetic conditions, including:

- Immunoreactive trypsinogen to detect cystic fibrosis
- Maple syrup urine disease (or branched-chain ketonuria) is a rare disorder where an error in metabolism inhibits the breakdown of the amino acids leucine, isoleucine, and valine. It can impair brain development.
- Medium-chain acyl-coenzyme A dehydrogenase deficiency
- Phenylketonuria (PKU) is a disorder where an error in amino acid metabolism can impair brain development.
- Sickle-cell disease
- Thyroid stimulating hormone or thyroxin is used to detect congenital hypothyroidism and hence prevent cretinism.
- Isovaleric acidemia
- Homocystinuria (pyridoxine unresponsive)
- 17-hydroxy-progesterone to detect adrenogenital syndrome, also known as congenital adrenal hyperplasia
- Galactosemia

== Mechanism ==
The test uses the growth of a strain of bacteria on a specially prepared agar plate as a sign for the presence of high levels of phenylalanine, phenylpyruvate, and/or phenyl lactate. The compound B-2-thienylalanine inhibits the growth of the bacterium Bacillus subtilis (ATCC 6051) on minimal culture media. If phenylalanine, phenylpyruvate, and/or phenyl lactate is added to the medium, then growth is restored. Such compounds will be present in excess in the blood or urine of patients with PKU. If a suitably prepared sample of blood or urine is applied to the seeded agar plate, the growth of the bacteria in the test is a positive indicator for PKU in the patient.

To prepare the sample for application, a small amount of blood (from a heel puncture, for example) or urine (from a diaper, for example) is applied to a piece of filter paper. Then, a small disc is punched from the center of the spot of blood or urine, and the disc is applied to the surface of a seeded, minimal-medium agar plate that contains added beta-2-thienylalanine. If the sample contains phenylalanine, phenylpyruvate, and/or phenyl lactate, then these compounds will diffuse into the agar medium. If their concentrations are high enough (as with the excess levels seen with PKU), bacteria will grow under the disc, but not elsewhere. Generally, an overnight incubation is enough to determine whether phenylalanine, phenylpyruvate, or phenyl lactate is present in unusual concentrations in blood or urine.

== Timing ==
The blood spot sample should be taken between 48 and 72 hours of age for all babies regardless of medical condition, milk feeding, and prematurity. For the purpose of screening, date of birth is day 0 (some IT systems record date of birth as day 1). False positives and false negatives can sometimes occur when the screening tests are performed before 48 hours.

When the immunoassay method is used as a screening method for quantifying 17α-hydroxyprogesterone (17OHP) in dried blood spots, it exhibits a significant rate of false positive results. As per the clinical practice guideline issued by the Endocrine Society in 2018, employing LC-MS/MS to measure 17OHP and other adrenal steroid hormones (such as 21-deoxycortisol and androstenedione) is recommended as a supplementary screening approach to enhance the accuracy of positive predictions.

With genetic tests becoming more common, a wide variety of tests may use the blood drawn by this method. Many neonatal units now use this method to carry out the daily blood tests (blood count, electrolytes) required to check the progress of ill neonates.

== Data retention controversy ==
In Ireland, a controversy emerged in 2012 whereby a number of hospitals retained heel-prick test cards and thereby a DNA database with over a million samples from 1984, without parental consent or notification. This resulted in the introduction of a 10-year rolling destruction cycle. Similar practices exist in the United Kingdom, New Zealand, and several states of the United States.

== Heel-stick wound ==
Heel-stick wounds are a cutaneous condition characterized by a break in the skin caused by neonatal heel prick. The heel stick is an important medical screening for the child and causes low levels of pain.

== See also ==
- Dried blood spot testing
- Hyperphenylalaninemia
- Newborn screening
