= Dried blood spot =

Blood sampling technique

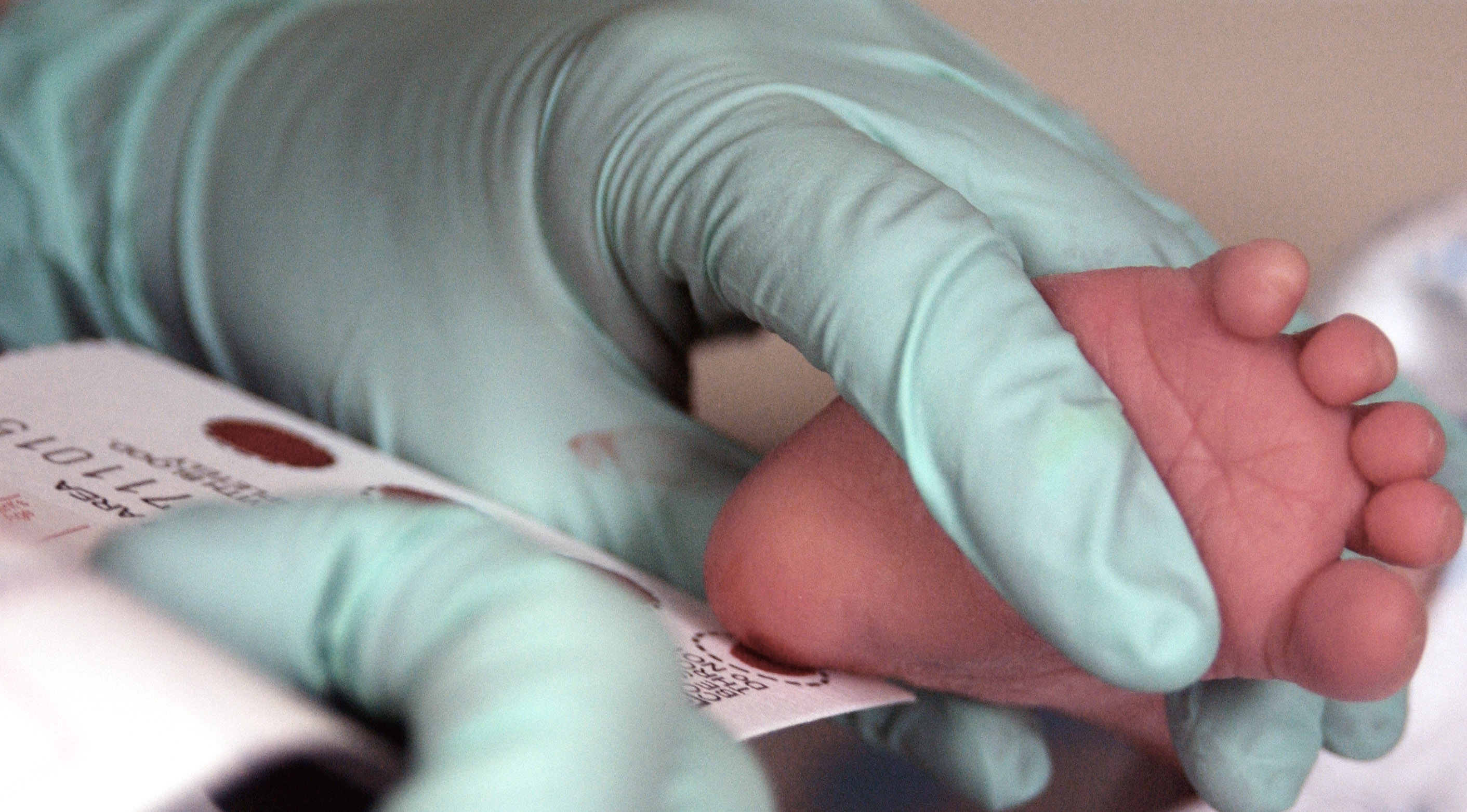
The blood of a two week-old infant is collected for a Phenylketonuria, or PKU, screening

Dried blood spot testing (DBS) is a form of biosampling where blood samples are blotted and dried on filter paper. The dried samples can easily be shipped to an analytical laboratory and analysed using various methods such as DNA amplification or high-performance liquid chromatography.

== History ==
Ivar Bang first described the DBS as an unusual sampling method in 1913. The concept that capillary blood, obtained from pricking the heel or finger and blotted onto filter paper, could be used to screen for metabolic diseases in large populations of neonates was introduced in Scotland by Robert Guthrie in 1963. Neonatal screening for phenylketonuria became nationwide in 1969–70. Since then, Guthrie card samples have been collected routinely from infants in over 20 countries to screen for phenylketonuria and more recently for congenital hypothyroidism, sickle cell disorders and HIV infection. The limitations of sensitivity and specificity when screening such small volumes of blood restricted the use of dried blood spots for many years. However, recent advances such as the production of monoclonal antibodies, expression of synthetic proteins, and the introduction of the polymerase chain reaction have overcome many of these problems.

This type of blood testing is now available for use at home by consumers in the U.S. Available blood tests include vitamin D, estrogen, testosterone, cortisol, TSH and lipids. New York is the only state that prohibits home blood spot testing.

== Historical applications ==
By 2001, over 175 analytes had been measured using DBS, ranging from acylcarnitines and C-reactive protein to cyclosporine A, cytokines, hepatitis B virus, glucose, and antibodies for over 30 viruses and microorganisms. Other analytes included gentamicin, lipoproteins, prolactin, selenium, trace elements, vitamin A, and zinc protoporphyrin were also measured.

In the 20th century, the use of blood and serum collected and dried on a filter paper for serologic testing for syphilis was already reported. Both field and home sample collections were described.

The first report of blood absorbed onto filter paper for enzyme measurements was published in 1953.

In 1962, Berry explored the use of filter paper urine samples for population-based screening programs.

In 1980, an immunochemical test for colorectal cancer screening using fecal occult blood smears on specially treated filter paper was introduced.

In 1987, successful extraction of DNA from blood collected on “blotter” paper and dried was first reported by McCabe.

The United States can serve as one of the best examples of a widespread usage of DBS. There, DBS is a part nationally-coordinated effort (controlled by the American Center for Disease Control and Prevention) for newborn screening. This programme, named Newborn Screening Quality Assurance Program (NSQAP), ensures that newborns routinely undergo screening tests to detect those with diseases that need an increased medical attention. The NSQAP is based on dried blood spots sampling, where the blood is collected from the newborn's heel.

== Procedure ==
Dried blood spot specimens are collected by applying a few drops of capillary blood, drawn by lancet from the finger, heel or toe, onto specially manufactured absorbent filter paper. The blood is allowed to thoroughly saturate the paper. It is air dried for several hours. Specimens are stored in low gas-permeability plastic bags with desiccant added to reduce humidity, and may be kept at ambient temperature, even in tropical climates.

Once in the laboratory, technicians separate a small disc of saturated paper from the sheet using an automated or manual hole punch, dropping the disc into a flat bottomed microtitre plate. The blood is eluted out in phosphate buffered saline containing 0.05% Tween 80 and 0.005% sodium azide, overnight at 4 °C. The resultant plate containing the eluates forms the "master" from which dilutions can be made for subsequent testing.

As an alternative to punching out a paper disc, recent automation solutions extract the sample by flushing an eluent through the filter without punching it out. An automation including the application of an internal standard prior extraction was developed by the Swiss company CAMAG.

== Dried blood spot testing for HIV infection ==
The technology aims to improve diagnostic services to HIV-infected infants and patients, starting treatment, and suppressing the virus from replicating. It is ideal in resource-poor settings due to the samples' longer lifespan with reduced need for refrigeration and the less invasive nature of the test compared with other methods. Unlike ELISA testing for HIV-antibodies in the blood, which may be transmitted to infants in pregnancy independently of the virus itself, dried blood spot testing can be used to detect the genetic material of the actual virus, thereby avoiding the likelihood of a false positive result. DBS specimens also pose less of a biohazard risk to handlers, and are easier to transport or store than liquid blood specimens. Results from DBS correlate with traditional plasma testing, the standard sample. This technology is available in countries with high HIV prevalence, made possible by collaborating with different health organisations and national governments.

== Principle ==
The reason for the stability of DNA, RNA or protein could be attributed to the fact that the biological material binds to the matrix of the filter paper and the process of drying excludes water which is an important factor necessary for protease or nuclease to act. Binding of the biological material also binds several inhibitors which may interfere with various nucleic acid amplification methods.

== Advantages ==
DBS has important characteristics that make it suitable for current and future applications. It presents minimal potential risk of bacterial contamination and/or hemolysis. It is an easy, non-invasive and economical collection method. DBS samples can be stored for extended periods with almost no deterioration of the analytes, and they require less blood compared to conventional venipuncture. It is the ideal method for remote or at home sampling, especially useful in rural areas.

== Disadvantages ==
However, there are some concerns associated with DBS biosampling. These include challenges related to sample volume, analyte recovery, the hematocrit effect, sample homogeneity, and the characteristics of the filter paper used.

== Dried plasma spot ==
This technology is similar to dried blood spot sampling however instead of collecting whole blood on a membrane, it separates red blood cells from plasma. A dried plasma spot (DPS) is usually a drop of capillary blood on a plasma separation card, the first membrane will filter all the red blood cells, while the second membrane aborbs the cell free plasma. This method is ideal for processing and storage of plasma.

== See also ==
- Polymerase chain reaction
- High-performance liquid chromatography
