= Louis Isaac Woolf =

British biochemist (1919–2021)

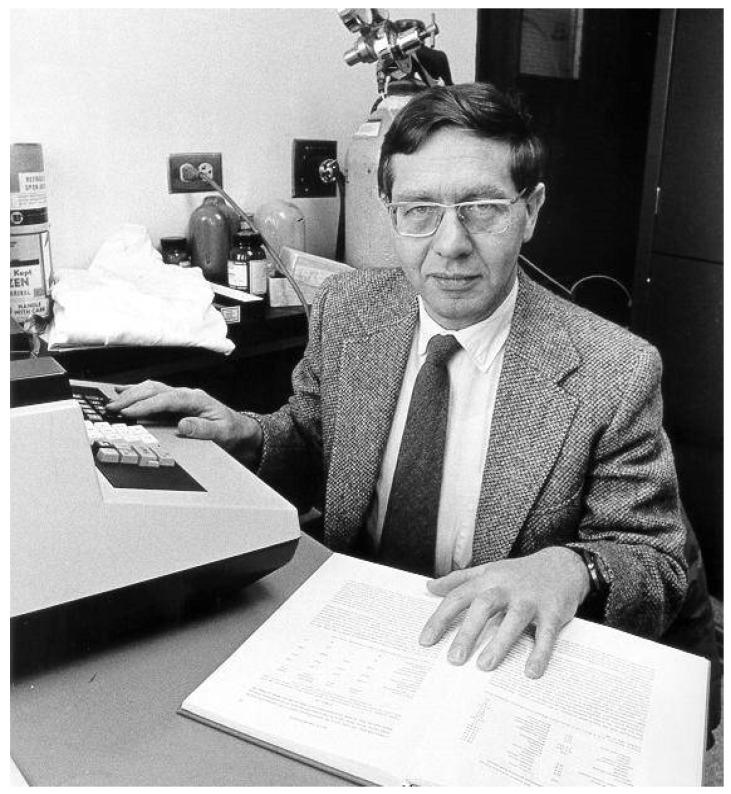
- Woolf in 1972 (image from the University of British Columbia Archive)
- Born: 24 April 1919; Hackney, London
- Died: 2021 aged 101; Vancouver, Canada
- Education: University College London (Ph.D. 1945)
- Known for: Work on inherited metabolic disorders, with a focus on amino acids
- Scientific career
- Workplaces: Hospital for Sick Children, London; University of British Columbia, Vancouver

Louis Isaac Woolf (born 1919 in London, England; died 2021 in Vancouver, Canada) was a British biochemist who played a crucial role in the early detection (via neonatal screening) and the treatment of phenylketonuria (PKU).

== Early life ==
Woolf was born in London, England, on 24 April 1919. He was born in Hackney, London to a Romanian Jewish family. He had 4 siblings.

== Career ==
He studied chemistry at University College London (UCL) and was awarded a PhD in 1945. In 1947, he was awarded an Imperial Chemical Industries (ICI) research fellowship at the Hospital for Sick Children at Great Ormond Street, London, working on tyrosine metabolism in premature babies and inherited metabolic disorders, with a focus on amino acids.

Woolf believed that the metabolic disorder phenylketonuria (PKU) could be treated through dietary changes, most notably a low-phenylalanine diet. At the time, the scientific consensus was that PKU was untreatable. However, the idea that it could be treated through diet was proposed by some doctors since the 1930s, shortly after the condition was first described. However, this was not easy as scientists struggled to reduce the levels of phenylalanine in food. Woolf's idea of using activated charcoal to filter phenylalanine from casein hydrolysate laid the groundwork for future dietary interventions, which he researched in the late 1940s and early 1950s.

The first successful trial of this diet involved proposing a low-phenylalanine diet as a treatment for PKU. This was done in collaboration with Horst Bickel, John W. Gerrard and other scientists in 1951. This trialled despite Woolf and others facing scepticism and professional challenges, including the belief that PKU was untreatable due to its genetic nature. The result of the trial diet on a young PKU patient led to significant clinical improvement.

In 1957, Woolf and colleagues recommended mass screening for PKU using a ferric chloride test on urine samples from newborn babies. They emphasised the importance of early diagnosis and treatment, proposing screening at 21 days after birth.

This urine test was the basis of the first commercial PKU screening test, Phenistix, which was released the next year. Phenistix was adopted in various locations, including the United Kingdom and the United States, where screening programmes which emphasise early detection and treatment were adopted. In 1966–1967, Woolf's screening methods were adopted in Spain, with a pilot program in Granada.

Woolf moved to Vancouver in 1968, where he joined the University of British Columbia and continued research on phenylalanine biochemistry and metabolic diseases. His work extended beyond PKU to include a wide range of inborn errors of metabolism.

In 1979, Woolf discussed the variants of PKU, including cases with blood concentrations of phenylalanine below typical PKU levels, and the consequences of interrupting a low-phenylalanine diet in later childhood.

== Later life and death ==
Woolf retired in 1984, taking the title professor emeritus. He died in 2021 in Vancouver, Canada, aged 101 years old.
