= Phenylalanine ammonia-lyase =

Class of enzymes

phenylalanine ammonia-lyase
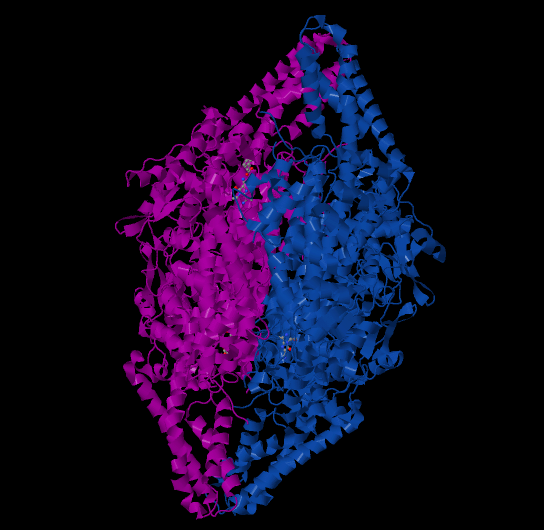
- PDB rendering based on 1T6J.

Identifiers
- EC no.: 4.3.1.24
- CAS no.: 9024-28-6

Databases
- IntEnz: IntEnz view
- BRENDA: BRENDA entry
- ExPASy: NiceZyme view
- KEGG: KEGG entry
- MetaCyc: metabolic pathway
- PRIAM: profile
- PDB structures: RCSB PDB PDBe PDBsum
- Gene Ontology: AmiGO / QuickGO
Search
- PMC: articles
- PubMed: articles
- NCBI: proteins

The enzyme phenylalanine ammonia lyase (EC 4.3.1.24) catalyzes the conversion of L-phenylalanine to ammonia and trans-cinnamic acid.:

L-phenylalanine = trans-cinnamate + NH_{3}

Phenylalanine ammonia lyase (PAL) is the first and committed step in the phenyl propanoid pathway and is therefore involved in the biosynthesis of the polyphenol compounds such as flavonoids, phenylpropanoids, and lignin in plants. Phenylalanine ammonia lyase is found widely in plants, as well as some bacteria, yeast, and fungi, with isoenzymes existing within many different species. It has a molecular mass in the range of 270–330 kDa. The activity of PAL is induced dramatically in response to various stimuli such as tissue wounding, pathogenic attack, light, low temperatures, and hormones. PAL has recently been studied for possible therapeutic benefits in humans afflicted with phenylketonuria. It has also been used in the generation of L-phenylalanine as precursor of the sweetener aspartame.

The enzyme is a member of the ammonia lyase family, which cleaves carbon–nitrogen bonds. Like other lyases, PAL requires only one substrate for the forward reaction, but two for the reverse. It is thought to be mechanistically similar to the related enzyme histidine ammonia-lyase (EC:4.3.1.3, HAL). The systematic name of this enzyme class is L-phenylalanine ammonia-lyase (trans-cinnamate-forming). Previously, it was designated as EC 4.3.1.5, but that class has been redesignated as EC 4.3.1.24 (phenylalanine ammonia-lyases), EC 4.3.1.25 (tyrosine ammonia-lyases), and EC 4.3.1.26 (phenylalanine/tyrosine ammonia-lyases). Other names in common use include tyrase, phenylalanine deaminase, tyrosine ammonia-lyase, L-tyrosine ammonia-lyase, phenylalanine ammonium-lyase, PAL, and L-phenylalanine ammonia-lyase.

== Mechanism ==
Phenylalanine ammonia lyase is specific for L-phenylalanine, and to a lesser extent, L-tyrosine. The reaction catalyzed by PAL is a spontaneous elimination reaction rather than an oxidative deamination.

The cofactor 3,5-dihydro-5-methyldiene-4H-imidazol-4-one (MIO) is involved in the reaction and sits atop the positive pole of three polar helices in the active site, which helps to increase its electrophilicity. MIO is attacked by the aromatic ring of L-phe, which activates the C-H bond on the β carbon for deprotonation by a basic residue. The carbanion intermediate of this E1cB-elimination reaction, which is stabilized by partial positive regions in the active site, then expels ammonia to form the cinnamate alkene. The mechanism of the reaction of PAL is thought to be similar to the mechanism of the related enzyme histidine ammonia lyase.

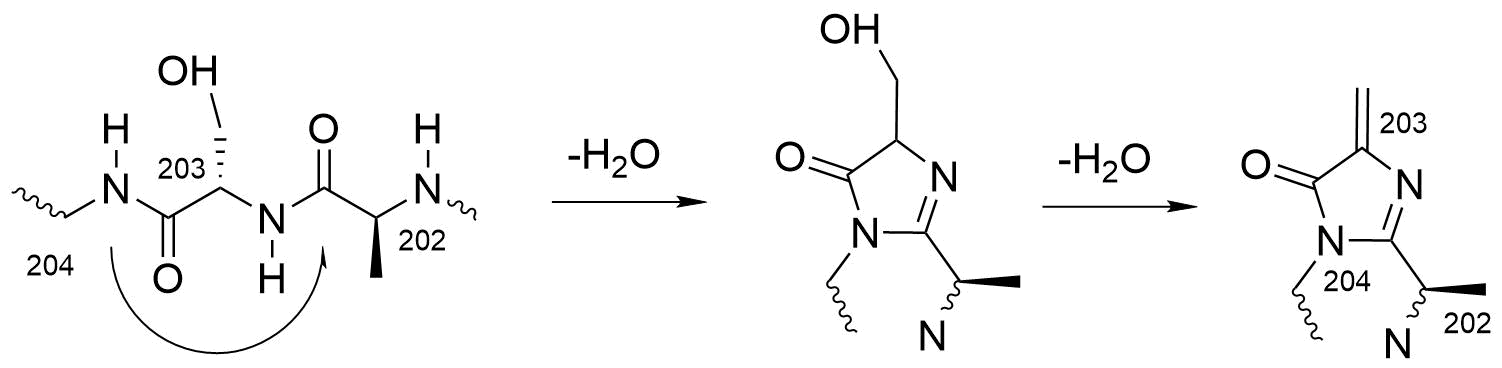
Proposed autocatalytic formation of MIO cofactor from the tripeptide Ala-Ser-Gly by two water elimination steps.

A dehydroalanine residue was long thought to be the key electrophilic catalytic residue in PAL and HAL, but the active residue was later found instead to be MIO, which is even more electrophilic. It is formed by cyclization and dehydration of conserved Ala-Ser-Gly tripeptide segment. The first step of MIO formation is a cyclization-elimination by an intramolecular nucleophilic attack of the nitrogen of Gly204 at the carbonyl group of Ala202. A subsequent water elimination from the side chain of Ser203 completes the system of crossconjugated double bonds. Numbers are given for the phenylalanine ammonia lyase from Petroselinum crispum (PDB 1W27). Although MIO is a polypeptide modification, it was proposed to call it a prosthetic group, because it has the quality of an added organic compound.

PAL is inhibited by trans-cinnamic acid, and, in some species, may be inhibited by trans-cinnamic acid derivatives. The unnatural amino acids D-Phe and D-Tyr, the enantiomeric forms of the normal substrate, are competitive inhibitors.

== Structure ==
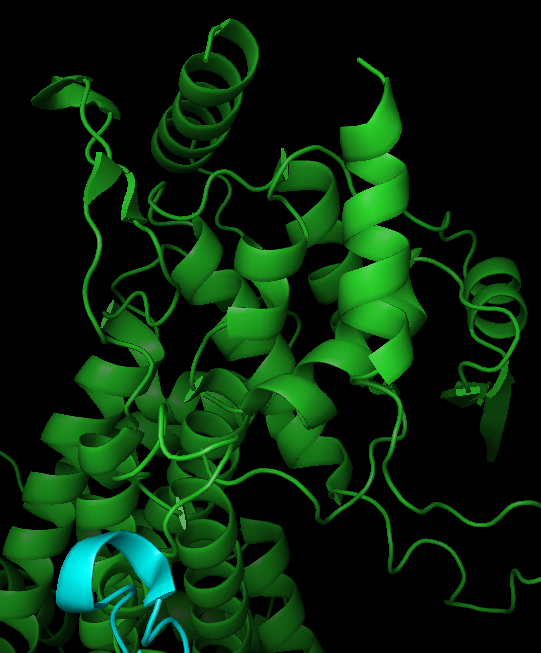
PAL active site

Phenylalanine ammonia lyase is composed of four identical subunits composed mainly of alpha-helices, with pairs of monomers forming a single active site. Catalysis in PAL may be governed by the dipole moments of seven different alpha helices associated with the active site. The active site contains the electrophilic group MIO non-covalently bonded to three helices. Leu266, Asn270, Val269, Leu215, Lys486, and Ile472 are located on the active site helices, while Phe413, Glu496, and Gln500 contribute to the stabilization of the MIO cofactor. The orientation of dipole moments generated by helices within the active site generates an electropositive region for ideal reactivity with MIO. The partially positive regions in the active site may also help stabilize the charge of a carbanion intermediate. PAL is structurally similar to the mechanistically related histidine ammonia lyase, although PAL has approximately 215 additional residues.

== Function ==
Phenylalanine ammonia lyase can perform different functions in different species. It is found mainly in some plants and fungi (i.e. yeast). In fungal and yeast cells, PAL plays an important catabolic role, generating carbon and nitrogen. In plants it is a key biosynthetic enzyme that catalyzes the first step in the synthesis of a variety of polyphenyl compounds and is mainly involved in defense mechanisms. PAL is involved in 5 metabolic pathways: tyrosine metabolism, phenylalanine metabolism, nitrogen metabolism, phenylpropanoid biosynthesis, and alkaloid biosynthesis.

== Disease relevance ==
Enzyme substitution therapy using PAL to treat phenylketonuria (PKU), an autosomal recessive genetic disorder in humans in which mutations in the phenylalanine hydroxylase (PAH, EC 1.14.16.1) gene inactivate the enzyme is being explored. This leads to an inability of the patient to metabolize phenylalanine, causing elevated levels of Phe in the bloodstream (hyperphenylalaninemia) and intellectual disability if therapy is not begun at birth.

In May 2018, the FDA approved pegvaliase, a recombinant PEGylated phenylalanine ammonia-lyase for the treatment of PKU that had been developed by Biomarin.

=== In plants ===
Lactuca sativa was investigated by Vàsquez et al. 2017. They find that UV-C treatment increased PAL enzyme activity. This increase results in decreased susceptibility to Botrytis cinerea.

== Research ==
=== Artificial sweeteners ===
The reverse reaction catalyzed by PAL has been explored for use to convert trans-cinnamic acid to L-phenylalanine, which is a precursor of the sweetener aspartame. This process was developed by Genex Corporation but was never commercially adopted.

=== Unnatural amino acid synthesis ===
Analogous to how aspartame is synthesized, PAL is also used to synthesize unnatural amino acids from various substituted cinnamic acids for research purposes. Steric hindrance from arene substitution limits PAL's utility for this purpose however. For instance, when Rhodotorula glutinis was used to affect this biotransformation the enzyme was discovered to be intolerant of all para substituents other than fluorine, presumably due to the element's small atomic radius. Meta and ortho positions were found to be more tolerant, but still limited by, larger substituents. For instance the enzyme's active site permitted ortho methoxy substitution but forbade meta ethoxy. Other organisms with different versions of the enzyme may be less limited in this way.

== Structural studies ==
As of late 2007, 5 structures have been solved for this class of enzymes, with PDB accession codes 1T6J, 1T6P, 1W27, 1Y2M, and 2NYF.
