= Lofenalac =

Infant powder formula

- Course: All
- Place of origin: United States
- Created by: Mead Johnson
- Main ingredients: an enzymatic hydrolysate of casein
- Variations: can be used to make ice cream, pudding, and cake
- Food energy (per serving): 65 kcal (270 kJ)
Other information
Lofenalac
Nutritional value per 100 g (3.5 oz)
- Energy: 272.142 kJ (65.043 kcal)
- Carbohydrates: 7.71 g
- Sugars: 7.10 g
- Fat: 2.4 g
- Saturated: 0.33 g
- Monounsaturated: 0.65 g
- Polyunsaturated: 1.53 g
- Protein: 2.14 g
Vitamins and minerals
Minerals	Quantity %DV^{†}
Potassium	2% 66 mg
Sodium	1% 31 mg
- Other constituents: Quantity
- Water: 87.10 g
- Ash: 510 mg

Lofenalac (pronunciation:Lo-fen-alac) is a registered, trademarked infant powder formula prescribed to replace milk in the diets of phenylketonuria sufferers in the infant and child stage. It is not recommended for non-PKU patients. In 1972, Lofenalac was declared a food by the FDA, for regulatory purposes.

Initially the only available formula recommended was made by Mead Johnson. Others, including Albumaid XP, Cymogran, and Minafen, have since been developed in Britain. Medical texts often recommend Lofenalac.

Lofenalac can be rather expensive to purchase and few retailers stock it. The taste and smell has been described by adult users as "medical" and offensive, although infants do not mind the flavor and children often consume it without complaint for some years.

== See also ==
- Kuvan (trade name for the cofactor tetrahydrobiopterin in a pill form)
- Diet therapy

== Resources ==
- O'Flynn, Margaret E. (August 1967). "Diet Therapy in Phenylketonuria". Am. J. Nurs. 67 (8). doi:10.2307/3420702. JSTOR 3420702. S2CID 33692992.
- Acosta, PB; Wenz E; Williamson M. (February 1978). "Methods of dietary inception in infants with PKU". J Am Diet Assoc. 72 (2): 164–9. doi:10.1016/S0002-8223(21)05947-2. PMID 624812. S2CID 1628419.
