= Ivar Asbjørn Følling =

Norwegian physician and biochemist

- Born: 23 August 1888; Kvam, Nordre Trondheim, Norway
- Died: 24 January 1973 (aged 84)
- Education: Norwegian Institute of Technology, Trondheim; University of Kristiania
- Known for: Discovery of phenylketonuria
- Awards: Fridtjof Nansen Prize for Outstanding Research, 1949; Knight 1st Grade of Order of St. Olav, 1958; Gunnerus Medal, 1966
- Scientific career
- Fields: Medicine, biochemistry, genetics
- Workplaces: University of Oslo, Oslo University Hospital

Ivar Asbjørn Følling (23 August 1888 – 24 January 1973) was a Norwegian physician and biochemist. He first described the disease commonly known as Følling's disease or phenylketonuria (PKU).

== Early life and education ==
He was born on 23 August 1888 at Kvam (in the present-day Steinkjer Municipality in Trøndelag county, Norway). Følling studied chemistry at the Norwegian Institute of Technology in Trondheim and graduated in 1916. He then went to the University of Kristiania (now the University of Oslo), graduating in medicine in 1922.

He received his cand.med. in 1929 after doing postgraduate work in Norway and abroad in Denmark, England, Vienna and the U.S. Starting in 1932, Følling occupied a series of medical posts in Oslo, culminating in his being Professor of Biochemistry and Physician-in-Chief at the central laboratory at the Norwegian national research hospital Oslo University Hospital. Følling was a professor of biochemistry at the University of Oslo for more than 30 years. He retired in 1958.

== Career ==
=== Discovery ===
In 1934 at Oslo University Hospital, Følling saw a young woman named Borgny Egeland. She had two children, Liv and Dag, who had been normal at birth but subsequently developed intellectual disability. When Dag was about a year old, the mother noticed a strong smell in his urine. Følling obtained urine samples from the children and, after many tests, found that the substance causing the odor in the urine was phenylpyruvic acid. The children, he concluded, had excess phenylpyruvic acid in the urine, the condition which came to be called phenylketonuria (PKU). This abnormal condition reflects an inability to break down the amino acid phenylalanine due to a hereditary deficiency of the necessary enzyme which is called phenylalanine hydroxylase.

=== Perspective ===
Følling's discovery provided the basis for the so-called metabolic screening of newborns. Today a screening blood test for PKU is done on newborns to detect the disease. With a special diet low in phenylalanine, PKU newborns can grow and develop into normal children and adults. Følling's work was too late to save Liv and Dag from severe progressive mental retardation (and in Dag's case, death) but it has saved thousands of children since then. It has been said that: "Følling is by many considered the most important medical scientist not to receive the Nobel Prize for Physiology or Medicine".

== Honours ==
- Fridtjof Nansen Prize for Outstanding Research - 1949
- Knight 1st Grade of Order of St. Olav - 1958
- Anders Jahres Award for Medical Research - 1960
- Joseph P. Kennedy Jr. Foundation Awards - 1962
- Gunnerus Medal - 1966

== Death ==
He died on 24 January 1973.
