= Leonard Parsons =

British Paediatrician

Sir Leonard Gregory Parsons MRCS FRCP FRCOG FRS (25 November 1879 - 17 December 1950) was a British Paediatrician.

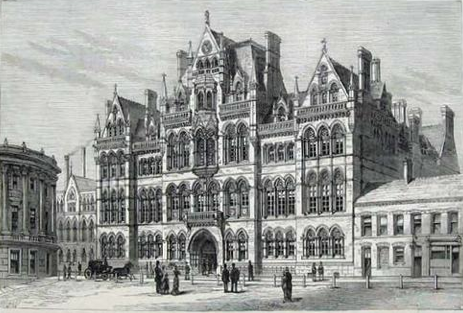
Mason College

Parsons studied at Mason College and the University of Birmingham from 1896 to 1903. He graduated with a University of London external degree in medicine in 1903.

He was Professor of Paediatrics at Birmingham University and dean of University of Birmingham Medical School. In 1932 he was the first to use synthetic Vitamin C to treat scurvy in children.

Parsons was awarded the Royal College of Physicians’s Moxon Medal in 1942 and delivered their Harveian Oration in 1950. He received a knighthood in 1946. He was elected a Fellow of the Royal Society in 1948.
