= Horst Bickel =

German medical doctor

Horst Bickel (28 June 1918 – 1 December 2000) was a German medical doctor.

With Guido Fanconi, he characterized Glycogen storage disease type XI in 1949.

He was also involved in the development of treatments for phenylketonuria. In 1951, Bickel, Evelyn Hickmans and John Gerrard were persuaded by a persistent mother to help her daughter, Sheila, who was suffering from phenylketonuria. They created a diet that was low in phenylalanine and the daughter's condition improved.

Despite Bickel’s contribution, his decision to discontinue Shiela’s treatment (even after knowing its effectiveness) caused her condition to worsen so much that she was moved out of her home into an institution for the rest of her life.

Bickel, Gerrard and Hickmans were awarded the John Scott Medal in 1962 for their discovery.

His birthday, 28 June, which he shares with Robert Guthrie, another important person for Phenylketonuria was taken up by the European Society for Phenylketonuria and Allied Disorders Treated as Phenylketonuria to launch the International PKU Day.
