= Louis Sydney Woolf =

Australian cricketer and barrister (1855–1942)

Louis Woolf
Personal information
- Full name: Louis Sydney Woolf
- Born: 28 July 1855; Melbourne, Australia
- Died: 6 July 1942 (aged 86); Melbourne, Australia

Domestic team information
- Years: Team
- 1878: Victoria
- Source: Cricinfo, 21 July 2015

Louis Sydney Woolf (28 July 1855 – 6 July 1942) was an Australian cricketer and barrister. He played one first-class cricket match for Victoria in 1878. He practised as a barrister in Melbourne from 1876 until his death in 1942.

== Life and career ==
Woolf was born in the inner Melbourne suburb of Fitzroy, and attended Scotch College and the University of Melbourne. He was admitted to the Victorian Bar in December 1876. He specialised in divorce cases and was an authority on divorce law.

Woolf played district cricket for South Melbourne as a batsman and, in the early part of his career, a specialist longstop fieldsman. As the cricket historian Ray Robinson explained, in those days of rough pitches, "enough awkward balls careered past wicketkeepers to require the longstop to be a man of tough hands and a brave heart, not to be panicked by shin-threatening skids and treacherous bounces. Such a man was Melbourne barrister Lou Woolf, a champion in the position." One day in the 1870s, while fielding at longstop for South Melbourne to the wicket-keeping of Jack Blackham, Woolf found he had nothing to do because Blackham was stopping everything, so he asked if he could move to a more useful position in the field. That day Blackham became the first keeper to do without a longstop, and he went on to carry the innovation into first-class and Test cricket. Within a few years the longstop position was virtually obsolete.

Woolf married Alice Maud Isaacs in Melbourne in April 1890. At the time of his death in July 1942 aged 86 he was Victoria's oldest practising barrister and Victoria's oldest representative cricketer. Alice died in July 1953, survived by their son and daughter.
