= Robert Guthrie (microbiologist) =

American microbiologist (1916–1995)

- Born: June 28, 1916; Marionville, Missouri
- Died: June 24, 1995 (aged 78); Seattle, Washington
- Known for: Inventing the bacterial inhibition assay used to screen newborns for phenylketonuria
- Scientific career
- Fields: Microbiology; Metabolism; Newborn screening

Robert Guthrie, MD, Ph.D. (June 28, 1916 – June 24, 1995) was an American microbiologist, best known for developing the bacterial inhibition assay used to screen infants for phenylketonuria at birth, before the development of irreversible neurological damage. Guthrie also pioneered the collection of whole blood on specially designed filter paper, commonly known as "Guthrie cards" as a sample medium that could be easily collected, transported and tested. Although Guthrie is best known for developing the test for phenylketonuria, he worked tirelessly to raise awareness of the need to screen for treatable conditions and adapted his method to early screening tests for galactosemia and maple syrup urine disease.

== Early life ==
Guthrie received his doctorate from the University of Minnesota, although his education took a circuitous route, as he eventually earned six degrees in six years, including both a medical doctorate and a doctor of philosophy. While in school, Guthrie married Margaret, a fellow student, and they eventually had six children together. His early research into bacterial inhibition assays came while he was employed by the Staten Island Public Health Hospital, testing antibiotic sensitivity.

== Research interests ==
Guthrie became interested in causes and prevention of intellectual disability after his son, John, was born disabled in 1947. Despite his work in the field, the cause of his son's disability was never diagnosed. In 1958, Guthrie's 15-month-old niece was diagnosed with phenylketonuria (PKU), a condition in which the body cannot metabolize phenylalanine. Untreated PKU results in irreversible neurological damage. After the discovery of PKU as a cause of intellectual disability, Horst Bickel and colleagues discovered that it could be treated successfully with a diet low in phenylalanine. The main drawback in successful treatment of PKU was the delay in identifying affected individuals. The common test for PKU at the time was mixing urine with ferric chloride. The excess phenylpyruvic acid in the urine of an individual with PKU would produce a bright green colour when reacting with the ferric chloride. Infants do not excrete high enough concentrations of this compound to give a positive test result, thus delaying their diagnosis, and allowing irreversible damage to take place. Guthrie's disabled son had driven his interest in causes of mental retardation, the diagnosis of his niece with PKU turned his attention to preventable causes. Others working with children who had PKU asked Guthrie to focus on a test that would allow for earlier identification, before irreversible damage had taken place.

== The Guthrie test ==
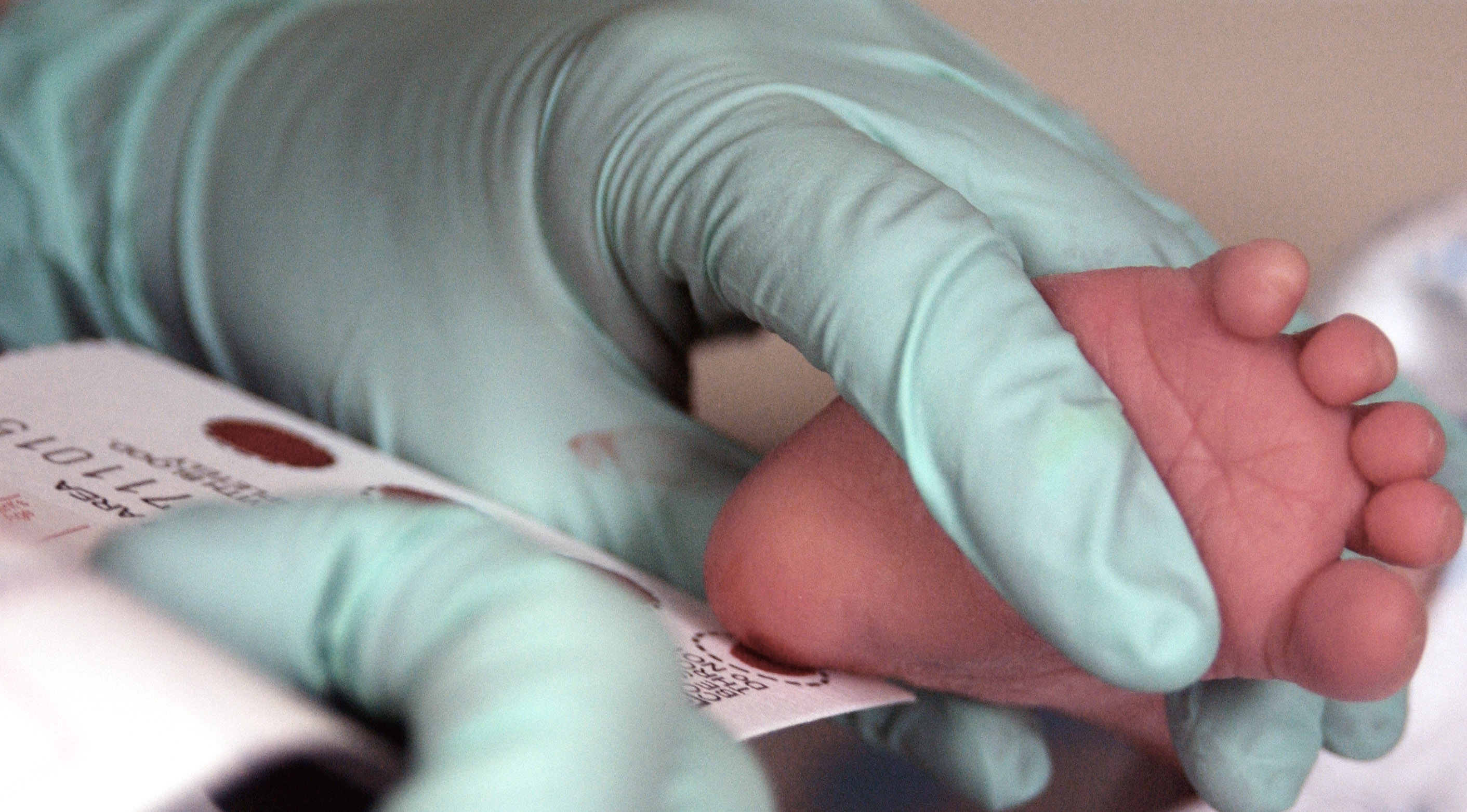
Whole blood being collected on filter paper for newborn screening.

Guthrie developed a simple method to screen for elevated phenylalanine levels using a bacterial inhibition assay. He cultured Bacillus subtilis on agar in the presence of a phenylalanine antagonist, inhibiting the growth. When exposed to blood from patients affected with PKU, the high levels of phenylalanine overcame the inhibition, and bacterial growth was visible. This assay was initially developed to allow monitoring of phenylalanine concentrations in known patients on dietary treatment using serum spotted onto filter paper. Guthrie recognized both the utility of this method as a screening test, and the need to eliminate serum as the sample type to minimize processing. He tested the assay using whole blood collected on filter paper from a heel stick. The collection of whole blood on special filter paper developed by Guthrie is still used in newborn screening programs around the world, allowing babies to be screened shortly after birth for a number of treatable conditions.

After establishing a test that could identify PKU in whole blood spots, Guthrie set out to test his method, starting in an institution in New York. Here, his test correctly identified all patients known to have PKU and also four who had previously been undiagnosed. In 1961, Guthrie and his lab started screening infants for PKU, a project that quickly expanded. In two years, they had tested 400,000 American newborns, and diagnosed 39 with PKU. This early diagnosis allowed for early treatment and avoidance of the most severe consequences of the disease. Throughout the 1960s, PKU testing expanded in the United States and around the world, eventually becoming required by law in many jurisdictions. With the success of PKU testing, Guthrie and his colleagues focused on screening tests for other diseases that can affect newborns. They developed bacterial inhibition assays for galactosemia and maple syrup urine disease that could be run using the same sample collection as the PKU test.

== Patent controversy ==
Guthrie decided that commercial production would be the most efficient way to manufacture 400,000 test kits, so he approached the Ames Company, a division of Miles Laboratories, which manufactured the older PKU tests. Ames said it would only manufacture the kits if a patent was issued, so Guthrie filed a patent application in 1962 and signed an exclusive licensing agreement with Miles, under which he would receive no royalties and 5% of the proceeds would be divided among the National Association for Retarded Children Research Fund, the Association for Aid of Crippled Children, and the University of Buffalo Foundation.

Miles couldn't produce the kits fast enough, so Guthrie produced his own kits for 500 tests at a cost of $6 each. But in 1963, he found out that Ames planned to charge $262 for the same kit.

Guthrie was appalled, but Ames wouldn't lower their price. Guthrie appealed to the U.S. Children's Bureau, which sponsored the field trial, and the Children's Bureau recommended that Miles not be granted exclusive commercial rights. Most of the funding to develop the tests had come from the Children's Bureau ($742,0000) and the Public Health Service ($251,700). The surgeon general determined that the invention belonged to the United States and abrogated the exclusive licensing agreement.

The dispute was the subject of a May, 1965 hearing by the Monopoly Subcommittee of the Select Committee on Small Business of the U.S. Senate. Committee chair Russell B. Long (D-LA) denounced the award of private patent rights on federally funded research, and said, "when the desire to make monopoly profits at the public's expense can adversely affect the health of our children, it is time to call a halt to this immoral and evil practice."

One of the defenders of Ames was Senator Birch Bayh (D-IN), who, with Senator Robert Dole (R-KS), in 1980 introduced the Bayh–Dole Act which allowed universities and small businesses to retain ownership of inventions developed with federal funding.

== Legacy ==
PKU Day

For the 100th birthday of Robert Guthrie the European Society for Phenylketonuria and Allied Disorders Treated as Phenylketonuria invited Patricia Guthrie to the annual conference to give a speech about her father. In subsequence she launched the Robert Guthrie Legacy Project to honor the efforts of Robert Guthrie to Phenylketonuria. His birthday, June 28, which is the same as the one of Horst Bickel, was taken up to launch the International PKU Day.

International Neonatal Screening Day

On June 28, 2021, IPOPI, ESID and ISNS launched the first International Neonatal Screening Day (INSD) as a tribute to Dr Robert Guthrie. INSD helps raise awareness about the value of neonatal screening, encourages improvements on existing screening programmes and the advancement of scientific developments.

=== Robert Guthrie Award ===
The International Society for Neonatal Screening awards the Robert Guthrie Award to a member "who has made an outstanding contribution to newborn or other population-based screening which is recognized as such world-wide". Notable recipients include New Zealand paediatrician Dianne Webster, who directed New Zealand's national newborn screening programme for twenty-five years.
