= Phenylketonuria =

Amino acid metabolic disorder

- Other names: Phenylalanine hydroxylase deficiency, PAH deficiency, Følling disease
- Phenylalanine
- Specialty: Medical genetics, pediatrics, dietetics
- Symptoms: Without treatment: intellectual disability, seizures, hyperactivity, psychiatric problems, musty odor
- Onset: At birth
- Duration: Lifelong
- Types: Classic, variant
- Causes: Genetic (autosomal recessive)
- Diagnostic method: Newborn screening programs in many countries
- Treatment: Diet low in foods that contain phenylalanine; special supplements
- Medication: Sapropterin dihydrochloride, pegvaliase
- Prognosis: Normal health with treatment
- Frequency: ~1 in 12,000 newborns

Phenylketonuria (PKU) is an inborn error of metabolism that results in decreased metabolism of the amino acid phenylalanine. Untreated PKU can lead to intellectual disability, seizures, behavioral problems, and mental disorders. It may also result in a musty smell and lighter skin. A baby born to a mother who has poorly treated PKU may have heart problems, a small head, and low birth weight.

Phenylketonuria is an inherited genetic disorder. It is caused by mutations in the PAH gene, which can result in inefficient or nonfunctional phenylalanine hydroxylase, an enzyme responsible for the metabolism of excess phenylalanine. This results in the buildup of dietary phenylalanine to potentially toxic levels. It is autosomal recessive, meaning that both copies of the gene must be mutated for the condition to develop. The two main types are classic PKU and variant PKU, depending on whether any enzyme function remains. Those with one copy of a mutated gene typically do not have symptoms. Many countries have newborn screening programs for the disease.

Treatment is with a diet low in foods that contain phenylalanine and includes special supplements. Babies should use a special formula with a small amount of breast milk. The diet should begin as soon as possible after birth and continue for life. People who are diagnosed early and maintain a strict diet can have normal health and a normal lifespan. Effectiveness is monitored through periodic blood tests. The medication sapropterin dihydrochloride may be useful in some.

Phenylketonuria affects about one in 12,000 babies. Males and females are affected equally. The disease was discovered in 1934 by Ivar Asbjørn Følling, with the importance of diet determined in 1935. As of 2023, genetic therapies that aim to directly restore liver PAH activity are a promising and active research field.

== Signs and symptoms ==
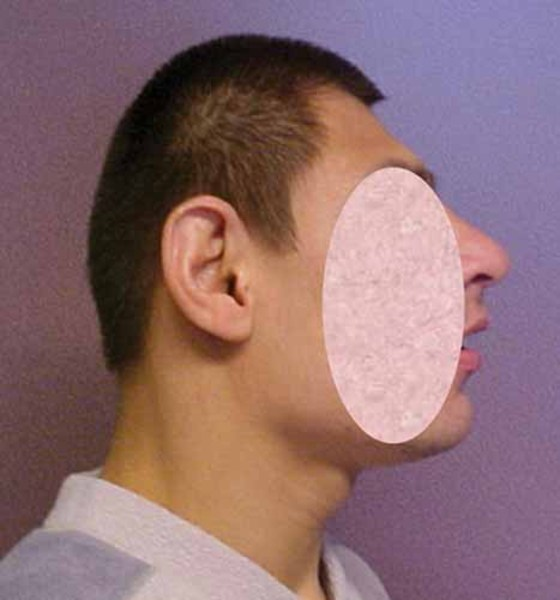
Abnormally small head (microcephaly)

Untreated PKU can lead to intellectual disability, seizures, behavioral problems, and mental disorders. It may also result in a musty smell and lighter skin. A baby born to a mother who has poorly treated PKU may have heart problems, a small head, and low birth weight.

Because the mother's body is able to break down phenylalanine during pregnancy, infants with PKU are normal at birth. The disease is not detectable by physical examination at that time, because no damage has yet been done. Newborn screening is performed to detect the disease and initiate treatment before any damage is done. The blood sample is usually taken by a heel prick, typically performed 2–7 days after birth. This test can reveal elevated phenylalanine levels after one or two days of normal infant feeding.

If a child is not diagnosed during the routine newborn screening test and a phenylalanine-restricted diet is not introduced, then phenylalanine levels in the blood will increase over time. Toxic levels of phenylalanine, along with insufficient levels of tyrosine, can interfere with infant development in ways that have permanent effects. The disease may present clinically with seizures, hypopigmentation (excessively fair hair and skin), and a "musty odor" to the baby's sweat and urine (due to phenylacetate, a carboxylic acid produced by the oxidation of phenylacetone). In most cases, a repeat test should be done around two weeks of age to verify the initial test and uncover any phenylketonuria that was initially missed.

Untreated children often fail to attain early developmental milestones, develop microcephaly, and demonstrate progressive impairment of cerebral function. Hyperactivity, EEG abnormalities, seizures, and severe learning disabilities are major clinical problems later in life. A characteristic "musty or mousy" odor on the skin, as well as a predisposition for eczema, persists throughout life in the absence of treatment.

The damage done to the brain if PKU is untreated during the first months of life is not reversible. Affected children who are detected at birth and treated are much less likely to develop neurological problems or have seizures and intellectual disability, though such clinical disorders are still possible including asthma, eczema, anemia, weight gain, renal insufficiency, osteoporosis, gastritis, esophagus, and kidney deficiencies, kidney stones, and hypertension. Additionally, mood disorders occur 230% higher than controls; dizziness and giddiness occur 180% higher; chronic ischemic heart disease, asthma, diabetes, and gastroenteritis occur 170% higher; and stress and adjustment disorder occur 160% higher. In general, however, outcomes for people treated for PKU are good. Treated people may have no detectable physical, neurological, or developmental problems at all.

== Genetics ==
Phenylketonuria is inherited in an autosomal recessive fashion.

PKU is an autosomal recessive metabolic genetic disorder. As such, two PKU alleles are required for an individual to experience symptoms of the disease. For a child to inherit PKU, both parents must have and pass on the defective gene. If both parents are carriers for PKU, any child they have will have a 25% chance to be born with the disorder, a 50% chance the child will be a carrier, and a 25% chance the child will neither develop nor be a carrier for the disease.

PKU is characterized by homozygous or compound heterozygous mutations in the gene for the hepatic enzyme phenylalanine hydroxylase (PAH), rendering it nonfunctional. This enzyme is necessary to metabolize the amino acid phenylalanine (Phe) to the amino acid tyrosine. When PAH activity is reduced, Phe accumulates and is converted into phenylpyruvate (also known as phenylketone), which can be detected in the urine.

Carriers of a single PKU allele do not exhibit symptoms of the disease, but appear to be protected to some extent against the fungal toxin ochratoxin A. Louis Woolf suggested that this accounted for the persistence of the allele in certain populations, in that it confers a selective advantage—in other words, being a heterozygote is advantageous.

The gene for PAH is located on chromosome 12 in the bands 12q22-q24.2. As of 2000, around 400 disease-causing mutations had been found in the PAH gene. This is an example of allelic genetic heterogeneity.

== Pathophysiology ==
When phenylalanine cannot be metabolized by the body, a typical diet that would be healthy for people without PKU causes abnormally high levels of phenylalanine to accumulate in the blood, which is toxic to the brain. If left untreated (and often even in treatment), complications of PKU include severe intellectual disability, brain function abnormalities, microcephaly, mood disorders, irregular motor functioning, and behavioral problems such as attention deficit hyperactivity disorder, as well as physical symptoms such as a "musty" odor, eczema, and unusually light skin and hair coloration.

=== Classical PKU ===
Classical PKU, and its less severe forms "mild PKU" and "mild hyperphenylalaninemia" are caused by a mutated gene for the enzyme phenylalanine hydroxylase (PAH), which converts phenylalanine to tyrosine, which is a conditionally essential amino acid for PKU patients, because without the enzyme PAH, tyrosine cannot be produced in the body through oxidation of Phe.

PAH deficiency causes a spectrum of disorders, including classic phenylketonuria (PKU) and mild hyperphenylalaninemia (also known as "hyperPhe" or "mild HPA"), a less severe accumulation of phenylalanine. Compared to classic PKU patients, patients with "hyperPhe" have greater PAH enzyme activity and are able to tolerate larger amounts of phenylalanine in their diets. Without dietary intervention, mild HPA patients have blood Phe levels higher than those people with normal PAH activity. Currently, no international consensus exists on the definition of mild HPA, but it is most frequently diagnosed at blood Phe levels between 2 and 6 mg/dL.

Phenylalanine is a large, neutral (hydrophobic) amino acid (LNAA). LNAAs compete for transport across the blood–brain barrier (BBB) via the large neutral amino acid transporter (LNAAT). If phenylalanine is in excess in the blood, it saturates the transporter. Excessive phenylalanine levels tend to decrease the levels of other LNAAs in the brain. As these amino acids are necessary for protein and neurotransmitter synthesis, Phe buildup disrupts the development of the brain, causing intellectual disability.

Recent research suggests that neurocognitive, psychosocial, quality of life, growth, nutrition, and bone pathology are slightly suboptimal even for patients who are treated and maintain their Phe levels in the target range if their diets are not supplemented with other amino acids.

Classic PKU affects myelination and white-matter tracts in untreated infants; this may be one major cause of neurological problems associated with phenylketonuria. Differences in white-matter development are observable with magnetic resonance imaging. Abnormalities in the gray matter can also be detected, particularly in the motor and premotor cortex, thalamus, and the hippocampus.

PKU may resemble amyloid diseases, such as Alzheimer's disease and Parkinson's disease, due to the formation of toxic amyloid-like assemblies of phenylalanine.

=== Tetrahydrobiopterin-deficient hyperphenylalaninemia ===
A rarer form of hyperphenylalaninemia is tetrahydrobiopterin deficiency, which occurs when the PAH enzyme is normal, and a defect is found in the biosynthesis or recycling of the cofactor tetrahydrobiopterin (BH_{4}). BH_{4} is necessary for proper activity of the enzyme PAH, and this coenzyme can be supplemented as treatment. Those with this form of hyperphenylalaninemia may have a deficiency of tyrosine (which is created from phenylalanine by PAH), in which case treatment is supplementation of tyrosine to account for this deficiency.

Levels of dopamine can be used to distinguish between these two types. Tetrahydrobiopterin is required to convert Phe to Tyr and is required to convert Tyr to L-DOPA via the enzyme tyrosine hydroxylase. L-DOPA, in turn, is converted to dopamine. Low levels of dopamine lead to high levels of prolactin. By contrast, in classical PKU (without dihydrobiopterin involvement), prolactin levels would be relatively normal.

As of 2020, tetrahydrobiopterin deficiency was known to result from defects in five genes.

=== Metabolic pathways ===
Pathophysiology of phenylketonuria, which is due to the absence of functional phenylalanine hydroxylase (classical subtype) or functional enzymes for the recycling of tetrahydrobiopterin (new variant subtype) utilized in the first step of the metabolic pathway.

The enzyme phenylalanine hydroxylase normally converts the amino acid phenylalanine into the amino acid tyrosine. If this reaction does not occur, phenylalanine accumulates and tyrosine is deficient. Excessive phenylalanine can be metabolized into phenylketones through the minor route, a transaminase pathway with glutamate. Metabolites include phenylacetate, phenylpyruvate and phenethylamine. Elevated levels of phenylalanine in the blood and detection of phenylketones in the urine is diagnostic, however, most patients are diagnosed via newborn screening.

== Screening ==
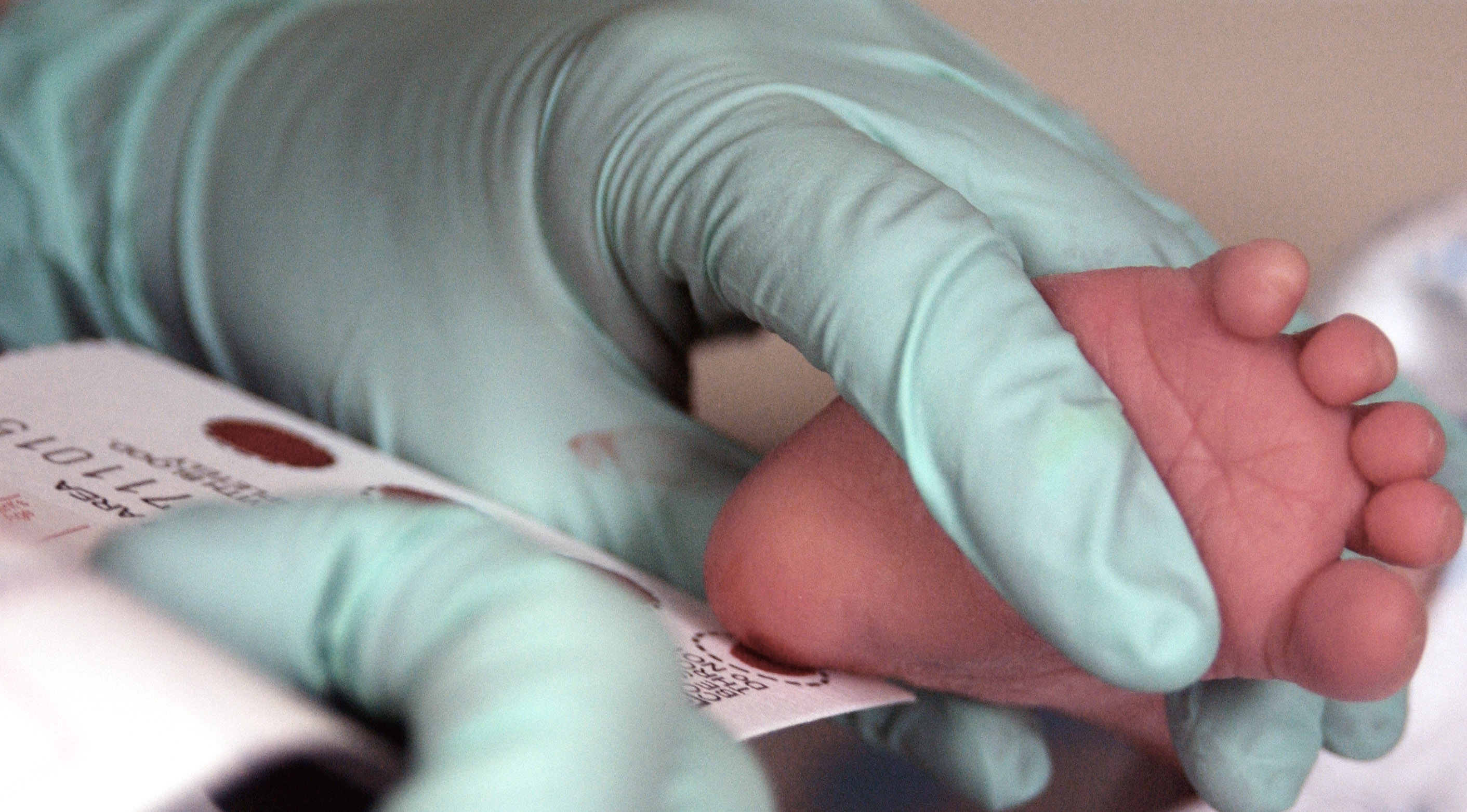
Blood is taken from a two-week-old baby to test for phenylketonuria

PKU is commonly included in the newborn screening panel of many countries, with varied detection techniques. Most babies born in Europe, North America, and Australia are screened for PKU soon after birth. Screening for PKU is done with bacterial inhibition assay (Guthrie test), immunoassays using fluorometric or photometric detection, or amino acid measurement using tandem mass spectrometry (MS/MS). Measurements done using MS/MS determine the concentration of Phe and the ratio of Phe to tyrosine, as the ratio will be elevated in PKU.

== Treatment ==
PKU is not curable. However, if it is diagnosed early enough, an affected newborn can grow up with normal brain development by managing and controlling phenylalanine ("Phe") levels through diet, or a combination of diet and medication. If dietary treatment is not initiated within 2 weeks after birth, the child is likely to develop permanent intellectual disability, even if dietary interventions begin shortly thereafter.

=== Diet ===
People who follow the prescribed dietary treatment from birth may (but not always) have no symptoms. Their PKU would be detectable only by a blood test. People must adhere to a diet low in Phe for optimal brain development. Since Phe is necessary to synthesize most proteins, it is required for appropriate growth, but levels must be strictly controlled.

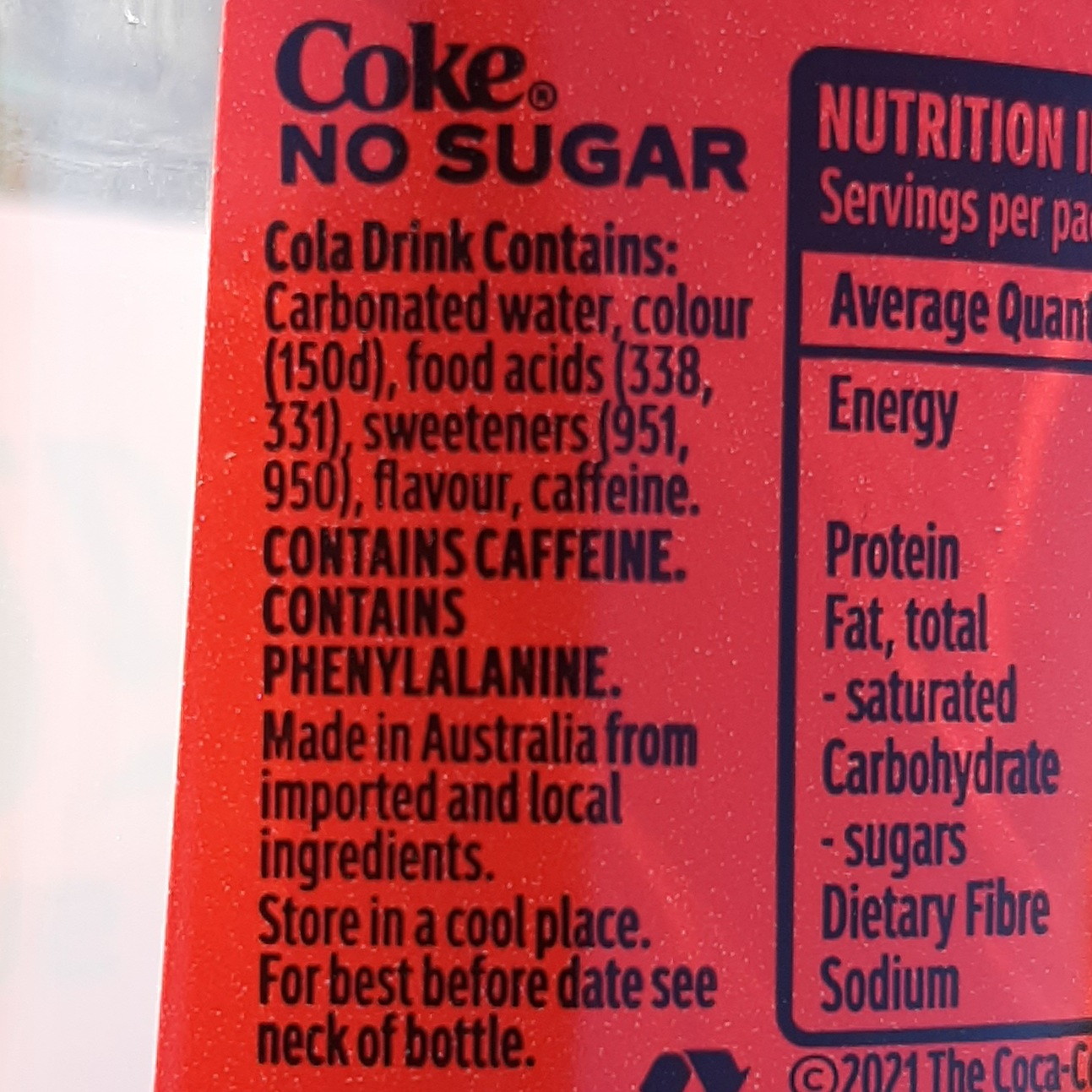
Warning for people with phenylketonuria on a label for an aspartame-containing drink

Optimal health ranges (or "target ranges") are between 120 and 360 μmol/L or equivalently 2 to 6 mg/dL. This is optimally achieved during at least the first 10 years, to allow the brain to develop normally.

The diet requires restricting or eliminating foods high in phenylalanine (Phe), particularly high-protein foods such as meat, fish, eggs, dairy products, legumes, nuts, and soy-based products. Specialized low-phenylalanine medical foods are typically used to meet nutritional requirements. Starchy foods, such as potatoes and corn are generally acceptable in controlled amounts, but the quantity of Phe consumed from these foods must be monitored. A corn-free diet may be prescribed in some cases. A food diary is usually kept to record the amount of Phe consumed with each meal, snack, or drink. An "exchange" system can be used to calculate the amount of Phe in a portion of food from the protein content identified on a nutritional information label. Lower-protein "medical food" substitutes are often used in place of regular bread, pasta, and other grain-based foods, which contain a significant amount of Phe. Many fruits and vegetables are lower in Phe and can be eaten in larger quantities. Infants may still be breastfed to receive all of the benefits of breastmilk, but the quantity must also be monitored, and supplementation with missing nutrients will be required. The sweetener aspartame, present in many diet foods and soft drinks, must also be avoided, as aspartame contains phenylalanine.

In addition, the amino acid tyrosine becomes essential in people with phenylalanine hydroxylase deficiency. Thus, in addition to the careful reduction of Phe in the diet, Tyr must be supplemented to ensure that nutritional needs are met.

Different people can tolerate different amounts of Phe in their diet. Regular blood tests are used to determine the effects of dietary Phe intake on blood Phe level.

=== Nutritional supplements ===
Supplementary "protein substitute" formulas are typically prescribed for people with PKU (starting in infancy) to provide the amino acids and other necessary nutrients that would otherwise be lacking in a low-phenylalanine diet. Tyrosine, which is normally derived from phenylalanine and which is necessary for normal brain function, is usually supplemented. Consumption of the protein substitute formulas can actually reduce phenylalanine levels, probably because it stops the process of protein catabolism from releasing Phe stored in the muscles and other tissues into the blood. Many PKU patients have their highest Phe levels after a period of fasting (such as overnight) because fasting triggers catabolism. A diet that is low in phenylalanine but does not include protein substitutes may also fail to lower blood Phe levels, since a nutritionally insufficient diet may also trigger catabolism. For all these reasons, the prescription formula is an important part of the treatment for patients with classic PKU.

Evidence supports dietary supplementation with large neutral amino acids (LNAAs). The LNAAs (e.g. Leu, Tyr, Trp, Met, His, Ile, Val, Thr) may compete with Phe for specific carrier proteins that transport LNAAs across the intestinal mucosa into the blood and across the blood–brain barrier into the brain. Its use is limited in the US due to the cost but is available in most countries as part of a low protein / PHE diet to replace missing nutrients.

Another treatment strategy is casein glycomacropeptide (CGMP), which is a milk peptide naturally free of Phe in its pure form. CGMP can substitute for the main part of the free amino acids in the PKU diet and provides several beneficial nutritional effects compared to free amino acids. The fact that CGMP is a peptide ensures that the absorption rate of its amino acids is prolonged compared to free amino acids and thereby results in improved protein retention and increased satiety compared to free amino acids. Another important benefit of CGMP is that the taste is significantly improved when CGMP substitutes part of the free amino acids and this may help ensure improved compliance to the PKU diet.

Furthermore, CGMP contains a high amount of the Phe-lowering LNAAs, which constitutes about 41 g per 100 g protein and will therefore help maintain plasma Phe levels in the target range.

=== Enzyme substitutes ===
In 2018, the FDA approved an enzyme substitute called pegvaliase which metabolizes phenylalanine. It is for adults who are poorly managed on other treatments.

Tetrahydrobiopterin (BH4) (a cofactor for the oxidation of phenylalanine) when taken by mouth can reduce blood levels of this amino acid in some people.

=== Mothers ===
For women with PKU, it is important for the health of their children to maintain low Phe levels before and during pregnancy. Though the developing fetus may only be a carrier of the PKU gene, the intrauterine environment can have very high levels of phenylalanine, which can cross the placenta. The child may develop congenital heart disease, growth retardation, microcephaly, and intellectual disability as a result.

In most countries, women with PKU who wish to have children are advised to lower their blood Phe levels (typically to between 2 and 6 mg/dL) before they become pregnant, and carefully control their levels throughout the pregnancy. This is achieved by performing regular blood tests and adhering very strictly to a diet, in general, monitored on a day-to-day basis by a specialist metabolic dietitian. In many cases, as the fetus' liver begins to develop and produce PAH normally, the mother's blood Phe levels will drop, requiring an increased intake to remain within the safe range of 2–6 mg/dL. The mother's daily Phe intake may double or even triple by the end of the pregnancy, as a result. When maternal blood Phe levels fall below 2 mg/dL, anecdotal reports indicate that the mothers may experience adverse effects, including headaches, nausea, hair loss, and general malaise. When low phenylalanine levels are maintained for the duration of pregnancy, there are no elevated levels of risk of birth defects compared with a baby born to a non-PKU mother.

== Epidemiology ==
Country	Incidence
Australia	1 in 10,000
Brazil	1 in 8,690
Canada	1 in 22,000
China	1 in 17,000
Czechoslovakia	1 in 7,000
Denmark	1 in 12,000
Finland	1 in 200,000
France	1 in 13,500
India	1 in 18,300
Ireland	1 in 4,500
Italy	1 in 17,000
Japan	1 in 125,000
Korea	1 in 41,000
Netherlands	1 in 18,000
Norway	1 in 14,500
Philippines	1 in 102,000
Poland	1 in 8,000
Scotland	1 in 5,300
Spain	1 in 20,000
Sweden	1 in 20,000
Turkey	1 in 2,600
United Kingdom	1 in 10,000
United States	1 in 25,000

The average number of new cases of PKU varies in different human populations. United States Caucasians are affected at a rate of 1 in 10,000. Turkey has the highest documented rate in the world, with 1 in 2,600 births, while countries such as Finland and Japan have extremely low rates with fewer than one case of PKU in 100,000 births. A 1987 study from Slovakia reports a Roma population with an extremely high incidence of PKU (one case in 40 births) due to extensive inbreeding. It is the most common amino acid metabolic problem in the United Kingdom.

== History ==
Before the causes of PKU were understood, PKU caused severe disability in most people who inherited the relevant mutations. Nobel and Pulitzer Prize-winning author Pearl S. Buck had a daughter named Carol who lived with PKU before treatment was available, and wrote an account of its effects in a book called The Child Who Never Grew. Many untreated PKU patients born before widespread newborn screening are still alive, largely in dependent living homes/institutions.

Phenylketonuria was discovered by the Norwegian physician Ivar Asbjørn Følling in 1934 when he noticed hyperphenylalaninemia (HPA) was associated with intellectual disability. In Norway, this disorder is known as Følling's disease, named after its discoverer. Følling was one of the first physicians to apply detailed chemical analysis to the study of disease.

In 1934 at Rikshospitalet, Følling saw a young woman named Borgny Egeland. She had two children, Liv and Dag, who had been normal at birth but subsequently developed intellectual disability. When Dag was about a year old, the mother noticed a strong smell in his urine. Følling obtained urine samples from the children and, after many tests, he found that the substance causing the odor in the urine was phenylpyruvic acid. The children, he concluded, had excess phenylpyruvic acid in the urine, the condition which came to be called phenylketonuria (PKU).

His analysis of the urine of the two affected siblings led him to request many physicians near Oslo to test the urine of other affected patients. This led to the discovery of the same substance he had found in eight other patients. He conducted tests and found reactions that gave rise to benzaldehyde and benzoic acid, which led him to conclude that the compound contained a benzene ring. Further testing showed the melting point to be the same as phenylpyruvic acid, which indicated that the substance was in the urine.

In 1954, Horst Bickel, Evelyn Hickmans and John Gerrard published a paper that described how they created a diet that was low in phenylalanine and the patient recovered. Bickel, Gerrard, and Hickmans were awarded the John Scott Medal in 1962 for their discovery.

PKU was the first disorder to be routinely diagnosed through widespread newborn screening. Robert Guthrie introduced the newborn screening test for PKU in the early 1960s. With the knowledge that PKU could be detected before symptoms were evident, and treatment initiated, screening was quickly adopted around the world. Ireland was the first country to introduce a national screening programme in February 1966, Austria also started screening in 1966 and England in 1968.

In 2017, the European Guidelines were published. They were called for by the patient organizations such as the European Society for Phenylketonuria and Allied Disorders Treated as Phenylketonuria. They have received some critical reception.

== Etymology and pronunciation ==
The word phenylketonuria uses combining forms of phenyl + ketone + -uria; it is pronounced /ˌfiːnaɪlˌkiːtəˈnjʊəriə, ˌfɛn-, -nɪl-, -nəl-, -toʊ-/.

== European Society for Phenylketonuria and Allied Disorders Treated as Phenylketonuria ==
European Society for Phenylketonuria and Allied Disorders Treated as Phenylketonuria
- Formation: 1987
- Founded at: Belgium
- Members: 41
- Volunteers: 10
- Website: espku.org

The European Society for Phenylketonuria and Allied Disorders Treated as Phenylketonuria (E.S.PKU) is a Europe-based non-profit organization. It was founded in 1987 by patient-driven associations to help improve the treatment of PKU in Europe.

=== Organization ===
The E.S.PKU has 41 member organizations from across Europe. One of the later countries to join was the French association Les Feux Follets in 2013. A member organization has to be a non-profit organization on a national level dealing with phenylketonuria patients. The E.S.PKU executive board is elected by the annual general meeting every three years and consists of volunteers. The Scientific advisory committee oversees projects like the European Guidelines and collects data to support studies in the field of phenylketonuria.

Besides the political work (such as METAB-ERN or EXCEMED) on European level, the E.S.PKU hosts an annual conference.

=== Projects ===
==== Benchmark report ====
The E.S.PKU benchmark report assesses the differences in care across Europe and provides a starting point for the E.S.PKU to improve any gaps in care that have been identified. In consequence, the delegates decided that action is required to improve this situation. The report was presented at the European Parliament. To underline this effort, the consensus paper was written.

==== Consensus paper ====
In 2013 the E.S.PKU delegates launched a paper describing the needs for a better and equal treatment across Europe. This paper subsequently lead to the first European Guidelines for Phenylketonuria.

==== European guidelines for phenylketonuria ====
The consensus paper was picked up by the Scientific Advisory Committee of the E.S.PKU. The SAC launched an expert group, the creation the first European Guidelines for Phenylketonuria. This led to the first publication of the key statements in the lancet diabetes and endocrinology. By the end of the year, the complete guidelines were published in the Orphanet Journal of Rare Diseases. The publication also received some critical attention from other medical professionals. A second version of the guidelines is already been worked on.

==== International PKU Day ====
The International PKU Day was launched in 2013 and is taking place on 28 June every year. It was inspired by the Rare Disease Day and should increase the awareness for Phenylketonuria to get featured in news. This date was chosen because of the birthdays of both Robert Guthrie (born 28 June 1916) and Horst Bickel (born 28 June 1918). As both of these people had a tremendous impact on the dietary treatment for Phenylketonuria the date proved to be the best option. In subsequence, the Robert Guthrie Memorial site was launched.

==== Documentations / films ====
To highlights certain aspects of the Phenylketonuria treatment and to raise public awareness, the E.S.PKU produces films / documentations.

Films produced by E.S.PKU
Title	Description	Release date
The forgotten Children	Documentation about untreated PKU patients	28.06.2016
The legacy of Horst Bickel	Documentation about Horst Bickel for his 100th birthday	28.06.2018

=== Annual conference ===
Every year, the E.S.PKU and a member country host a conference. The conference takes place in a different country every year and typically has 450-550 participants. The conference takes place at the end of the year and starts on a Thursday, ending on Sunday. There are three separate conference tracks for patients and families, professionals and delegates. The last conference took place in November and was located in Venice, Italy and got some media attention.

== Research ==
Other therapies are under investigation, including gene therapy.

BioMarin is conducting clinical trials to investigate PEG-PAL (PEGylated recombinant phenylalanine ammonia lyase or 'PAL'), which is an enzyme substitution therapy in which the missing PAH enzyme is replaced with an analogous enzyme that also breaks down Phe (to ammonia and trans-cinnamic acid). PEG-PAL was in Phase 2 clinical development as of 2015, but was put on clinical hold in September 2021. In February 2022, the FDA issued a statement requiring further data from non-clinical studies to assess oncogenic risk resulting from PEG-PAL treatments.

== See also ==
- Hyperphenylalanemia
- Lofenalac
- Tetrahydrobiopterin deficiency
