= Heterolysis =

Heterolysis may refer to:

- Heterolysis (biology), the apoptosis induced by hydrolytic enzymes from surrounding cells
- Heterolysis (chemistry), a chemical bond cleavage of a neutral molecule generating a cation and an anion

== See also ==
- Homolysis (disambiguation)
