= Vitamin B12-binding domain =

Type of protein domain

B12-binding
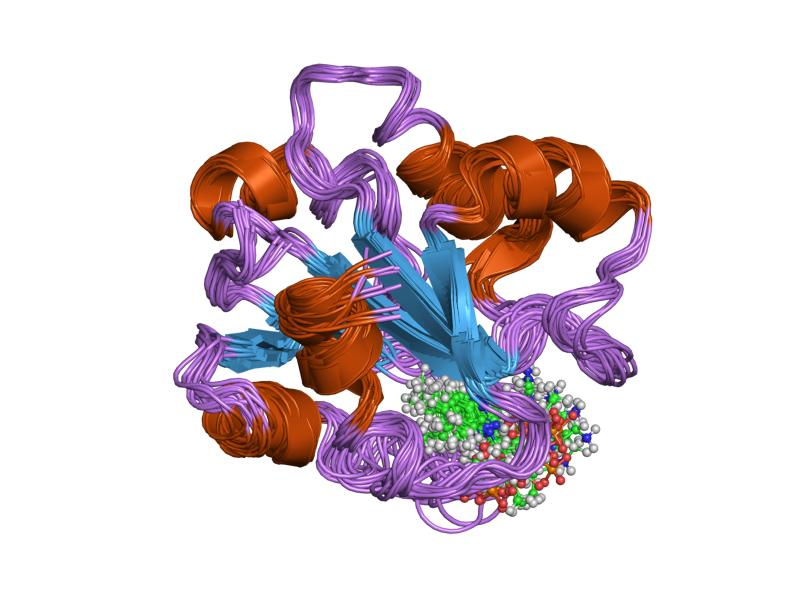
- nmr structure of glutamate mutase (b12-binding subunit) complexed with the vitamin b12 nucleotide

Identifiers
- Symbol: B12-binding
- Pfam: PF02310
- InterPro: IPR006158
- SCOP2: 1be1 / SCOPe / SUPFAM
Available protein structures:
- Pfam: structures / ECOD
- PDB: RCSB PDB; PDBe; PDBj
- PDBsum: structure summary

B12-binding_2 (4-helical bundle cap domain)
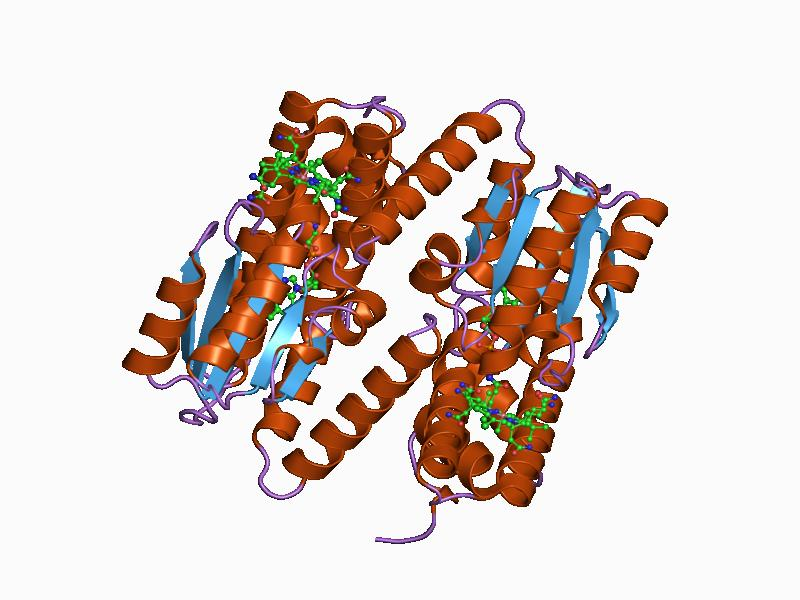
- how a protein binds b12: a 3.o angstrom x-ray structure of the b12-binding domains of methionine synthase

Identifiers
- Symbol: B12-binding_2
- Pfam: PF02607
- InterPro: IPR003759
- SCOP2: 1bmt / SCOPe / SUPFAM
Available protein structures:
- Pfam: structures / ECOD
- PDB: RCSB PDB; PDBe; PDBj
- PDBsum: structure summary

In molecular biology, the vitamin B12-binding domain is a protein domain which binds to cobalamin (vitamin B12). It can bind two different forms of the cobalamin cofactor, with cobalt bonded either to a methyl group (methylcobalamin) or to 5'-deoxyadenosine (adenosylcobalamin). Cobalamin-binding domains are mainly found in two families of enzymes present in animals and prokaryotes, which perform distinct kinds of reactions at the cobalt-carbon bond. Enzymes that require methylcobalamin carry out methyl transfer reactions. Enzymes that require adenosylcobalamin catalyse reactions in which the first step is the cleavage of adenosylcobalamin to form cob(II)alamin and the 5'-deoxyadenosyl radical, and thus act as radical generators. In both types of enzymes the B12-binding domain uses a histidine to bind the cobalt atom of cobalamin cofactors. This histidine is embedded in a DXHXXG sequence, the most conserved primary sequence motif of the domain. Proteins containing the cobalamin-binding domain include:

- Animal and prokaryotic methionine synthase (EC 2.1.1.13), which catalyse the transfer of a methyl group from methyl-cobalamin to homocysteine, yielding enzyme-bound cob(I)alamin and methionine.
- Animal and prokaryotic methylmalonyl-CoA mutase (EC 5.4.99.2), which are involved in the degradation of several amino acids, odd-chain fatty acids and cholesterol via propionyl-CoA to the tricarboxylic acid cycle.
- Prokaryotic lysine 5,6-aminomutase (EC 5.4.3.4).
- Prokaryotic glutamate mutase (EC 5.4.99.1).
- Prokaryotic methyleneglutarate mutase (EC 5.4.99.4).
- Prokaryotic isobutyryl-CoA mutase (EC 5.4.99.13).

The core structure of the cobalamin-binding domain is characterised by a five-stranded alpha/beta (Rossmann) fold, which consists of 5 parallel beta-sheets surrounded by 4-5 alpha helices in three layers (alpha/beta/alpha). Upon binding cobalamin, important elements of the binding site appear to become structured, including an alpha-helix that forms on one side of the cleft accommodating the nucleotide 'tail' of the cofactor. In cobalamin, the cobalt atom can be either free (dmb-off) or bound to dimethylbenzimidazole (dmb-on) according to the pH. When bound to the cobalamin-binding domain, the dimethylbenzimidazole ligand is replaced by the active histidine (His-on) of the DXHXXG motif. The replacement of dimethylbenzimidazole by histidine allows switching between the catalytic and activation cycles. In methionine synthase the cobalamin cofactor is sandwiched between the cobalamin-binding domain and an approximately 90 residues N-terminal domain forming a helical bundle comprising two pairs of antiparallel helices. This N-terminal domain forms a 4-helical bundle cap, in the conversion to the active conformation of this enzyme, the 4-helical cap rotates to allow the cobalamin cofactor to bind the activation domain.
