= Bond cleavage =

Splitting of a chemical bond

In chemistry, bond cleavage, or bond fission, is the splitting of chemical bonds. This can be generally referred to as dissociation when a molecule is cleaved into two or more fragments.

In general, there are two classifications for bond cleavage: homolytic and heterolytic, depending on the nature of the process. The triplet and singlet excitation energies of a sigma bond can be used to determine if a bond will follow the homolytic or heterolytic pathway. A metal−metal sigma bond is an exception because the bond's excitation energy is extremely high, thus cannot be used for observation purpose.

In some cases, bond cleavage requires catalysts. Due to the high bond-dissociation energy of C−H bonds, around 100 kcal/mol (420 kJ/mol), a large amount of energy is required to cleave the hydrogen atom from the carbon and bond a different atom to the carbon.

== Homolytic cleavage ==
Homolytic cleavage

In homolytic cleavage, or homolysis, the two electrons in a cleaved covalent bond are divided equally between the products. This process is also known as homolytic fission or radical fission. The bond-dissociation energy of a bond is the amount of energy required to cleave the bond homolytically. This enthalpy change is one measure of bond strength.

The triplet excitation energy of a sigma bond is the energy required for homolytic dissociation, but the actual excitation energy may be higher than the bond-dissociation energy due to the repulsion between electrons in the triplet state.

== Heterolytic cleavage ==
Heterolytic cleavage

In heterolytic cleavage, or heterolysis, the bond breaks in such a fashion that the originally-shared pair of electrons remain with one of the fragments. Thus, a fragment gains an electron, having both bonding electrons, while the other fragment loses an electron. This process is also known as ionic fission.

The singlet excitation energy of a sigma bond is the energy required for heterolytic dissociation, but the actual singlet excitation energy may be lower than the bond-dissociation energy of heterolysis as a result of the Coulombic attraction between the two ion fragments. The singlet excitation energy of a silicon–silicon sigma bond is lower than the carbon–carbon sigma bond, even though their bond strengths are 327kJ/mol and 607kJ/mol respectively, because silicon has higher electron affinity and lower ionization potential than carbon.

Heterolysis occurs naturally in reactions that involve electron donor ligands and transition metals which have empty orbitals.

== Ring-opening ==
Epoxide opening

In a ring-opening, the cleaved molecule remains as a single unit. The bond breaks, but the two fragments remain attached by other parts of the structure. For example, an epoxide ring can be opened by heterolytic cleavage of one of the polar carbon–oxygen bonds to give a single acyclic structure.

== Applications ==
In biochemistry, the process of breaking down large molecules by splitting their internal bonds is catabolism. Enzymes which catalyse bond cleavage are known as lyases, unless they operate by hydrolysis or oxidoreduction, in which case they are known as hydrolases and oxidoreductases respectively.

In proteomics, cleaving agents are used in proteome analysis, where proteins are cleaved into smaller peptide fragments. Examples of cleaving agents used are cyanogen bromide, pepsin, and trypsin.
