= BCKDH =

BCKDH may refer to:

- (3-methyl-2-oxobutanoate dehydrogenase (2-methylpropanoyl-transferring))-phosphatase, an enzyme
- 3-methyl-2-oxobutanoate dehydrogenase, an enzyme
- Branched-chain α-keto acid dehydrogenase complex, a complex of enzymes
