= Acrylyl-CoA reductase (NADH) =

Identifiers
- EC no.: 1.3.1.95

Databases
- IntEnz: IntEnz view
- BRENDA: BRENDA entry
- ExPASy: NiceZyme view
- KEGG: KEGG entry
- MetaCyc: metabolic pathway
- PRIAM: profile
- PDB structures: RCSB PDB PDBe PDBsum
Search
- PMC: articles
- PubMed: articles
- NCBI: proteins

Acrylyl-CoA reductase (NADH) (EC 1.3.1.95) is an enzyme with systematic name propanoyl-CoA:NAD^{+} oxidoreductase. This enzyme catalyses the following chemical reaction

propanoyl-CoA + NAD^{+} $\rightleftharpoons$ acryloyl-CoA + NADH + H^{+}

The reaction is catalysed in the opposite direction.
