= Isobutyryl-CoA mutase =

isobutyryl-CoA mutase

Identifiers
- EC no.: 5.4.99.13

Databases
- IntEnz: IntEnz view
- BRENDA: BRENDA entry
- ExPASy: NiceZyme view
- KEGG: KEGG entry
- MetaCyc: metabolic pathway
- PRIAM: profile
- PDB structures: RCSB PDB PDBe PDBsum
- Gene Ontology: AmiGO / QuickGO
Search
- PMC: articles
- PubMed: articles
- NCBI: proteins

In enzymology, an isobutyryl-CoA mutase (EC 5.4.99.13) is an enzyme that catalyzes the chemical reaction

2-methylpropanoyl-CoA $\rightleftharpoons$ butanoyl-CoA

Hence, this enzyme has one substrate, 2-methylpropanoyl-CoA, and one product, butanoyl-CoA.

This enzyme belongs to the family of isomerases, specifically those intramolecular transferases transferring other groups. The systematic name of this enzyme class is 2-methylpropanoyl-CoA CoA-carbonylmutase. Other names in common use include isobutyryl coenzyme A mutase, and butyryl-CoA:isobutyryl-CoA mutase. It uses adenosylcobalamin as a cofactor, which is bound at the enzyme's vitamin B12-binding domain. The mechanism of action of the enzyme is to generate a 5′-deoxyadenosyl radical by homolytic cleavage of the cobalt-carbon bond of the cofactor. This radical abstracts a hydrogen atom from the substrate to initiate the rearrangement reaction.
