= Silicon carbonate =

Identifiers
3D model (JSmol)	Interactive image
ChemSpider	65791696
PubChem CID	129651326
- InChI: InChI=1S/CO4Si/c2-1-3-6(2,4-1)5-1 Key: FJPABMGKXWVLHT-UHFFFAOYSA-N
- SMILES: [C].[Si].[O].[O].[O].[O]

Properties
Chemical formula	CO_{4}Si
Molar mass	104.092 g·mol^{−1}
- Except where otherwise noted, data are given for materials in their standard state (at 25 °C [77 °F], 100 kPa). Infobox references

Silicon carbonate is a crystalline substance formed under pressure from silica and carbon dioxide. The formula of the substance is SiCO_{4}. To produce it silicalite is compressed with carbon dioxide at a pressure of 18 GPa and a temperature around 740 K (467 °C; 872 °F). The silicon carbonate made this way has carbonate linked to silicon by way of oxygen in unidentate, bidentate, or bridged positions. However a stable crystal structure is not formed in these conditions. The phase produced is amorphous, but it has carbon in three-fold coordination, and silicon in six-fold coordination. When decompressed, not all carbon is released as carbon dioxide. If this really exists, the substance should be dynamically stable when reduced to atmospheric pressure.

There was also a claim to have made a silicon carbonate with a cristobalite structure, where both carbon and silicon are surrounded by four oxygen atoms. The substance was made by heating carbon dioxide and silica at 4000K. This has been disputed and the claim was retracted.

Computation also predicts SiC_{2}O_{6} is stable between 7.2 and 42 GPa. Above 86 GPa the carbonate should convert to CO_{4} tetrahedra.

Silicon carbonate is potentially important as a mineral in the mantle of the Earth, as both carbon dioxide and silica are common on Earth.

A molecular silicon dicarbonate complex has also been made. This is made from a stabilised silylone (zeroivalent silicon) which reduces some carbon dioxide to carbon monoxide, but then reacts to form a monomeric silicon dicarbonate.
