= C25H42N7O17P3S =

The molecular formula C_{25}H_{42}N_{7}O_{17}P_{3}S (molar mass: 837.62 g/mol) may refer to:

- Butyryl-CoA
- Isobutyryl-CoA
