= Homolysis =

The term homolysis generally means breakdown (lysis) to equal pieces (homo = same). There are separate meanings for the word in chemistry and biology:

- Homolysis (biology), the fact that the dividing cell gives two equal-size daughter cells
- Homolysis (chemistry), a chemical bond dissociation of a neutral molecule generating two free radicals

== See also ==
- Heterolysis (disambiguation)
