= (3-methyl-2-oxobutanoate dehydrogenase (2-methylpropanoyl-transferring))-phosphatase =

Class of enzymes

Identifiers
- EC no.: 3.1.3.52
- CAS no.: 88086-29-7&title= 87244-20-0, 88086-29-7

Databases
- BRENDA: enzyme data
- ExPASy: NiceZyme view
- KEGG: enzyme entry
- MetaCyc: metabolic pathway
- Rhea: reactions
- PDB structures: RCSB PDB PDBe PDBsum
Search
- PMC: articles
- PubMed: articles
- NCBI: proteins

(3-methyl-2-oxobutanoate dehydrogenase (2-methylpropanoyl-transferring))-phosphatase (EC 3.1.3.52, branched-chain oxo-acid dehydrogenase phosphatase, branched-chain 2-keto acid dehydrogenase phosphatase, branched-chain α-keto acid dehydrogenase phosphatase, BCKDH', [3-methyl-2-oxobutanoate dehydrogenase (lipoamide)]-phosphatase, [3-methyl-2-oxobutanoate dehydrogenase (lipoamide)]-phosphate phosphohydrolase) is an enzyme with systematic name (3-methyl-2-oxobutanoate dehydrogenase (2-methylpropanoyl-transferring))-phosphate phosphohydrolase. This enzyme catalyses the following chemical reaction

[3-methyl-2-oxobutanoate dehydrogenase (2-methylpropanoyl-transferring)] phosphate + H_{2}O $\rightleftharpoons$ [3-methyl-2-oxobutanoate dehydrogenase (2-methylpropanoyl-transferring)] + phosphate

This mitochondrial enzyme is associated with the 3-methyl-2-oxobutanoate dehydrogenase complex.
