= Dihydrolipoyllysine-residue (2-methylpropanoyl)transferase =

dihydrolipoyllysine-residue (2-methylpropanoyl)transferase
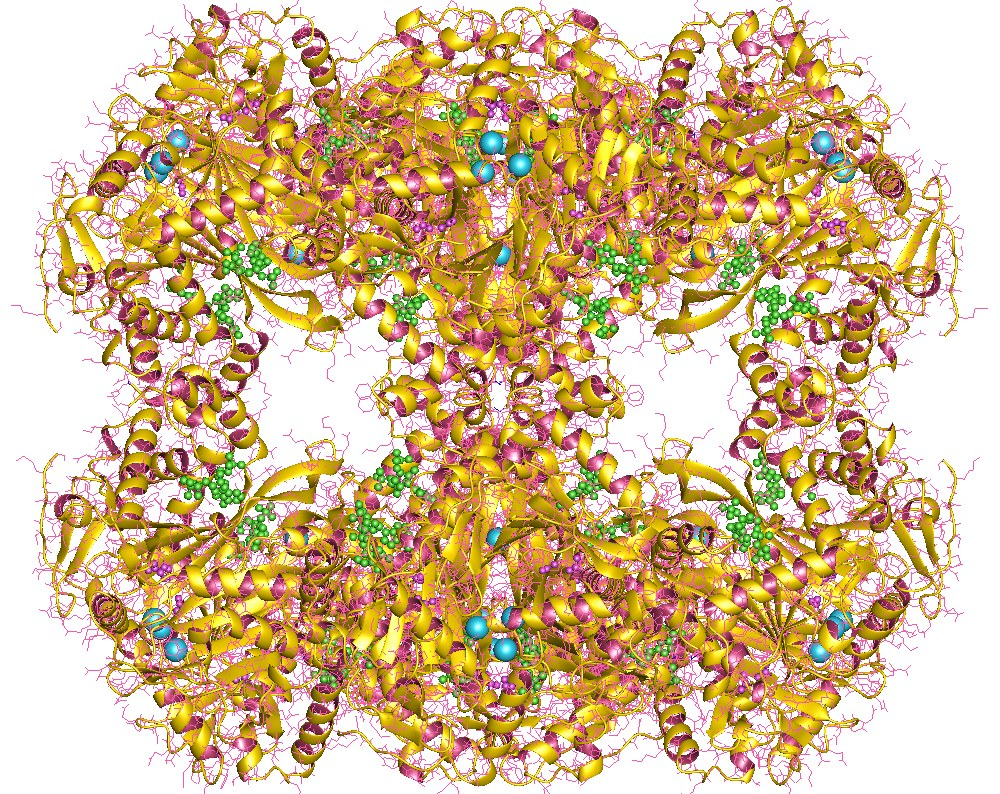

Identifiers
- EC no.: 2.3.1.168

Databases
- IntEnz: IntEnz view
- BRENDA: BRENDA entry
- ExPASy: NiceZyme view
- KEGG: KEGG entry
- MetaCyc: metabolic pathway
- PRIAM: profile
- PDB structures: RCSB PDB PDBe PDBsum
- Gene Ontology: AmiGO / QuickGO
Search
- PMC: articles
- PubMed: articles
- NCBI: proteins

In enzymology, a dihydrolipoyllysine-residue (2-methylpropanoyl)transferase (EC 2.3.1.168) is an enzyme that catalyzes the chemical reaction

2-methylpropanoyl-CoA + enzyme N_{6}-(dihydrolipoyl)lysine $\rightleftharpoons$ CoA + enzyme N_{6}-(S-[2-methylpropanoyl]dihydrolipoyl)lysine

Thus, the two substrates of this enzyme are 2-methylpropanoyl-CoA and enzyme N6-(dihydrolipoyl)lysine, whereas its two products are CoA and [[enzyme N6-(S-[2-methylpropanoyl]dihydrolipoyl)lysine]].

This enzyme belongs to the family of transferases, specifically those acyltransferases transferring groups other than aminoacyl groups. The systematic name of this enzyme class is 2-methylpropanoyl-CoA:enzyme-N6-(dihydrolipoyl)lysine S-(2-methylpropanoyl)transferase. Other names in common use include dihydrolipoyl transacylase, enzyme-dihydrolipoyllysine:2-methylpropanoyl-CoA, S-(2-methylpropanoyl)transferase, 2-methylpropanoyl-CoA:enzyme-6-N-(dihydrolipoyl)lysine, and S-(2-methylpropanoyl)transferase. This enzyme participates in valine, leucine and isoleucine degradation.

== Structural studies ==
As of late 2007, 6 structures have been solved for this class of enzymes, with PDB accession codes 1ZWV, 2COO, 2IHW, 2II3, 2II4, and 2II5.
