= Silylone =

Class of organosilicon compounds

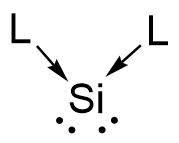
General structure of a silylone.

Silylones are a class of zero-valent monatomic silicon complexes, characterized as having two lone pairs and two donor-acceptor ligand interactions stabilizing a silicon(0) center. Synthesis of silylones generally involves the use of sterically bulky carbenes to stabilize highly reactive Si(0) centers. For this reason, silylones are sometimes referred to siladicarbenes. To date, silylones have been synthesized with cyclic alkyl amino carbenes (cAAC) and bidentate N-heterocyclic carbenes (bis-NHC). They are capable of reactions with a variety of substrates, including chalcogens and carbon dioxide.

== Theoretical predictions ==
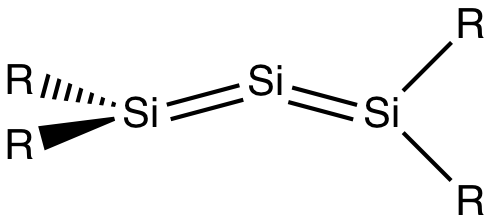
General structure of trisilaallene.

The structure of carbene-stabilized silylones were first predicted using theoretical calculations by Gernot Frenking and coworkers in 2009. Their theoretical study of silylones was inspired from the development and synthesis of carbones: an analogous structure containing carbon(0) stabilized by two donor-acceptor ligand interactions. It was also inspired by previous reports of trisilaallene: a silylene complex featuring a bent geometry about the Si-Si-Si center. The unexpected bent trisilaallene bond angle was dissimilar that of carbon allenes (C=C=C) yet like that of NHC-stabilized carbones. Towards the goal of rationalizing this structure and to investigate silylones in general, the authors analyzed the energetics of di-coordinated model complexes of silicon(0) (L_{2}Si) and carbon(0) (L_{2}C). More specifically, the analysis was conducted using boron trihydride (BH_{3}) binding analysis and proton affinity analysis at the BP86/TZVPP level of theory.

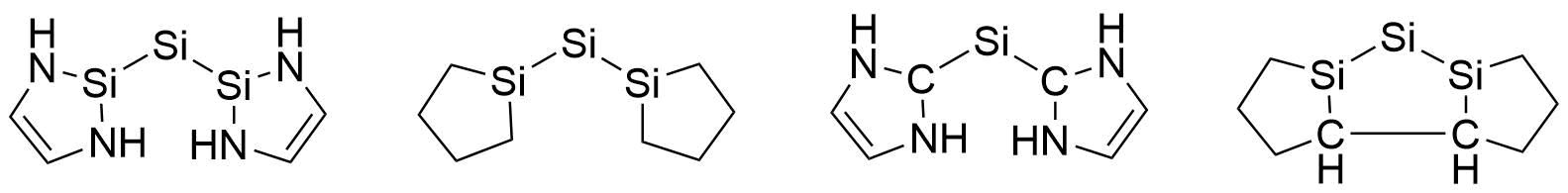
Schematic of theoretically investigated silylones by Takagi et al.

Compared to analogous model complexes of carbon, the silicon complexes displayed very different characteristics. For example, for two of the examined models, the structure of L_{2}C(BH_{3})_{2} could not be energetically minimized whereas it could be for L_{2}Si(BH_{3})_{2}. Both the silicon and carbon model complexes contained two lone pair orbitals: one with σ-orbital character and one with π-orbital character. However, bonding of one of the model complexes with a single BH_{3} occurred at the π-lone pair for the silicon complex and at the σ-lone pair for the carbon complex. As a consequence, the bonding geometries of the resultant complexes differed. High values of the second proton affinity (e.g. PA = 142.9, 129.3, 166.8, and 123.9 kcal/mol) and of the bond dissociation energy (BDE) of the second BH_{3} ligand of di-coordinated BH_{3} complexes (e.g. 26.2, 47.8, 48.1, and 36.6 kcal/mol) were also found. In conjunction with frontier orbital analysis, the high electron density found at the silicon centers suggested that the ligands bonded as donors than covalently. Therefore, the authors claimed that the model complexes were better described as silylones than silylenes. Since high values of the proton affinity were also found for trisilallene, the previously reported complex was also suggested to be a silylone rather than as a silylene. As a result of this analysis, the authors encouraged their exploration by experimentalists.

== cAAC stabilized silylones ==
Cyclic alkyl amino carbene (cAAC) ligands, which generally contain sterically bulky and highly electron-donating ligands, have been utilized to synthesize silylone structures.

=== Synthesis ===
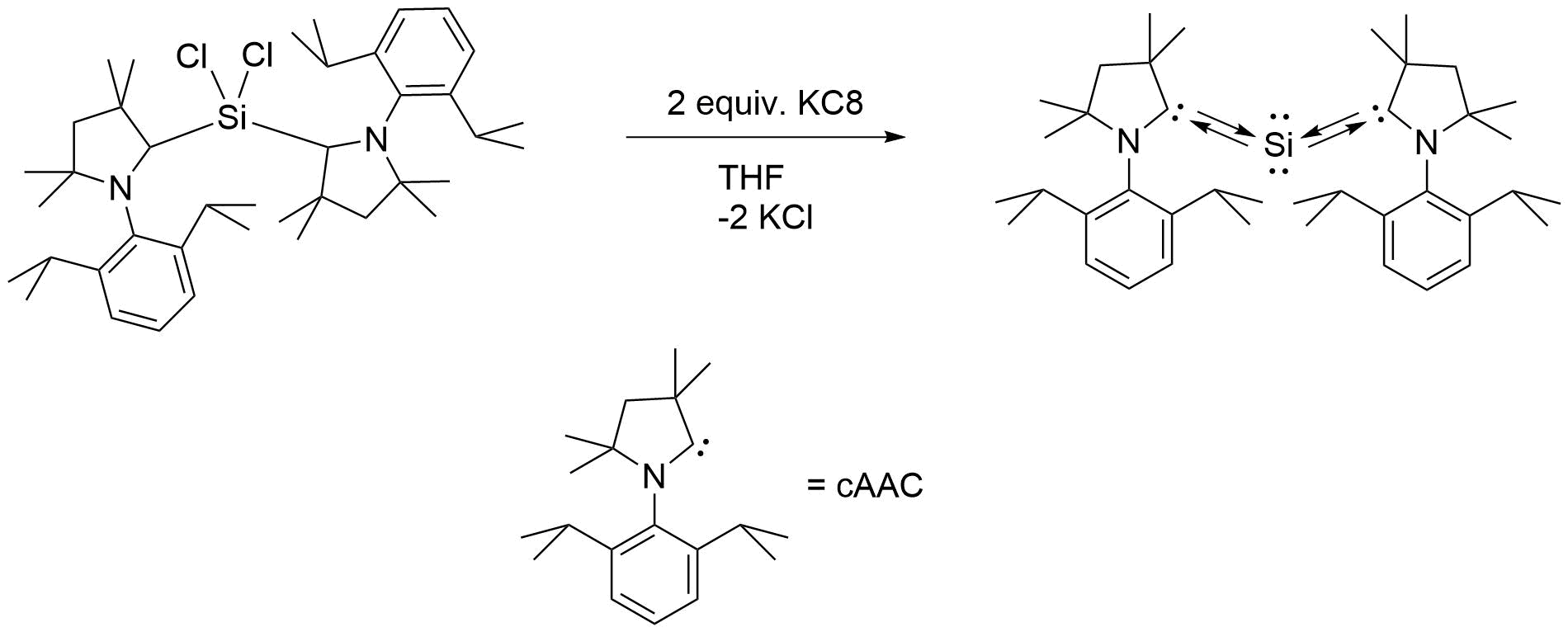
Schematic of cAAC-stabilized silylone synthesis, where the cAAC ligand shown is :C(CH_{2})(CMe_{2})_{2}N-2,6-iPr_{2}C_{6}H_{3}

The first cAAC stabilized silylone was first reported by Mondal et al. in 2013 (where cAAC is ligand used was :C(CH_{2})(CMe_{2})_{2}N-2,6-iPr_{2}C_{6}H_{3}). The complex was synthesized by reduction of (cAAC)_{2}SiCl_{2}, a stable biradical precursor species, with two equivalents of potassium graphite (KC_{8}) reducing agent in tetrahydrofuran (THF) solution. Under this preparation, 95% yield of product was achieved and formed a dark blue solution in hexane with rod-shaped crystals. The crystallized product was found to be stable under inert atmosphere and unreactive towards hydrogen gas, carbon dioxide, and ammonia. Furthermore, they were found to melt at 195 °C and decompose at 220 °C.

=== Structure ===
The identity of Mondal et al.'s cAAC-stabilized silylone was confirmed using a combination of spectroscopic, crystallographic, and computational analysis techniques. Silicon-29 nuclear magnetic resonance spectroscopy (^{29}Si-NMR) revealed a signal at 𝛿_{Si} = 66.71 ppm, while ultraviolet-visible spectroscopy (UV-Vis) showed six absorption bands (λ = 270, 327, 392, 570, and 611 nm). Crystal structure analysis revealed a C-Si-C bond angle of 117.70(8)°, distinguishing it from the previously reported trisilaallene . The Si-C bond lengths were determined to be 1.8411 and 1.8417 Å: similar to Si-C single bonds yet much larger than Si=C double bonds. The authors suggested a singlet ground state for the molecule based on the lack of an observed electron paramagnetic resonance (EPR) signal, in agreement with electronic structure calculations.

Further electronic structure calculations supported the assignment of the structure as a silylone. Analysis of the valence shell charge concentrations (VSCCs) in the non-bonding region of the complex revealed two distinct areas, indicating the presence of two lone pairs on the central Si. Though the structure contains two lone pairs, natural bond orbital (NBO) analysis of the highest-occupied molecular orbital (HOMO) showed that only one is formally non-bonding while the other participates in 3-centered 2-electron π-bonding. The resultant Si-C π-interaction agreed with calculated bond lengths, as well as general understanding of the cAAC ligands as good π-acceptors relative to NHC ligands.

From this, the central silicon atom was proposed to act as a π-electron donor, while the carbene carbons acted as σ-electron donors. Calculation of the first and second proton affinities (PA(1) = 272.2 kcal/mol, PA(2) = 186.7 kcal/mol) of the complex supported the identity of the structure as a Si^{0} silylone than a Si^{II} silylene, particularly due to the large value of the second proton affinity. Finally, Bader charge analysis of the complex agreed with those predicted from NBO analysis.

=== Reactivity ===
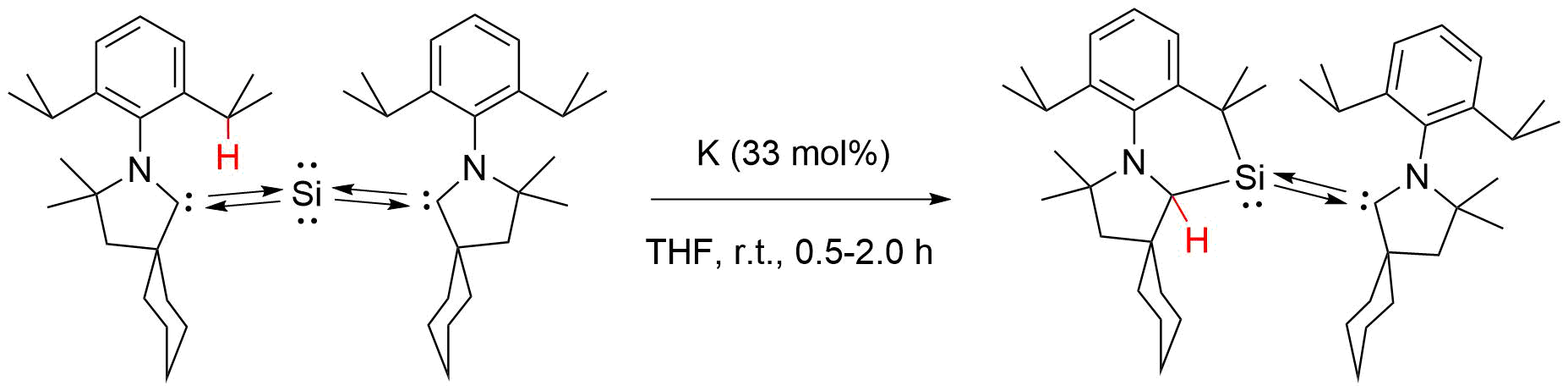
Schematic of cAAC-stabilized silylone conversion to cyclic silylene, with the activated hydrogen atom highlighted in red. The cAAC ligand shown is Cy = :C(CH_{2})(CMe_{2}) (C_{6}H_{10})N-2,6-iPr_{2}C_{6}H_{3}.

In 2014, Roy et al. reported the intermolecular cyclization of a cAAC-stabilized complex with potassium metal reductant in THF through tertiary C-H bond activation (where the cAAC used ligand is :C(CH_{2})(CMe_{2})(C_{6}H_{10})N-2,6-iPr_{2}C_{6}H_{3}). Cyclic voltammetric analysis of the complex showed a quasi-reversible reduction at E_{1/2} = –1.55 V vs. Fc/Fc^{+}_{,} indicating one-reduction at the carbene carbon due to its π-accepting character. The quasi-reverisible nature of the signal suggested that the complex then underwent further chemical rearrangement. Reduction using metallic potassium in THF produced a solution that changed color from dark blue to greenish-yellow over the course of the reaction. The yellow solid product was then isolated with 80% yield.

The product was determined to be a three-coordinate six-membered cyclic silyene: an isomer of the parent silylone. Mass spectroscopy (MS), ^{29}Si-NMR, and carbon-13 NMR (^{13}C-NMR) of the complex verified its identity as an isomer. X-ray single-crystal analysis revealed a trigonal pyramidal geometry with respect to the central silicon and three carbon atoms: this also revealed the presence of a six-membered. Density functional theory (DFT) calculations suggested that the remaining Si-cAAC bond becomes a covalent double bond rather than as a donor-acceptor interaction. In total consideration of the data, the authors propose a mechanism in which an initial one-electron reduction of the carbene carbon is followed by radical activation of the ligand's Me_{2}(Ar)C−H bond to induce Si-C bond formation.

== bis-NHC stabilized silylones ==
bis-N-heterocyclic carbenes have also been used as ligands to stabilize the silicon(0) centers of silylone complexes, with electronic properties different from cAAC-stabilized silylones.

=== Synthesis ===
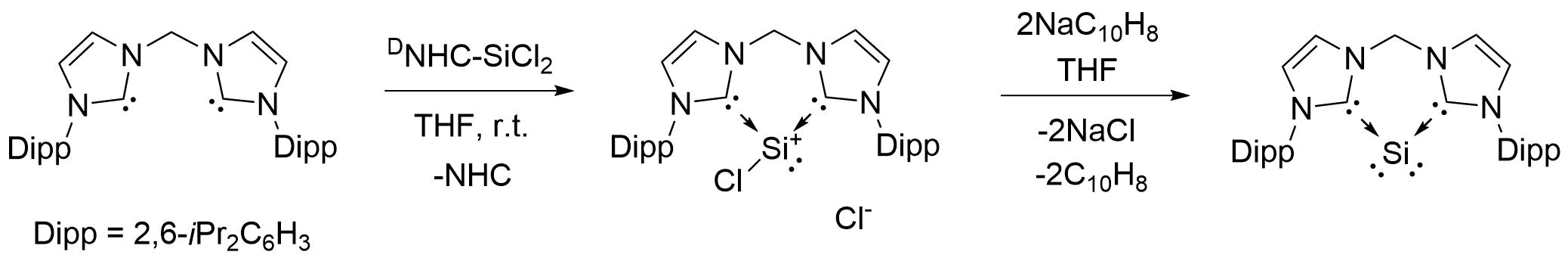
Schematic of bis-NHC stabilized silylone synthesis.

With inspiration from Robinson's seminal NHC-stabilized disilicon(0) complex, the synthesis of bis-NHC stabilized silylones were first reported by Xiong et al. in 2013. The complex is first prepared by the synthesis of a chlorosilyliumylidene precursor complex, which is achieved by ligand exchange of ^{D}NHC->SiCl_{2} with bis-NHC in equimolar amounts in THF. The precursor can then be extracted using acetonitrile in 57% yield, and was structurally characterized by ^{29}Si-NMR, DFT calculations, and crystallgraphic analysis. In particular, DFT revealed HOMO-LUMO similarities to a chlorogermyliumylidene precursor analogue, which was previously successful for forming the analogous bis-NHC stabilized germylone complex. This suggested that the chlorosilyliumylidene would also be successful in forming the silylone complex.

This precursor was then further treated with sodium naphthalide reductant in a 2:1 molar ratio in THF at –60 °C to form the final Si(0) complex with 68% yield. A dark red color change was observed over the course of the reaction, which retained its color when converted into a powder.

=== Structure ===
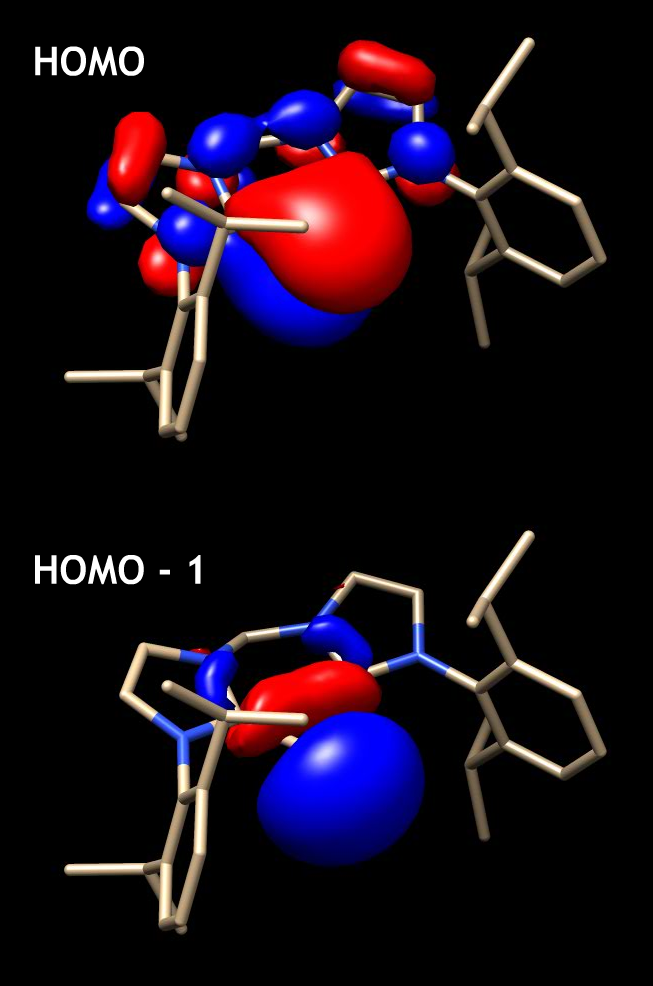
HOMO and HOMO-1 orbitals of bis-NHC stabilized silylone.

Relative to the previously isolated cAAC-stabilized silylone, the bis-NHC stabilized silylone was found to have a more electron-rich Si center. ^{29}Si-NMR of the complex revealed a highly shielded signal at 𝛿 = –80.1 ppm in deuterated benzene. The increased shielding was speculated to be due to the higher σ-donating and weaker π-accepting character of the NHC ligands, as well as the acute 89.1(1)°C-Si-C bond angle. Further calculations of the ^{29}Si shift and NBO charges of the complex supported the interpretation of the NHC ligands as strong sigma donors.

X-ray diffraction (XRD) analysis confirmed the di-coordinate structure of the complex, while also providing insight into its overall geometry. The C_{3}N_{2}Si ring was found to exist in a puckered conformation, with a trigonal planar C-Si-C arrangement. The Si-C bond lengths were found to be 1.864 Å and 1.874 Å and thus asymmetrical . The shortened bonds were also verified from DFT calculations, wherein the HOMO shows π-electron delocalization from the silicon lone pair into the carbene ring. UV-Vis analysis of the complex in toluene shows four absorption maxima, the λ = 547 nm (ɛ = 7.5 × 10^{3}) maxima of which was assigned to be the HOMO-LUMO transition via DFT calculations.

High values of the proton affinity of the complex (281.7 kcal/mol and 189.4 kcal/mol) suggested that the ligands interact with the silicon center datively rather covalently, consistent with prior electronic structure analysis. Furthermore, it was found to have even stronger donor-acceptor interactions than the cAAC-stabilized analogue. Yet, similar to the cAAC stabilized complex, the orbital character of the lone pairs was found to be asymmetric. One lone pair was found to reside in an orbital with σ-type character, while the other in an orbital with π-orbital-type character. The HOMO-1 of the complex depicts the residence of the s-type lone pair.

=== Reactivity ===
==== Lewis acids ====
bis-NHC stabilized silylones were found to react in a one- and two-fold fashion with Lewis acids. Xiong et al. reported the formation of the monomeric complex (bis-NHC)Si(GaCl_{3}) from addition of the Lewis acidic GaCl_{3} in THF. X-ray diffraction analysis revealed a C-Si-C bond angle of 88.59(9)° similar to that of the parent silylone, though ^{29}Si{^{1}H}-NMR revealed larger upfield signal (𝛿_{si} = –119.0 ppm). Yao et al. also reported the reactivity of the silylone with two equivalents of ZnCl_{2} in THF to form colorless crystals of (bis-NHC)Si(ZnCl_{2})_{2}. The coordination environment of this complex was observed to be tetrahedral around the silicon by XRD. However, the ZnCl_{2} was shown to be asymmetrically coordinated, where one is trigonal planar and the other tetrahedral as a result of additional coordination with a molecule of THF.

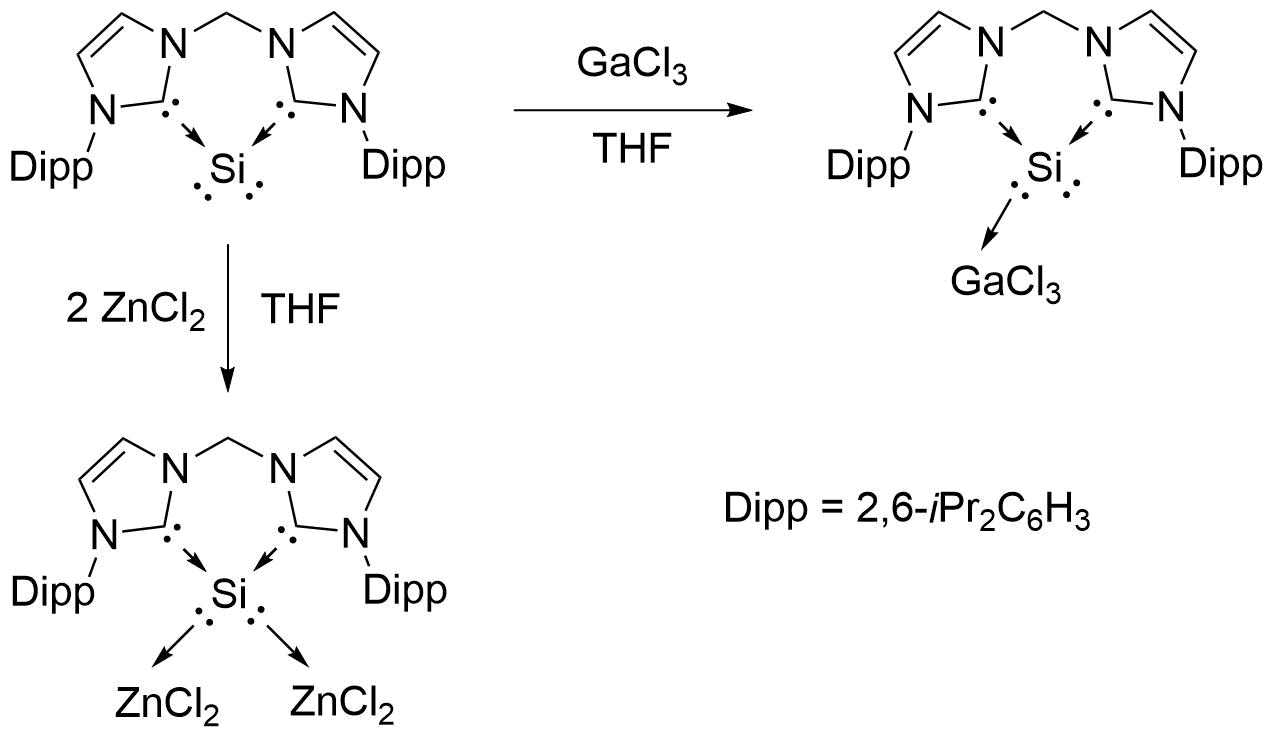
Reaction schematic of bis-NHC stabilized silylone with Lewis acids to form adducts.

These species were also found to act as a reducing agents, as demonstrated by their ability to reduce GeCl_{2}(dioxane) to Ge^{0} and NHC->SiCl_{2} to form Si^{0} and dinuclear silicon.

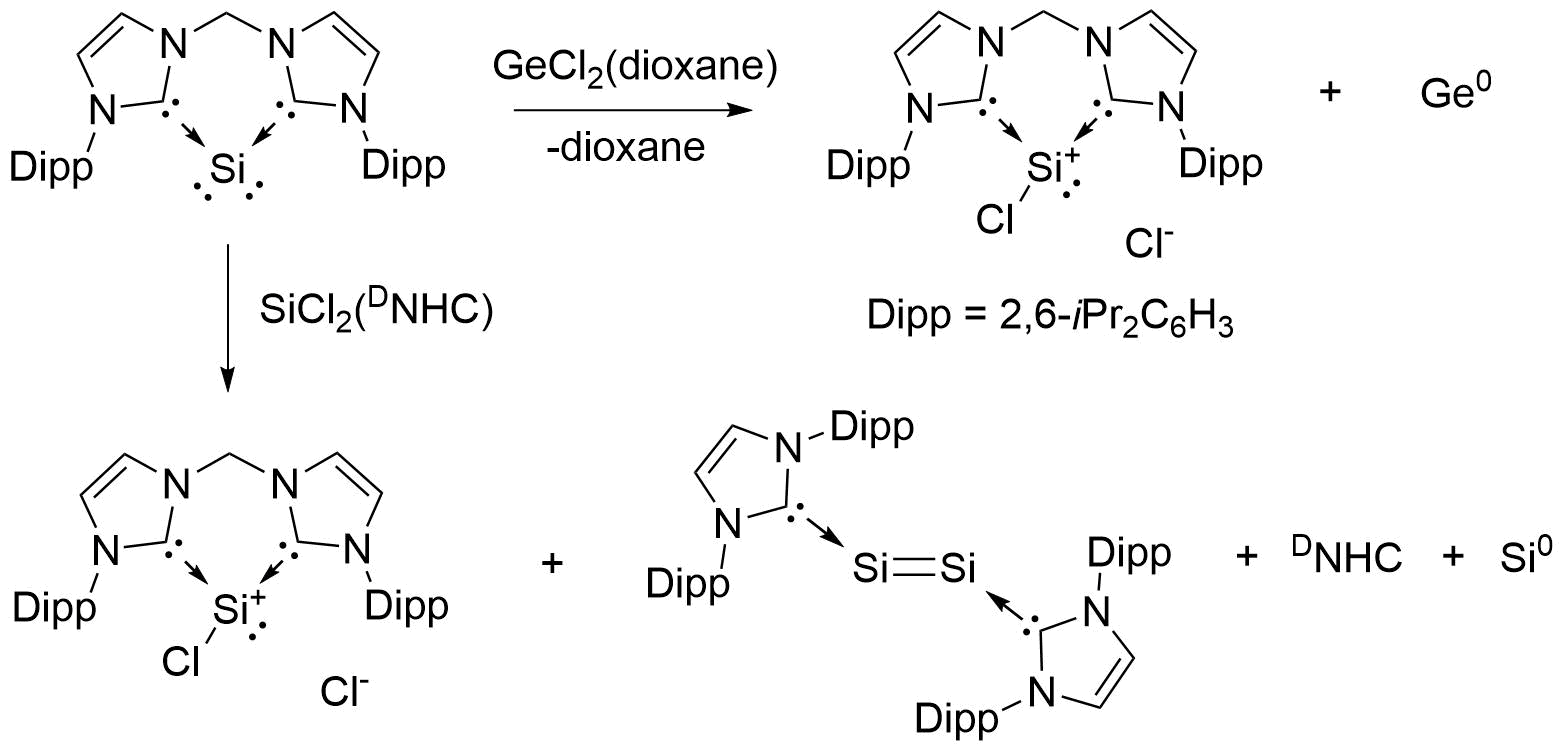
Schematic of silylone-activated reduction of silicon and germanium complexes.

==== Chalcogenides ====
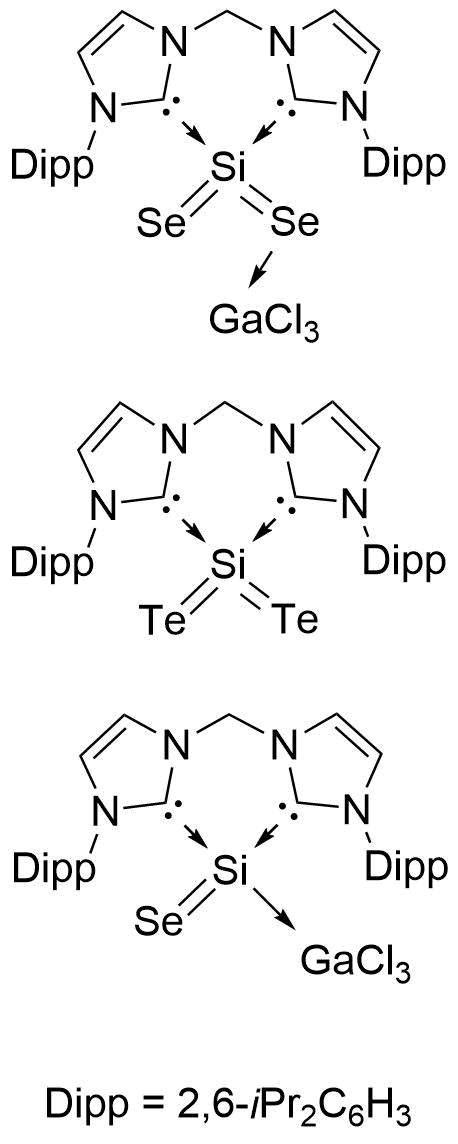
Structures of other chalcogenide-ligated silicon complexes.

bis-NHC stabilized silylones have also been found to react with chalcogens to form silicon(II) monochalcogenides and silicon(IV) dichalcogenides. For example, reaction of the complex with elemental sulfur resulted in a disulfide complex, which appearing as a colorless powder in 89% yield.

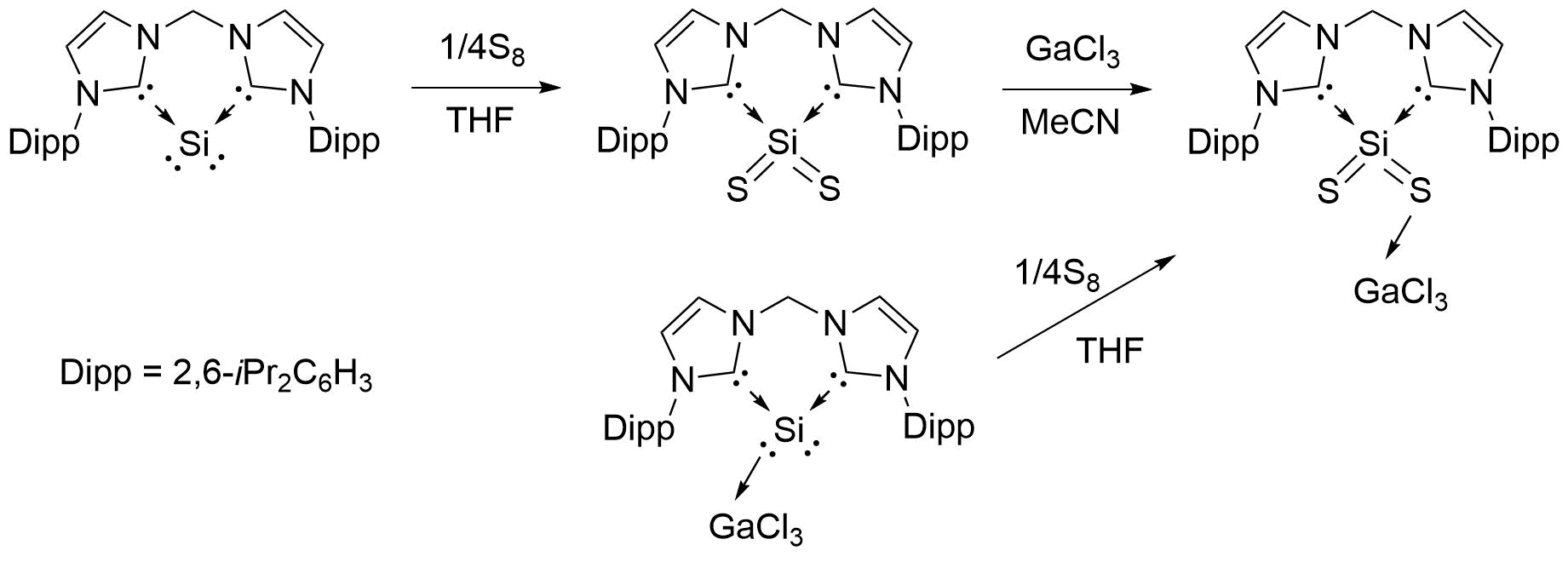
Schematic of the synthesis of chalcogenide-ligated silicon complexes from bis-NHC-stabilized silylones.

The structure of the disulfide complex was characterized using high-resolution electrospray ionization mass spectrometry (HR-ESI-MS, m/z = 5.6125220) and solid state ^{29}Si{^{1}H} NMR (𝛿_{Si} = –32.5 ppm). Natural resonance theory (NRT) analysis revealed symmetric Si-S single bonds that are semi-polar in character. Minor resonance contributions show a structure in which one Si-S contains no bonding while the other double bonding resulting from π-interactions with the Si center.

The complex was found to retain Lewis basic properties despite not being a Si(0) complex. For example, the disulfur complex can then form an adduct with GaCl_{3}. XRD analysis of this GaCl_{3}-coordinated structure revealed asymmetric Si-S bond lengths of 2.106(2) Å and 2.006(2) Å and a S-Si-S bond angle of 115.03(8)°. The weight of the aforementioned no-bond/double-bonding resonance was enhanced under addition of the GaCl_{3} adduct into the model, in expectation with one of the sulfides acting as an electron donor.

Other chalcogenide structures have also been synthesized. Reaction of (bis-NHC)Si(GaCl_{3}) with selenium can produce the monochalcogenide (bis-NHC)SiSe(GaCl_{3}). Dichalcogenide analogues with Se and Te can also be synthesized, whose structures were confirmed using ^{29}Si{^{1}H}-NMR, infrared spectroscopy (IR), MS, and single-crystal X-ray diffraction. NRT analysis of the SiSe_{2} and SiTe_{2} complexes reveals a predominance of the resonance form containing a single Si-X (X = Se, Te) bond with semi-polar character, similar to that of the SiS_{2} structure

==== Carbon dioxide ====
Activation of carbon dioxide by bis-NHC stabilized silylones was first reported by Burchert et al. in 2017. The reaction was achieved by exposing a cooled solution of the silylone at –30 °C in THF to carbon dioxide, from which colorless crystals formed over the course of four days. The crystals were then isolated as a white solid in 75% yield. The dicarboxylated reaction product (bis-NHC)Si(CO_{3})_{2} was isolated and characterized using IR (ν_{CO} = 1746 cm^{−1}) and ^{29}Si{^{1}H}-NMR (𝛿_{Si} = 55.98 ppm). Crystallographic analysis of the complex revealed a Si^{IV} center coordinated by two carbonate ligands in a distorted octahedral geometry. Carbon monoxide was also verified as a reaction product by means of carbon-13 NMR analysis using ^{13}CO_{2} as a reactant. Using DFT analysis, the authors proposed a reaction mechanism involving the formation two successive silicon-oxo bonds, which was calculated to be a favorable reaction pathway under the given reaction conditions.

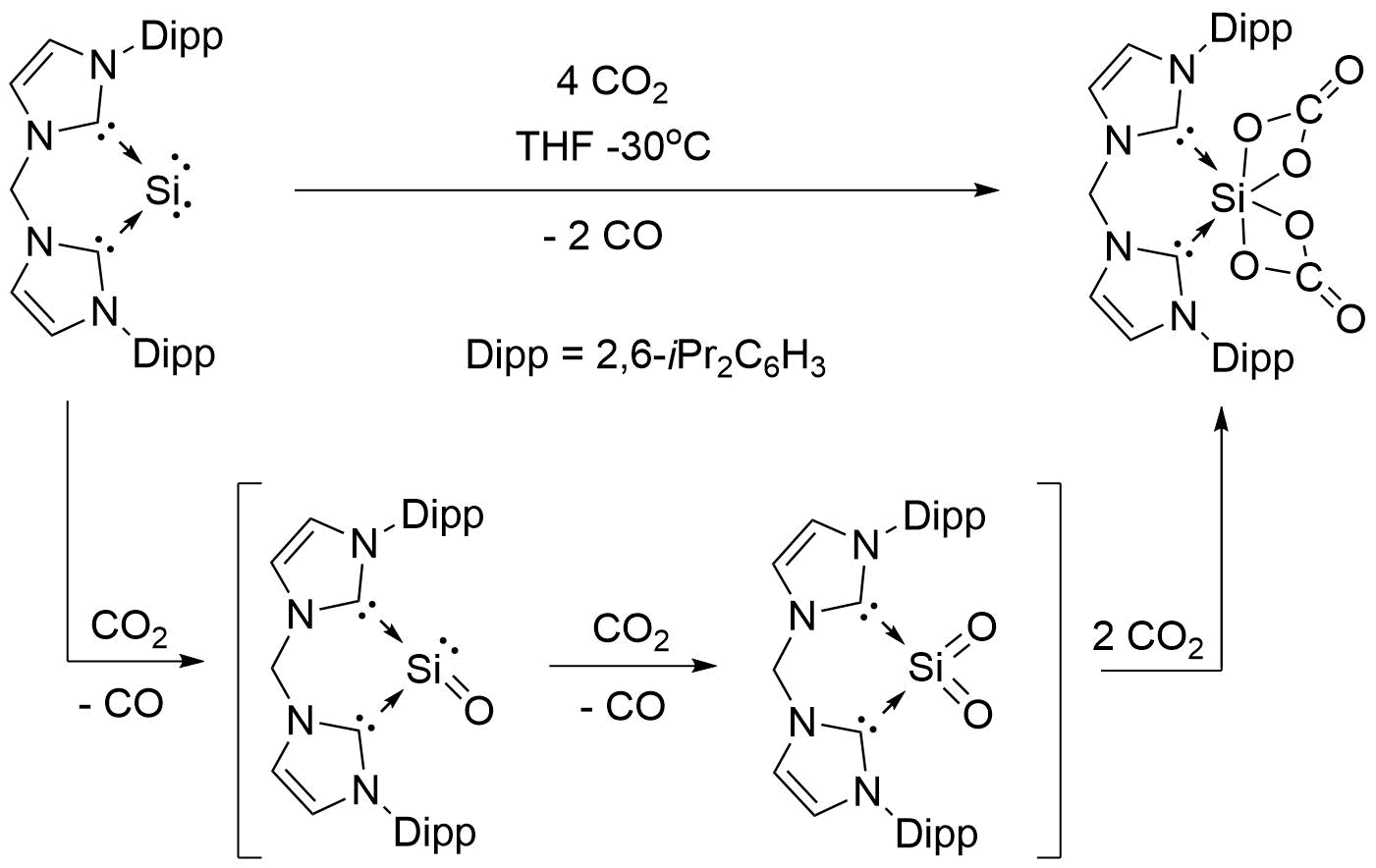
Schematic of CO_{2} activation using bis-NHC-stabilized silylone.
