= Butyrylation =

Post-translational modification

Schematic of histone acylation types, including butyrylation.

Butyrylation is a post-translational modification (PTM) of proteins in which a butyryl group is added to an amino acid, specifically lysine residues. It is a form of PTM known as protein acylation, and occurs primarily on histones, the proteins around which DNA molecules wind to form tighly packed nucleosomes. Nucleosomes may further condense into heterochromatin, making it less susceptible to damage as well as less available to transcription. Therefore, histone acylation in general is considered in an important regulator of gene expression.

Histone lysin butyrylation was discovered in 2007 alongside another acylation, lysine propionylation. It is currently considered exclusive to eukaryotes. Lysine propionylation was later identified outside of histone proteins in eukaryotic cells, including p53, EP300, and CREB binding-protein.
