= ACAD8 =

Protein-coding gene in the species Homo sapiens

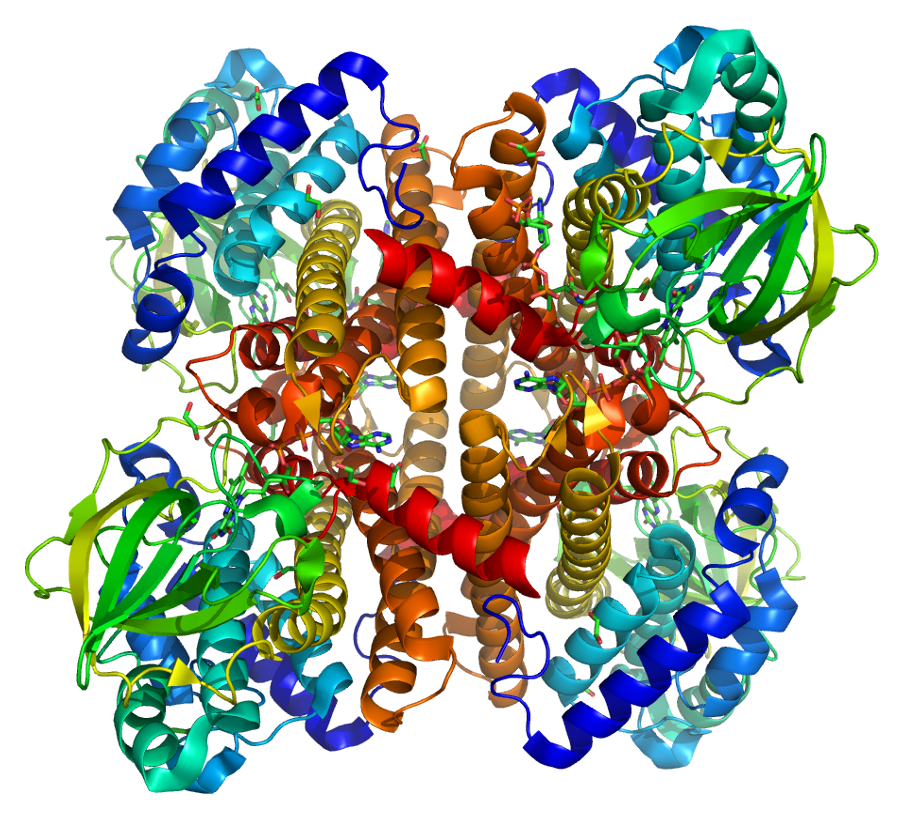

Identifiers
- Aliases: ACAD8, ACAD-8, ARC42, acyl-CoA dehydrogenase family member 8, IBDH
- External IDs: OMIM: 604773; MGI: 1914198; GeneCards: ACAD8
Available structures
PDB	Ortholog search: PDBe RCSB
PDB	List of PDB id codes 1RX0
Enzyme activity
EC #	BRENDA	ExPASy	KEGG	MetaCyc
1.3.8.5	↗	↗	↗	↗

Gene location (Human)
Chr.	Chromosome 11 (human)
Band	11q25	Start	134,253,548 bp
Band	11q25	End	134,265,855 bp

Gene location (Mouse)
Chr.	Chromosome 9 (mouse)
Band	9|9 A4	Start	26,885,431 bp
Band	9|9 A4	End	26,910,862 bp
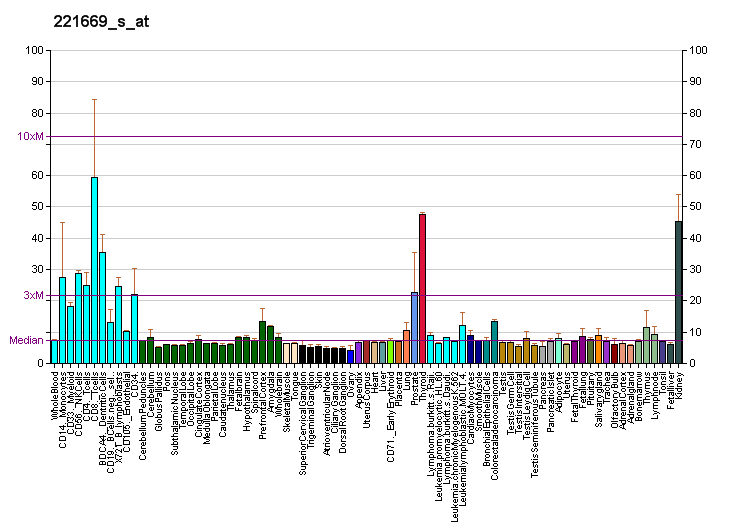
RNA expression pattern
Bgee	Human / Mouse (ortholog); Top expressed in: right lobe of thyroid gland; left lobe of thyroid gland; cerebellar hemisphere; body of pancreas; right hemisphere of cerebellum; apex of heart; skin of leg; skin of abdomen; right frontal lobe; right lobe of liver / Top expressed in: right kidney; Epithelium of choroid plexus; proximal tubule; neural layer of retina; muscle of thigh; granulocyte; left lobe of liver; human kidney; morula; spermatocyte; More reference expression data
BioGPS	More reference expression data
Gene ontology
Molecular function	oxidoreductase activity, acting on the CH-CH group of donors; oxidoreductase activity; acyl-CoA dehydrogenase activity; flavin adenine dinucleotide binding
Cellular component	mitochondrial matrix; mitochondrion
Biological process	valine catabolic process; branched-chain amino acid catabolic process; regulation of transcription, DNA-templated; transcription, DNA-templated; lipid metabolism
Sources:Amigo / QuickGO
Orthologs
Databases	NCBI: entry; OMA: entry
Species	Human	Mouse
Entrez	27034	66948
Ensembl	ENSG00000151498	ENSMUSG00000031969
UniProt	Q9UKU7	Q9D7B6
RefSeq (mRNA)	NM_014384	NM_025862
RefSeq (protein)	NP_055199	NP_080138
Location (UCSC)	Chr 11: 134.25 – 134.27 Mb	Chr 9: 26.89 – 26.91 Mb
PubMed search
- Wikidata
View/Edit Human	View/Edit Mouse

Isobutyryl-CoA dehydrogenase, mitochondrial is an enzyme that in humans is encoded by the ACAD8 gene on chromosome 11.

The protein encoded by ACAD8 is a mitochondrial protein belongs to the acyl-CoA dehydrogenase family of enzymes, which function to catalyze the dehydrogenation of acyl-CoA derivatives in the metabolism of fatty acids or branched-chain amino acids. ACAD8 functions in catabolism of the branched-chain amino acid valine.

== Structure ==
ACAD8 functions as a homotetramer and has an overall structure is similar to other acyl-CoA dehydrogenases. The functional protein contains an NH2-terminal alpha-helical domain, a medial beta-strand domain and a C-terminal alpha-helical domain.

== Clinical significance ==
Mutations in ACAD8 have been linked to isobutyryl-CoA dehydrogenase deficiency. Most patients with isobutyryl-CoA dehydrogenase deficiency are asymptotic, but children have also been observed to develop dilated cardiomyopathy.

== Function ==
ACAD8 is an isobutyryl-CoA dehydrogenase that functions in the catabolism of branched-chain amino acids including valine, and shows high reactivity toward isobutyryl-CoA. ACAD8 is responsible for the third step in the breakdown of valine and converts isobutyryl-CoA into methylacrylyl-CoA.
