= Heterolysis (chemistry) =

Breaking a molecular bond such that both electrons remain with one species

In chemistry, heterolysis or heterolytic fission (from Greek ἕτερος (heteros) 'different' and λύσις (lusis) 'loosening') is the process of cleaving/breaking a covalent bond where one previously bonded species takes both original bonding electrons from the other species. During heterolytic bond cleavage of a neutral molecule, a cation and an anion will be generated. Most commonly the more electronegative atom keeps the pair of electrons becoming anionic while the more electropositive atom becomes cationic.

Heterolytic fission almost always happens to single bonds; the process usually produces two fragment species.

The energy required to break the bond is called the heterolytic bond dissociation energy, which is similar (but not equivalent) to homolytic bond dissociation energy commonly used to represent the energy value of a bond.

One example of the differences in the energies is the energy required to break a H−H bond

$\ce{H2 -> 2H.}$	ΔH = 104 kcal/mol
$\ce{H2 -> H+ + H-}$	ΔH = 66 kcal/mol (in water)

== History ==
The discovery and categorization of heterolytic bond fission was clearly dependent on the discovery and categorization of the chemical bond.

In 1916, chemist Gilbert N. Lewis developed the concept of the electron-pair bond, in which two atoms share one to six electrons, thus forming the single electron bond, a single bond, a double bond, or a triple bond. This became the model for a covalent bond.

In 1932 Linus Pauling first proposed the concept of electronegativity, which also introduced the idea that electrons in a covalent bond may not be shared evenly between the bonded atoms.

However, the ions had been studied before bonds mainly by Svante Arrhenius in his 1884 dissertation. Arrhenius pioneered development of ionic theory and proposed definitions for acids as molecules that produced hydrogen ions, and bases as molecules that produced hydroxide ions.

== Solvation effects ==
The rate of reaction for many reactions involving unimolecular heterolysis depends heavily on rate of ionization of the covalent bond. The limiting reaction step is generally the formation of ion pairs. One group in Ukraine did an in-depth study on the role of nucleophilic solvation and its effect on the mechanism of bond heterolysis. They found that the rate of heterolysis depends strongly on the nature of the solvent.

For example, a change of reaction medium from hexane to water increases the rate of tert-Butyl chloride (t-BuCl) heterolysis by 14 orders of magnitude. This is caused by very strong solvation of the transition state. The main factors that affect heterolysis rates are mainly the solvent's polarity and electrophilic as well as its ionizing power. The polarizability, nucleophilicity and cohesion of the solvent had a much weaker effect on heterolysis.

However, there is some debate on effects of the nucleophilicity of the solvent, some papers claim it has no effect, while some papers claim that more nucleophilic solvents decrease the reaction rate.

== See also ==
- Homolysis (chemistry)
- Bond dissociation energy
