= 2-oxoisovalerate dehydrogenase (acylating) =

Class of enzymes

Identifiers
- EC no.: 1.2.1.25
- CAS no.: 37211-61-3

Databases
- IntEnz: IntEnz view
- BRENDA: BRENDA entry
- ExPASy: NiceZyme view
- KEGG: KEGG entry
- MetaCyc: metabolic pathway
- PRIAM: profile
- PDB structures: RCSB PDB PDBe PDBsum
- Gene Ontology: AmiGO / QuickGO
Search
- PMC: articles
- PubMed: articles
- NCBI: proteins

In enzymology, 2-oxoisovalerate dehydrogenase (acylating) (EC 1.2.1.25) is an enzyme that catalyzes the chemical reaction

α-Ketoisovaleric acid
+ CoA + NAD^{+}
CO_{2} + H^{+}
CO_{2} + H^{+}
Isobutyryl-CoA
+ NADH

The three substrates of this enzyme are α-ketoisovaleric acid, coenzyme A (CoA), and oxidised nicotinamide adenine dinucleotide (NAD^{+}). Its products are isobutyryl-CoA, carbon dioxide, reduced NADH and a proton.

This enzyme belongs to the family of oxidoreductases, specifically those acting on the aldehyde or oxo group of donor with NAD+ or NADP+ as acceptor. The systematic name of this enzyme class is 3-methyl-2-oxobutanoate:NAD+ 2-oxidoreductase (CoA-methyl-propanoylating). Other names in common use include 2-oxoisovalerate dehydrogenase, and alpha-ketoisovalerate dehydrogenase. This enzyme participates in valine, leucine and isoleucine degradation.
