= 3-methyl-2-oxobutanoate dehydrogenase =

Class of enzymes

3-methyl-2-oxobutanoate dehydrogenase (2-methylpropanoyl-transferring)
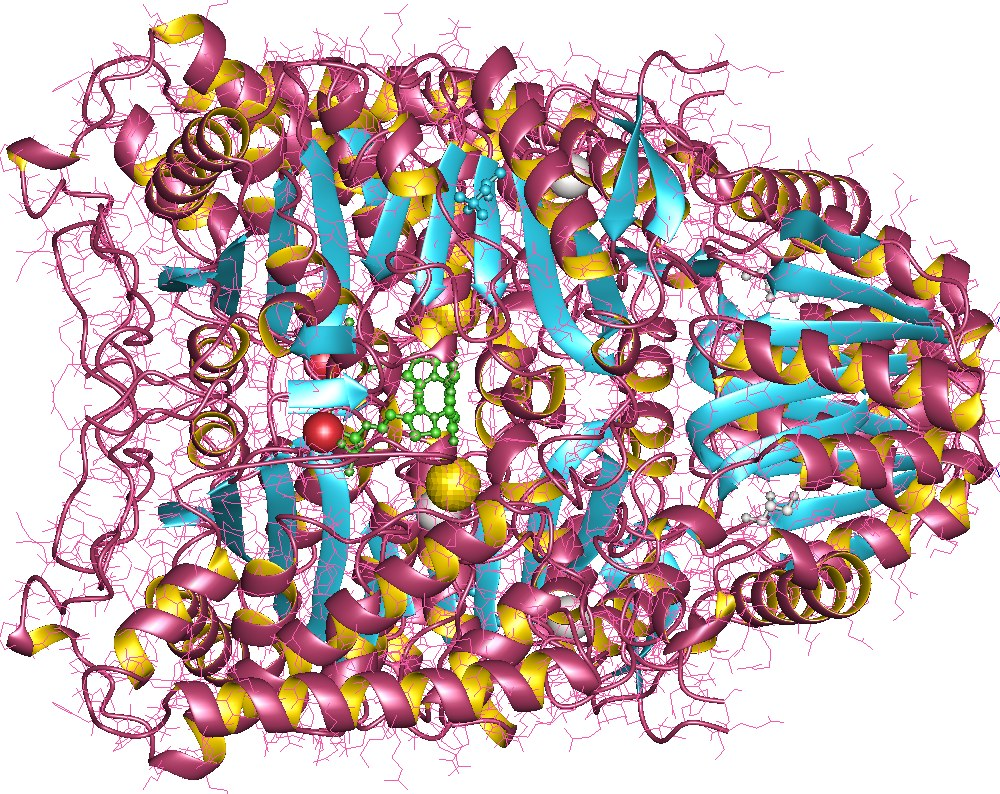
- 2-oxoisovalerate dehydrogenase heterotetramer, Human

Identifiers
- EC no.: 1.2.4.4
- CAS no.: 9082-72-8

Databases
- BRENDA: enzyme data
- ExPASy: NiceZyme view
- KEGG: enzyme entry
- MetaCyc: metabolic pathway
- Rhea: reactions
- PDB structures: RCSB PDB PDBe PDBsum
- Gene Ontology: AmiGO / QuickGO
Search
- PMC: articles
- PubMed: articles
- NCBI: proteins

In enzymology, a 3-methyl-2-oxobutanoate dehydrogenase (EC 1.2.4.4) is an enzyme that catalyzes the chemical reaction

3-methyl-2-oxobutanoate + [dihydrolipoyllysine-residue (2-methylpropanoyl)transferase] lipoyllysine $\rightleftharpoons$ [dihydrolipoyllysine-residue (2-methylpropanoyl)transferase] S-(2-methylpropanoyl)dihydrolipoyllysine + CO_{2}

The 3 substrates of this enzyme are 3-methyl-2-oxobutanoate, dihydrolipoyllysine-residue (2-methylpropanoyl)transferase, and lipoyllysine, whereas its 3 products are dihydrolipoyllysine-residue (2-methylpropanoyl)transferase, S-(2-methylpropanoyl)dihydrolipoyllysine, and CO_{2}.

This enzyme belongs to the family of oxidoreductases, specifically those acting on the aldehyde or oxo group of donor with a disulfide as acceptor.

This enzyme participates in valine, leucine and isoleucine degradation. It employs one cofactor, thiamin diphosphate. It is the E1 subunit of a catalytic complex.

== Structural studies ==
As of late 2007, twenty-nine structures have been solved for this class of enzymes, with PDB accession codes PDB: 1DTW, PDB: 1OLS, PDB: 1OLU, PDB: 1OLX, PDB: 1U5B, PDB: 1UM9, PDB: 1UMB, PDB: 1UMC, PDB: 1UMD, PDB: 1V11, PDB: 1V16, PDB: 1V1M, PDB: 1V1R, PDB: 1WCI, PDB: 1X7W, PDB: 1X7X, PDB: 1X7Y, PDB: 1X7Z, PDB: 1X80, PDB: 2BEU, PDB: 2BEV, PDB: 2BEW, PDB: 2BFB, PDB: 2BFC, PDB: 2BFD, PDB: 2BFE, PDB: 2BFF, PDB: 2BP7, and PDB: 2J9F.
