= Heterolysis (biology) =

Heterolysis (hetero = other/different, lysis = cell breakdown) is the spontaneous death and disintegration of a cell from factors other than itself. In contrast, autolysis happens when a cell dies due to its own secretions or signaling. Some external factors that cause heterolysis are hypoxia, biological factors, chemical agents like drugs or free radical reactions, physical factors like electric shock, trauma, extreme radiation, and immunological reactions such as inflammation or allergic reactions. Such extrinsic cell death is important in executing proper immune response functions. This is commonly seen when a bacterial or viral infection occurs and the pathogen forces the cell to stop apoptosis to avoid death of host cells. In such scenarios, heterolytic factors make it possible to combat infections by lysing the infected cells.
