= Propionylation =

Post-translational modification

Schematic of histone acylation types, including propionylation.

Propionylation is a post-translational modification of proteins, in which a propionyl-group is added to a lysine amino acid of a protein. Propionylation participates in crucial biological processes, including metabolic processes and cellular stress response.

Lysine propionylation was first identified on histone proteins, and since has also been identified on other proteins. Histone propionylation is a mark of active chromatin. The substrate for protein propionylation is propionyl-CoA. Propionyl-CoA in the cell is metabolised by the enzyme propionyl-CoA carboxylase. Accumulation of propionyl-CoA leads to increased protein propionylation.

In patients with propionic acidemia, a rare autosomal recessive metabolic disorder, propionyl-CoA levels elevated and increased propionylation, which might contribute to the pathology in these patients.
