= Isobutyryl-CoA =

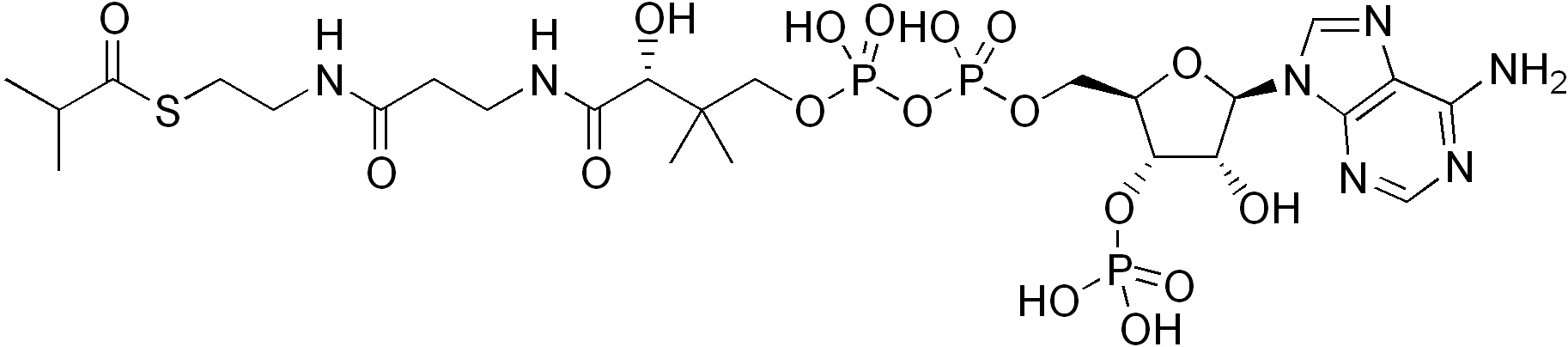

Names
- IUPAC name 3′-O-Phosphonoadenosine 5′-[(3R)-3-hydroxy-2,2-dimethyl-4-{[3-({2-[(2-methylpropanoyl)sulfanyl]ethyl}amino)-3-oxopropyl]amino}-4-oxobutyl dihydrogen diphosphate]
- Systematic IUPAC name O^{1}-{[(2R,3S,4R,5R)-5-(6-Amino-9H-purin-9-yl)-4-hydroxy-3-(phosphonooxy)oxolan-2-yl]methyl} O^{3}-[(3R)-3-hydroxy-2,2-dimethyl-4-{[3-({2-[(2-methylpropanoyl)sulfanyl]ethyl}amino)-3-oxopropyl]amino}-4-oxobutyl] dihydrogen diphosphate
- Other names Isobutyryl-coenzyme A

Identifiers
| CAS Number | 15621-60-0 |
| 3D model (JSmol) | Interactive image |
| ChEBI | CHEBI:15479 |
| ChemSpider | 786 |
| KEGG | C00630 |
| MeSH | Isobutyryl-coenzyme+A |
| PubChem CID | 808 |
| CompTox Dashboard (EPA) | DTXSID00864609 |
- InChI: InChI=1S/C25H42N7O17P3S/c1-13(2)24(37)53-8-7-27-15(33)5-6-28-22(36)19(35)25(3,4)10-46-52(43,44)49-51(41,42)45-9-14-18(48-50(38,39)40)17(34)23(47-14)32-12-31-16-20(26)29-11-30-21(16)32/h11-14,17-19,23,34-35H,5-10H2,1-4H3,(H,27,33)(H,28,36)(H,41,42)(H,43,44)(H2,26,29,30)(H2,38,39,40)/t14-,17-,18-,19+,23-/m1/s1 Key: AEWHYWSPVRZHCT-NDZSKPAWSA-N
- SMILES: CC(C)C(=O)SCCNC(=O)CCNC(=O)C(C(C)(C)COP(=O)(O)OP(=O)(O)OCC1C(C(C(O1)N2C=NC3=C2N=CN=C3N)O)OP(=O)(O)O)O

Properties
| Chemical formula | C_{25}H_{42}N_{7}O_{17}P_{3}S |
| Molar mass | 837.62 g/mol |
- Except where otherwise noted, data are given for materials in their standard state (at 25 °C [77 °F], 100 kPa). verify (what is ?) Infobox references

Isobutyryl-coenzyme A is a necessary cofactor required for Polyketide synthase (PKS) enzyme(s), to catalyze the a,b-dehydrogenation of acyl-CoA esters to make many natural products via Polyketide synthase (PKS) assembly lines, as well as PKS-NRPS hybrid assembly lines. The resulting products comprise antibiotics and other bioactive molecules. Notably, isobutyryl-coenzyme A is also an intermediate in the metabolism of the amino acid valine, and it is structurally similar to intermediates in the catabolism of other small amino acids.

Defective Isobutyryl-coenzyme A, produced by the body, often results in a metabolic disease.

== Biosynthesis ==
The enzyme 2-oxoisovalerate dehydrogenase (acylating) produces isobutyryl-CoA from α-ketoisovaleric acid.

α-Ketoisovaleric acid
+ CoA + NAD^{+}
CO_{2} + H^{+}
CO_{2} + H^{+}
Isobutyryl-CoA
+ NADH

The substrates of the enzyme are α-ketoisovaleric acid, coenzyme A (CoA), and oxidised nicotinamide adenine dinucleotide (NAD^{+}). Its products are isobutyryl-CoA, carbon dioxide, reduced NADH and a proton.

== See also ==
- Isobutyryl-CoA mutase
- Isobutyryl-coenzyme A dehydrogenase deficiency
