= Bond dissociation energy =

Standard enthalpy change when a chemical bond is cleaved by homolysis

The bond dissociation energy (BDE, D_{0}, or DH°) is one measure of the strength of a chemical bond A−B. It can be defined as the standard enthalpy change when A−B is cleaved by homolysis to give fragments A and B, which are usually radical species. The enthalpy change is temperature-dependent, and the bond dissociation energy is often defined to be the enthalpy change of the homolysis at 0 K (absolute zero), although the enthalpy change at 298 K (standard conditions) is also a frequently encountered parameter.

As a typical example, the bond dissociation energy for one of the C−H bonds in ethane (C_{2}H_{6}) is defined as the standard enthalpy change of the process

CH_{3}CH_{2}−H → CH_{3}CH_{2}• + H•,
DH°_{298}(CH_{3}CH_{2}−H) = ΔH° = 101.1(4) kcal/mol = 423.0 ± 1.7 kJ·mol⁻¹ = 4.40(2) eV (per bond).

To convert a molar BDE to the energy needed to dissociate the bond per molecule, the conversion factor 23.060 kcal/mol (96.485 kJ/mol) for each eV can be used.

A variety of experimental techniques, including spectrometric determination of energy levels, generation of radicals by pyrolysis or photolysis, measurements of chemical kinetics and equilibrium, and various calorimetric and electrochemical methods have been used to measure bond dissociation energy values. Nevertheless, bond dissociation energy measurements are challenging and are subject to considerable error. The majority of currently known values are accurate to within ±1 or 2 kcal/mol (4–10 kJ·mol⁻¹). Moreover, values measured in the past, especially before the 1970s, can be especially unreliable and have been subject to revisions on the order of 10 kcal/mol (e.g., benzene C–H bonds, from 103 kcal/mol in 1965 to the modern accepted value of 112.9(5) kcal/mol). Even in modern times (between 1990 and 2004), the O−H bond of phenol has been reported to be anywhere from 85.8 to 91.0 kcal/mol. On the other hand, the bond dissociation energy of H_{2} at 298 K has been measured to high precision and accuracy: DH°_{298}(H−H) = 104.1539(1) kcal/mol or 435.780 kJ·mol⁻¹.

== Definitions and related parameters ==
The term bond dissociation energy is similar to the related notion of bond dissociation enthalpy (or bond enthalpy), which is sometimes used interchangeably. However, some authors make the distinction that the bond dissociation energy (D_{0}) refers to the enthalpy change at 0 K, while the term bond dissociation enthalpy is used for the enthalpy change at 298 K (unambiguously denoted DH°_{298}). The former parameter tends to be favored in theoretical and computational work, while the latter is more convenient for thermochemical studies. For typical chemical systems, the numerical difference between the quantities is small, and the distinction can often be ignored. For a hydrocarbon RH, where R is significantly larger than H, for instance, the relationship D_{0}(R−H) ≈ DH°_{298}(R−H) − 1.5 kcal/mol is a good approximation. Some textbooks ignore the temperature dependence, while others have defined the bond dissociation energy to be the reaction enthalpy of homolysis at 298 K.

The bond dissociation energy is related to but slightly different from the depth of the associated potential energy well of the bond, D_{e}, known as the electronic energy. This is due to the existence of a zero-point energy ε_{0} for the vibrational ground state, which reduces the amount of energy needed to reach the dissociation limit. Thus, D_{0} is slightly less than D_{e}, and the relationship D_{0} = D_{e} − ε_{0} holds.

The bond dissociation energy is an enthalpy change of a particular chemical process, namely homolytic bond cleavage, and "bond strength" as measured by the BDE should not be regarded as an intrinsic property of a particular bond type but rather as an energy change that depends on the chemical context. For instance, Blanksby and Ellison cites the example of ketene (H_{2}C=CO), which has a C=C bond dissociation energy of 79 kcal/mol, while ethylene (H_{2}C=CH_{2}) has a bond dissociation energy of 174 kcal/mol. This vast difference is accounted for by the thermodynamic stability of carbon monoxide (CO), formed upon the C=C bond cleavage of ketene. The difference in availability of spin states upon fragmentation further complicates the use of BDE as a measure of bond strength for head-to-head comparisons, and force constants have been suggested as an alternative.

Historically, the vast majority of tabulated bond energy values are bond enthalpies. More recently, however, the free energy analogue of bond dissociation enthalpy, known as the bond dissociation free energy (BDFE), has become more prevalent in the chemical literature. The BDFE of a bond A–B can be defined in the same way as the BDE as the standard free energy change (ΔG°) accompanying homolytic dissociation of AB into A and B. However, it is often thought of and computed stepwise as the sum of the free-energy changes of heterolytic bond dissociation (A–B → A^{+} + :B^{−}), followed by one-electron reduction of A (A^{+} + e^{−} → A•) and one-electron oxidation of B (:B^{−} → •B + e^{−}). In contrast to the BDE, which is usually defined and measured in the gas phase, the BDFE is often determined in the solution phase with respect to a solvent like DMSO, since the free-energy changes for the aforementioned thermochemical steps can be determined from parameters like acid dissociation constants (pK_{a}) and standard redox potentials (ε°) that are measured in solution.

=== Bond energy ===
Except for diatomic molecules, the bond dissociation energy differs from the bond energy. While the bond dissociation energy is the energy of a single chemical bond, the bond energy is the average of all the bond dissociation energies of the bonds of the same type for a given molecule. For a homoleptic compound EX_{n}, the E–X bond energy is (1/n) multiplied by the enthalpy change of the reaction EX_{n} → E + nX. Average bond energies given in tables are the average values of the bond energies of a collection of species containing "typical" examples of the bond in question.

For example, dissociation of HO−H bond of a water molecule (H_{2}O) requires 118.8 kcal/mol (497.1 kJ/mol). The dissociation of the remaining hydroxyl radical requires 101.8 kcal/mol (425.9 kJ/mol). The bond energy of the covalent O−H bonds in water is said to be 110.3 kcal/mol (461.5 kJ/mol), the average of these values.

In the same way, for removing successive hydrogen atoms from methane the bond dissociation energies are 105 kcal/mol (439 kJ/mol) for D(CH_{3}−H), 110 kcal/mol (460 kJ/mol) for D(CH_{2}−H), 101 kcal/mol (423 kJ/mol) for D(CH−H) and finally 81 kcal/mol (339 kJ/mol) for D(C−H). The bond energy is, thus, 99 kcal/mol, or 414 kJ/mol (the average of the bond dissociation energies). None of the individual bond dissociation energies equals the bond energy of 99 kcal/mol.

=== Strongest bonds and weakest bonds ===
According to experimental BDE data, the strongest measured single bonds are Si−F bonds. The BDE for H_{3}Si−F is 152 kcal/mol, almost 50% stronger than the H_{3}C−F bond (110 kcal/mol). The BDE for F_{3}Si−F is even larger, at 166 kcal/mol. One consequence to these data are that many reactions generate silicon fluorides, such as glass etching, deprotection in organic synthesis, and volcanic emissions. The strength of the bond is attributed to the substantial electronegativity difference between silicon and fluorine, which leads to a substantial contribution from both ionic and covalent bonding to the overall strength of the bond. For the same reason, B–F bonds are also very strong, possibly stronger than Si−F, with the BDE for F_{2}B−F computed to be 172 kcal/mol at the CCSD(T)/CBS level of theory. The C−C single bond of diacetylene (HC≡C−C≡CH) linking two sp-hybridized carbon atoms is also among the strongest, at 160 kcal/mol. The strongest bond for a neutral compound, including multiple bonds, is found in carbon monoxide at 257 kcal/mol. The protonated forms of CO, HCN and N_{2} are said to have even stronger bonds, although another study argues that the use of BDE as a measure of bond strength in these cases is misleading.

On the other end of the scale, there is no clear boundary between a very weak covalent bond and an intermolecular interaction. Lewis acid–base complexes between transition metal fragments and noble gases are among the weakest of bonds with substantial covalent character, with (CO)_{5}W:Ar having a W–Ar bond dissociation energy of less than 3.0 kcal/mol. Held together entirely by the van der Waals force, helium dimer, He_{2}, has the lowest measured bond dissociation energy of only 0.022 kcal/mol.

== Homolytic versus heterolytic dissociation ==
Bonds can be broken symmetrically or asymmetrically. The former is called homolysis and is the basis of the usual BDEs. Asymmetric scission of a bond is called heterolysis. For molecular hydrogen, the alternatives are:

Symmetric:	H_{2} → 2 H^{•}	ΔH° = 104.2 kcal/mol (see table below)
Asymmetric:	H_{2} → H^{+} + H^{−}	ΔH° = 400.4 kcal/mol (gas phase)
Asymmetric:	H_{2} → H^{+} + H^{−}	ΔG° = 34.2 kcal/mol (in water) (pK_{a}^{aq} = 25.1)

In the gas phase, the enthalpy of heterolysis is larger than that of homolysis, due to the need to separate unlike charges. However, this value is lowered substantially in the presence of a solvent.

== Representative bond enthalpies ==
The data tabulated below shows how bond strengths vary over the periodic table.

Bond	Bond	Bond-dissociation enthalpy at 298 K			Comment
Bond	Bond	(kcal/mol)	(kJ/mol)	(eV/bond)	Comment
C−C	in typical alkane	83–90	347–377	3.60–3.90	Strong, but weaker than C−H bonds
C−F	in CH_{3}F	115	481	4.99	Very strong, rationalizes inertness of Teflon
H−H	hydrogen	103	431	4.52	Strong, nonpolarizable bond
H−F	hydrogen fluoride	136	569	5.90	Very strong
O−H	in water	119	497	5.15	Very strong, hydroxyl radical reactive with almost all organics exothermically by H atom abstraction
O−H	in methanol	105	440	4.56	Slightly stronger than C−H bonds
O−H	in α-tocopherol (an antioxidant)	77	323	3.35	O−H bond strength depends strongly on substituent on O
C−O	methanol	92	385	3.99	typical alcohol
C≡O	carbon monoxide	257	1077	11.16	Strongest bond in neutral molecule
O=CO	carbon dioxide	127	532	5.51	Slightly stronger than C−H bonds, surprisingly low due to stability of C≡O
O=CH_{2}	formaldehyde	179	748	7.75	Much stronger than C−H bonds
O=O	oxygen	119	498	5.15	Stronger than single bonds, weaker than many other double bonds
N≡N	nitrogen	226	945	9.79	One of the strongest bonds, large activation energy in production of ammonia

There is great interest, especially in organic chemistry, concerning relative strengths of bonds within a given group of compounds, and representative bond dissociation energies for common organic compounds are shown below.

Bond	Bond	Bond-dissociation energy at 298 K			Comment
Bond	Bond	(kcal/mol)	(kJ/mol)	(eV/bond)	Comment
H_{3}C−H	Methyl C−H bond	105	439	4.550	One of the strongest aliphatic C−H bonds
C_{2}H_{5}−H	Ethyl C−H bond	101	423	4.384	Slightly weaker than H_{3}C−H
(CH_{3})_{2}CH−H	Isopropyl C−H bond	99	414	4.293	Secondary radicals are stabilized
(CH_{3})_{3}C−H	t-Butyl C−H bond	96.5	404	4.187	Tertiary radicals are even more stabilized
(CH_{3})_{2}NCH_{2}−H	C−H bond α to amine	91	381	3.949	Lone-pair bearing heteroatoms weaken C−H bonds
(CH_{2})_{3}OCH−H	C−H bond α to ether	92	385	3.990	Lone-pair bearing heteroatoms weaken C−H bonds. THF tends to form hydroperoxides
CH_{3}C(=O)CH_{2}−H	C−H bond α to ketone	96	402	4.163	Conjugating electron-withdrawing groups weaken C−H bonds
CH_{2}CH−H	Vinyl C−H bond	111	464	4.809	Vinyl radicals are uncommon
HCC−H	Acetylenic C−H bond	133	556	5.763	Acetylenic radicals are very rare
C_{6}H_{5}−H	Phenyl C−H bond	113	473	4.902	Comparable to vinyl radical, uncommon
CH_{2}CHCH_{2}−H	Allylic C−H bond	89	372	3.856	Such bonds show enhanced reactivity, see drying oil
C_{6}H_{5}CH_{2}−H	Benzylic C−H bond	90	377	3.907	Akin to allylic C−H bonds. Such bonds show enhanced reactivity
H_{3}C−CH_{3}	Alkane C−C bond	83–90	347–377	3.60–3.90	Much weaker than C−H bond. Homolytic cleavage occurs when H_{3}C−CH_{3} thermolysed at >500 °C
H_{2}C=CH_{2}	Alkene C=C bond	~170	~710	~7.4	About 2 times stronger than a C−C single bond; however, the π bond (~65 kcal/mol) is weaker than the σ bond
HC≡CH	Alkyne C≡C triple bond	~230	~960	~10.0	About 2.5 times stronger than a C−C single bond

== See also ==
- Bond energy
- Electronegativity
- Ionization energy
- Electron affinity
- Lattice energy
