= Bond energy =

Strength of a chemical bond

In chemistry, bond energy (BE) is one measure of the strength of a chemical bond. It is sometimes called the mean bond, bond enthalpy, average bond enthalpy, or bond strength. IUPAC defines bond energy as the average value of the gas-phase bond-dissociation energy (usually at a temperature of 298.15 K) for all bonds of the same type within the same chemical species.

The bond dissociation energy (enthalpy) is also referred to as bond disruption energy, bond energy, bond strength, or binding energy (abbreviation: BDE, BE, or D). It is defined as the standard enthalpy change of the following fission: R—X → R + X. The BDE, denoted by Dº(R—X), is usually derived by the thermochemical equation,

$$\begin{array}{lcl}
\mathrm{D^\circ(R-}X) \ = \Delta H^\circ_f\mathrm{(R)} + \Delta H^\circ_f(X) - \Delta H^\circ_f(\mathrm{R}X)
\end{array}$$

This equation tells us that the BDE for a given bond is equal to the energy of the individual components that make up the bond when they are free and unbonded minus the energy of the components when they are bonded together. These energies are given by the enthalpy of formation ΔH_{f}º of the components in each state.

The enthalpy of formation of a large number of atoms, free radicals, ions, clusters and compounds is available from the websites of NIST, NASA, CODATA, and IUPAC. Most authors use the BDE values at 298.15 K.

For example, the carbon–hydrogen bond energy in methane BE_{(C–H)} is the enthalpy change (∆H) of breaking one molecule of methane into a carbon atom and four hydrogen radicals, divided by four. The exact value for a certain pair of bonded elements varies somewhat depending on the specific molecule, so tabulated bond energies are generally averages from a number of selected typical chemical species containing that type of bond.

== Bond energy versus bond-dissociation energy ==
Bond energy (BE) is the average of all bond-dissociation energies of a single type of bond in a given molecule. The bond-dissociation energies of several different bonds of the same type can vary even within a single molecule.

For example, a water molecule is composed of two O–H bonds bonded as H–O–H. The bond energy for H_{2}O is the average energy required to break each of the two O–H bonds in sequence:

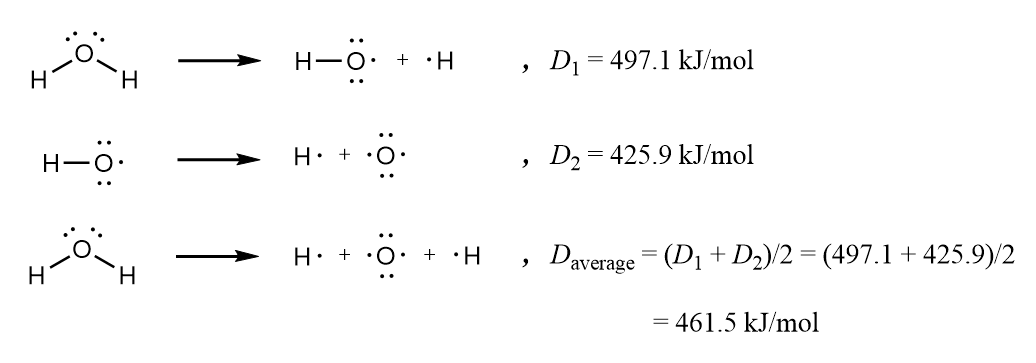

Although the two bonds are the equivalent in the original symmetric molecule, the bond-dissociation energy of an oxygen–hydrogen bond varies slightly depending on whether or not there is another hydrogen atom bonded to the oxygen atom. Thus, the bond energy of a molecule of water is 461.5 kJ/mol (110.3 kcal/mol).

When the bond is broken, the bonding electron pair will split equally to the products. This process is called homolytic bond cleavage (homolytic cleavage; homolysis) and results in the formation of radicals.

== Predicting the bond strength by radius ==
The strength of a bond can be estimated by comparing the atomic radii of the atoms that form the bond to the length of bond itself. For example, the atomic radius of boron is estimated at 85 pm, while the length of the B–B bond in diboron tetrachloride, B_{2}Cl_{4} is 175 pm. Dividing the length of this bond by the sum of each boron atom's radius gives a ratio of

$\frac{175 \ \text{pm}}{85 \ \text{pm} + 85 \ \text{pm}} = \frac{175 \ \text{pm}}{170 \ \text{pm}} \approx 1.03$ .

This ratio is slightly larger than 1, indicating that the bond itself is slightly longer than the expected minimum overlap between the two boron atoms' valence electron clouds. Thus, we can conclude that this bond is a rather weak single bond.

In another example, the atomic radius of rhenium is 135 pm, with a Re–Re bond length of 224 pm in the compound [Re_{2}Cl_{8}]^{−2}. Taking the same steps as above gives a ratio of

$\frac{224 \ \text{pm}}{135 \ \text{pm} + 135 \ \text{pm}} = \frac{224 \ \text{pm}}{270 \ \text{pm}} \approx \ 0.83$ .

This ratio is notably lower than 1, indicating that there is a large amount of overlap between the valence electron clouds of the two rhenium atoms. From this data, we can conclude that this is a very strong bond. Experimentally, the Re-Re bond in [Re_{2}Cl_{8}]^{−2} was found to be a quadruple bond. This method of determination is most useful for covalently bonded compounds.

== Factors affecting ionic bond energy ==
In ionic compounds, the electronegativity of the two atoms bonding together has a major effect on their bond energy. The extent of this effect is described by the compound's lattice energy, where a more negative lattice energy corresponds to a stronger force of attraction between the ions. Generally, greater differences in electronegativity correspond to stronger ionic bonds. For example, the compound sodium chloride (NaCl) has a lattice energy of −786 kJ/mol with an electronegativity difference of 2.23 between sodium and chlorine. Meanwhile, the compound sodium iodide (NaI) has a lower lattice energy of −704 kJ/mol with a similarly lower electronegativity difference of 1.73 between sodium and iodine.

== See also ==
- Bond-dissociation energy
- Binding energy
- Ionization energy
- Isodesmic reaction
- Lattice energy
