= Deoxyadenosyl radical =

5′-Deoxyadenosyl radical
- Structure of the deoxyadenosyl radical

Names
- IUPAC name 5′-Deoxyadenosin-5′-yl
- Systematic IUPAC name [(2R,3R,4S,5R)-5-(6-Amino-9H-purin-9-yl)-3,4-dihydroxyoxolan-2-yl]methyl

Identifiers
3D model (JSmol)	Interactive image
PubChem CID	5459908
- InChI: InChI=1S/C10H12N5O3/c1-4-6(16)7(17)10(18-4)15-3-14-5-8(11)12-2-13-9(5)15/h2-4,6-7,10,16-17H,1H2,(H2,11,12,13)/t4-,6-,7-,10-/m1/s1 Key: FMJPFPZKXLRBOJ-KQYNXXCUSA-N
- SMILES: [CH2][C@H]1O[C@@H](n2cnc3c(N)ncnc32)[C@H](O)[C@@H]1O

Properties
Chemical formula	C_{10}H_{12}N_{5}O_{3}
Molar mass	250.238 g·mol^{−1}
- Except where otherwise noted, data are given for materials in their standard state (at 25 °C [77 °F], 100 kPa). Infobox references

A deoxyadenosyl radical is a free radical that is structurally related to adenosine by removal of a 5′-hydroxy group from adenosine. This radical occurs in nature as a reactive intermediate. It is generated by radical SAM enzymes and by some varieties of vitamin B_{12}. The deoxyadenosyl radical abstracts hydrogen atoms from substrates, causing rearrangements and other post transcriptional modifications required for biosynthesis.
