= Glycine dehydrogenase (disambiguation) =

Glycine dehydrogenase is a type of enzyme.

Glycine dehydrogenase may specifically refer to:

- Glycine dehydrogenase (cyanide-forming)
- Glycine dehydrogenase (cytochrome)
- Glycine dehydrogenase (decarboxylating)
