= Coenzyme A transferases =

Transferase enzymes

CoA-transferase
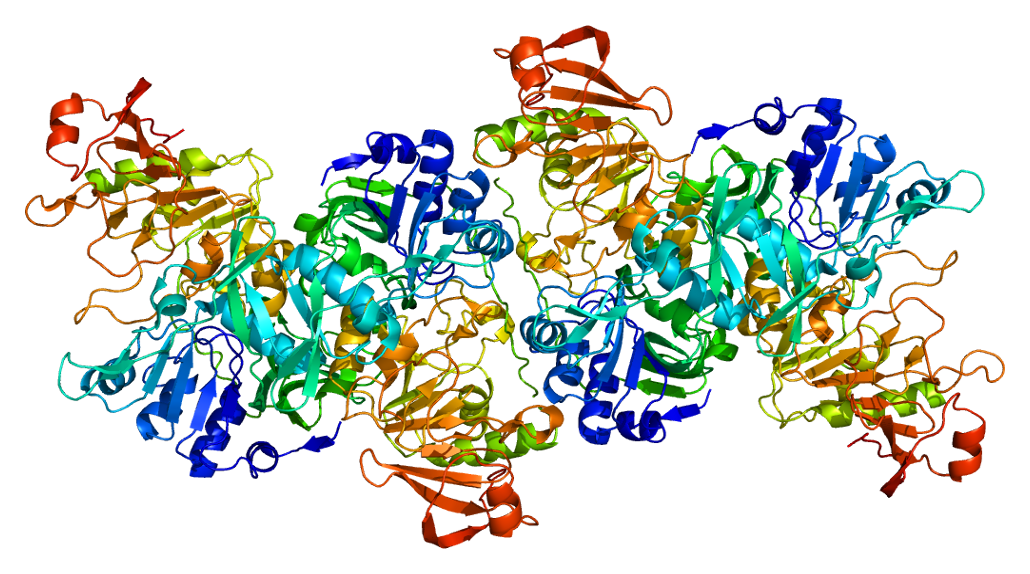
- Crystal Structure of 3-Oxoacid CoA-Transferase 1 OXCT1 from Pig Heart

Identifiers
- EC no.: 2.8.3.-

Databases
- IntEnz: IntEnz view
- BRENDA: BRENDA entry
- ExPASy: NiceZyme view
- KEGG: KEGG entry
- MetaCyc: metabolic pathway
- PRIAM: profile
- PDB structures: RCSB PDB PDBe PDBsum
Search
- PMC: articles
- PubMed: articles
- NCBI: proteins

Coenzyme A transferases (CoA-transferases) are transferase enzymes that catalyze the transfer of a coenzyme A group from an acyl-CoA donor to a carboxylic acid acceptor. Among other roles, they are responsible for transfer of CoA groups during fermentation and metabolism of ketone bodies. These enzymes are found in all three domains of life (bacteria, eukaryotes, archaea).

== Reactions ==
As a group, the CoA transferases catalyze 105 reactions at relatively fast rates. Some common reactions include

Acetyl-CoA + Butyrate $\rightleftharpoons$ Acetate + Butyryl-CoA
Acetyl-CoA + Succinate $\rightleftharpoons$ Acetate + Succinyl-CoA
Acetoacetate-CoA + Succinate $\rightleftharpoons$ Acetoacetate + Succinyl-CoA
Formate + Oxalate $\rightleftharpoons$ Formate + Oxalyl-CoA

These reactions have different functions in cells. The reaction involving acetyl-CoA and butyrate (EC 2.8.3.8), for example, forms butyrate during fermentation. The reaction involving acetyl-CoA and succinate (EC 2.8.3.18) is part of a modified TCA cycle or forms acetate during fermentation. The reaction involving acetoacetate-CoA and succinate (EC 2.8.3.5) degrades the ketone body acetoacetate formed during ketogenesis.

Many enzymes can catalyze multiple reactions, whereas some enzymes are specific and catalyze only one.

== Families ==
The CoA-transferases have been divided into six families (Cat1, OXCT1, Gct, MdcA, Frc, CitF) based on their amino acid sequences and reactions catalyzed. They also differ in the type of catalysis and their crystal structures. Despite some shared properties, these six families are not closely related (<25% amino acid similarity).

Three families catalyze CoA-transferase reactions almost exclusively. The Cat1 family catalyzes reactions involving small acyl-CoA, such as acetyl-CoA (EC 2.8.3.18)), propionyl-CoA (EC 2.8.3.1,EC 2.8.3.12), and butyryl-CoA (EC 2.8.3.8). The OXCT1 family uses oxo (EC 2.8.3.5,EC 2.8.3.6) and hydroxy acyl-CoA (EC 2.8.3.6,EC 2.8.3.1). The Frc family uses unusual acyl-CoA, including CoA thioesters of oxalate (EC 2.8.3.16,EC 2.8.3.19), bile acids (EC 2.8.3.25), and aromatic compounds (EC 2.8.3.15,(EC 2.8.3.17). Two families catalyze CoA-transferase reactions, but they also catalyze other transferase reactions. The CitF family catalyzes reactions involving acetyl-CoA and citrate EC 2.8.3.10), but its main role is as an acyl-ACP transferase (as part of citrate lyase; EC 4.1.3.6). The MdcA family catalyzes reactions involving acetyl-CoA and malonate (EC 2.8.3.3), but it too is an acyl-ACP transferase (as part of malonate decarboxylase; EC 4.1.1.9).

The Gct family has members that catalyze CoA-transferase reactions, but half of the members do not. They instead catalyze hydrolysis or other reactions involving acyl-CoA.

Historically, the CoA-transferases were divided three families (I, II, III). However, members of families I (Cat1, OXCT1, Gct) are not closely related, and the family is not monophyletic. Members of family II (CitF, MdcA) are also not closely related.

== Types of catalysis ==
Most CoA transferases rely on covalent catalysis to carry out reactions. The reaction starts when an acyl-CoA (the CoA donor) enters the active site of the enzyme. A glutamate in the active site forms an adduct with acyl-CoA. The acyl-CoA breaks at the thioester bond, forming a CoA and carboxylic acid. The carboxylic acid remains bound to the enzyme, but it is soon displaced by CoA and leaves. A new carboxylic acid (the CoA acceptor) enters and forms a new acyl-CoA. The new acyl-CoA is released, completing the transfer of CoA from one molecule to another.

The type of catalysis differs by family. In Cat1, OXCT1, and Gct families, the catalytic residue in the active site is a glutamate. However, the glutamate in the Cat1 family is in a different position than in the OXCT1 and Gct families. In the Frc family, the catalytic residue is an aspartate, not a glutamate. In MdcA and CitF families, covalent catalysis is not thought to occur.

== Crystal structures ==
Crystal structures have been determined for 21 different enzymes. More structures have been determined, but they belong to putative enzymes (proteins with no direct evidence of catalytic activity).

All CoA-transferases have alternating layers of α helices and β sheets, and thus they belong to the α/β class of proteins. The number and arrangement of these layers differs by family. The Gct family, for example, has extra layers of α helices and β sheets compared to Cat1 and OXCT1 families.

Further, all enzymes have two different domains. These domains can either occur on the same polypeptide or can be separated between two different polypeptides. In some cases, the genes for the domains are duplicated in the genome.

== Occurrence in organisms ==
CoA transferases have been found in all three domains of life. The majority have been found in bacteria, with fewer in eukaryotes. One CoA transferase has been found in archaea.

Two CoA-transferases been found in humans. They include 3-oxoacid CoA-transferase (EC 2.8.3.5) and succinate—hydroxymethylglutarate CoA-transferase (EC 2.8.3.13).

== Role in disease ==
Mutations in two different CoA-transferases have been described and lead to disease in humans. 3-oxoacid CoA-transferase(EC 2.8.3.5) uses the ketone body acetoacetate. Mutations in the enzyme cause accumulation of acetoacetate and ketoacidosis. The severity of ketoacidosis depends on the mutation.

The enzyme succinate—hydroxymethylglutarate CoA-transferase (EC 2.8.3.13) uses glutarate, a product of tryptophan and lysine metabolism. Mutations in this enzyme cause accumulation of glutarate (glutaric aciduria).

== See also ==
- List of EC numbers (EC 2)#EC 2.8.3: CoA-transferases 2
- succinyl-CoA:3-oxoacid CoA transferase deficiency
