= Acetate CoA-transferase =

Class of enzymes

acetate CoA-transferase

Identifiers
- EC no.: 2.8.3.8
- CAS no.: 37278-35-6

Databases
- IntEnz: IntEnz view
- BRENDA: BRENDA entry
- ExPASy: NiceZyme view
- KEGG: KEGG entry
- MetaCyc: metabolic pathway
- PRIAM: profile
- PDB structures: RCSB PDB PDBe PDBsum
- Gene Ontology: AmiGO / QuickGO
Search
- PMC: articles
- PubMed: articles
- NCBI: proteins

In enzymology, an acetate CoA-transferase (EC 2.8.3.8) is an enzyme that catalyzes the chemical reaction

acyl-CoA + acetate $\rightleftharpoons$ a fatty acid anion + acetyl-CoA

Thus, the two substrates of this enzyme are acyl-CoA and acetate, whereas its two products are long-chain carboxylate anion and acetyl-CoA.

This enzyme belongs to the family of transferases, specifically the CoA-transferases. The systematic name of this enzyme class is acyl-CoA:acetate CoA-transferase. Other names in common use include acetate coenzyme A-transferase, butyryl CoA:acetate CoA transferase, butyryl coenzyme A transferase, and succinyl-CoA:acetate CoA transferase.

This enzyme participates in 4 metabolic pathways:

- benzoate metabolism via ligation of CoA
- propanoate metabolism
- butanoate metabolism
- two-component system.

== Structural studies ==
As of late 2007, only one structure has been solved for this class of enzymes, with the PDB accession code 1K6D.
