= C2orf81 =

Human gene

Identifiers
- Aliases: C2orf81, hCG40743, chromosome 2 open reading frame 81
- External IDs: MGI: 1919087; HomoloGene: 52846; GeneCards: C2orf81; OMA:C2orf81 - orthologs

Gene location (Human)
Chr.	Chromosome 2 (human)
Band	2p13.1	Start	74,414,176 bp
Band	2p13.1	End	74,421,619 bp

Gene location (Mouse)
Chr.	Chromosome 6 (mouse)
Band	6|6 C3	Start	83,133,386 bp
Band	6|6 C3	End	83,139,927 bp
RNA expression pattern
Bgee	Human / Mouse (ortholog); Top expressed in: right uterine tube; olfactory zone of nasal mucosa; right testis; left testis; pituitary gland; anterior pituitary; ventricular zone; canal of the cervix; stromal cell of endometrium; granulocyte / Top expressed in: spermatid; spermatocyte; seminiferous tubule; superior frontal gyrus; visual cortex; primary visual cortex; dentate gyrus of hippocampal formation granule cell; choroid plexus; layer of retina; right kidney; More reference expression data
BioGPS	n/a
Orthologs
Species	Human	Mouse
Entrez	388963	71837
Ensembl	ENSG00000284308	ENSMUSG00000030030
UniProt	A6NN90	Q9DAQ4
RefSeq (mRNA)	NM_001145054; NM_001316764; NM_001316765; NM_001316766	NM_027948
RefSeq (protein)	NP_001138526; NP_001303693; NP_001303694; NP_001303695	NP_082224
Location (UCSC)	Chr 2: 74.41 – 74.42 Mb	Chr 6: 83.13 – 83.14 Mb
PubMed search
- Wikidata
View/Edit Human	View/Edit Mouse

C2orf81 is a human gene encoding protein c2orf81, which is predicted to have nuclear localization.

== Gene ==
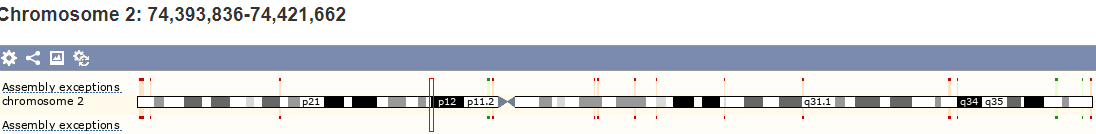
Location of C2orf81 on chromosome 2 via Ensembl

C2orf81's aliases are LOC388963 and hCG40743. The gene spans from bases 74,414,176 to 74,421,591 on the minus (-) strand of chromosome 2, and contains 4 exons. The coding region is 2086 base pairs, and the protein sequence contains 615 amino acids.

=== Expression ===
The protein encoded by c2orf81 is expressed highly in testis, kidneys, and about 18 other tissues in humans. Disease states in which it is expressed include in gliomas, neoplasm, and lymphoma.

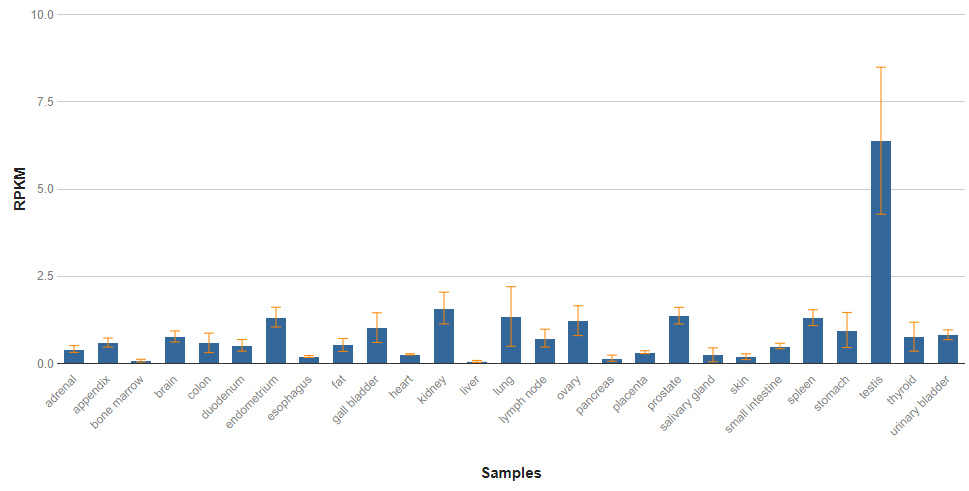
Tissues in which c2orf81 is expressed

=== Transcription Variants ===
Only a few mutations have been documented to occur in c2orf81. Three common missense mutations occur in the 3’ UTR and in the coding sequence which change serine to leucine in the protein. Nonsense mutations have been documented as well, occurring exclusively in the codon for proline.

=== mRNA ===
The mRNA sequence contains and 2086 base pairs and 4 isoforms.

== Protein ==
=== Properties and Composition ===
C2orf81 has a molecular weight of 66.6 kDa and its isoelectric point is 5.32. It contains a high amount of prolines in the human protein and most mammalian homologs, but a higher amount of glutamic acid residues in non-mammalian vertebrate homologs. C2orf81 has 4 isoforms and its most common isoform contains 615 amino acids. Isoforms 2 through 4 have 566, 520 and 588 amino acids respectively. C2orf81 is the only member of superfamily cl25621.

=== Domains ===
Domain of unknown function (DUF) 4639 is unique to the c2orf81 protein and is conserved in eukaryotes. DUF 4639 spans from amino acid 17 to the end of the protein in human c2orf81.

=== Subcellular Localization ===
C2orf81 is primarily predicted to be nuclear, but potentially also cytoplasmic and mitochondrial.

=== Interacting proteins ===
C2orf81 protein is predicted to interact highly with enoyl-CoA hydratase and hydroxyacyl-CoA dehydrogenase, based on textmining and database searches. Other predicted interacting proteins are acetyl-CoA carboxylases A and B, glycine dehydrogenase, 3-oxoacid CoA transferase 2.

=== Structure ===
The c2orf81 is composed mainly of alpha helices. It contains fewer beta pleated sheets, turns, and coils.

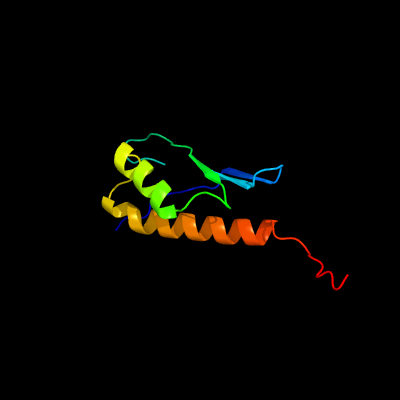
A prediction of secondary structure of a portion of c2orf81 generated by Phyre2.

=== Function ===
Despite consisting almost entirely of domain of unknown function, the c2orf81 gene has been analyzed in a study of sites prone to DNA methylation. Another study found the gene c2orf81 to overlap with other genes. Genes from its loci have been related to Alstrom syndrome, cleft palate, neurodevelopmental delays, macrocephaly, and Perry syndrome.

=== Post-translational modifications ===
In human c2orf81, phosphorylation is expected to be undergone only in serines, but not in any threonines or tyrosines. O-linked glycosylation is predicted to occur at 3 sites toward the C-terminus. These sites are well-conserved in all homologs. C2orf81 contains one potential SUMOylation site towards the end of the protein with the sequence GKAE.

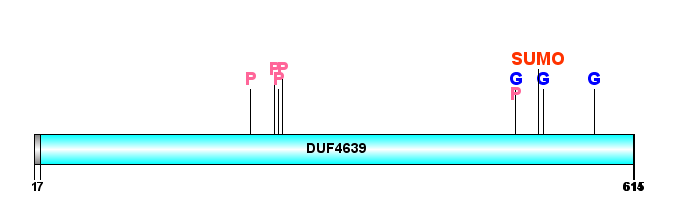
A diagram depicting predicted post-translational modifications of c2orf81.

== Homology ==
=== Paralogs ===
C2orf81 was found to have one paralog, Homo sapiens BAC clone RP11-523H20.

=== Homologs ===
The c2orf81 protein is conserved highly in primates and other mammals, but less so in non-mammalian vertebrates. Its most distant homolog is in the Asian swamp eel. Below is a table showing homologs of c2orf81 and their date of divergence and percent identity to the c2orf81 protein sequence.

Species	Date of divergence (mya)	Protein identity
Bonobo	6.4	99%
Gorilla	8.61	94%
Orangutan	15.2	95%
Macaque	28.1	92%
Lemur	82	72%
Mouse	88	52%
Minke whale	94	69%
Cow	94	66%
Pig	94	64%
Chinese softshell turtle	320	69%
Ostrich	320	62%
American golden eagle	320	42%
Asian swamp eel	432	35%

=== Evolution ===
C2orf81 has evolved quickly over time. The N-terminus of the protein has evolved less quickly than the rest of the protein.
