= Theanine hydrolase =

Class of enzymes

Identifiers
- EC no.: 3.5.1.65
- CAS no.: 99533-51-4

Databases
- BRENDA: enzyme data
- ExPASy: NiceZyme view
- KEGG: enzyme entry
- MetaCyc: metabolic pathway
- Rhea: reactions
- PDB structures: RCSB PDB PDBe PDBsum
- Gene Ontology: AmiGO / QuickGO
Search
- PMC: articles
- PubMed: articles
- NCBI: proteins

Theanine hydrolase (EC 3.5.1.65) is an enzyme characterised from tea that catalyzes the hydrolysis of theanine to L-glutamic acid and ethylamine:

theanine
H_{2}O
L-glutamic acid
+ CH_{3}CH_{2}NH_{2}

Theamine is the non-proteinogenic amino acid which gives tea its umami taste. Hence it is used as a food additive and metabolic engineering has been used to produce it.

This enzyme is a hydrolase, one acting on carbon-nitrogen bonds other than peptide bonds, specifically in linear amides. The systematic name of this enzyme class is N5-ethyl-L-glutamine amidohydrolase. Other names in use include L-theanine amidohydrolase, and 5-N-ethyl-L-glutamine amidohydrolase.
