= Relaxation drink =

Type of functional drink

A relaxation drink is a non-alcoholic beverage containing calming ingredients normally found in nature. It is a functional beverage that serves to calm a person but unlike other calming beverages such as tea, relaxation drinks almost universally contain more than one active ingredient. Relaxation drinks may be served chilled and carbonated. Others have now been introduced in shot-form.

== Ingredients ==
Kava roots are well known in the Pacific Islands and are mostly grown in Tonga and Fiji. Kava is known to be used for social rituals and celebrations. Melatonin is another major ingredient found in relaxation drinks which also carry some controversy due to the negative effects of long-term use. Relaxation drinks have been known to contain other natural ingredients. Common ingredients in relaxation drinks may contain kava root, melatonin, valerian root, gamma-aminobutyric acid (GABA), Chamomile, Melissa officinalis, L-glycine, L-taurine, L-Theanine, L-Threonine, 5-Hydroxytryptophan, or Passiflora. Relaxation drinks are usually free of caffeine and alcohol but some contain marijuana.

== Function ==
Relaxation drinks are formulated to help reduce stress and anxiety, improve focus, and promote better sleep. Relaxation drinks can be considered the anti-energy drink and have found a niche alongside energy drinks. Some relaxation shots, particularly those with L-theanine, have been known to be used alongside coffee as a way to counter some of the jittery-feeling caffeine can produce.

== Uses ==
In many scenarios, people use relaxation drinks for dealing with stressful situations, after a work day, after strenuous exercise, or before bedtime. Further uses have also included aiding anxiety relief. Studies have found that ingredients found in relaxation drinks can help promote alpha wave brain wave patterns to improve focus. Depending on the formulation, relaxation drinks may promote Rapid eye movement sleep (REM) sleep.

Relaxation drinks have been known to reduce stress, anxiety, and calm nervousness due to their calming effects on the nervous system.

People who are allergic to alcohol, recovering from alcohol abuse, or have liver problems have resorted to drinking relaxation drinks because of their ability to calm nerves and provide what people call a "buzz" however it is alcohol-free which does not bring about the well-known hangover. This is all dependent on the nutritional content which varies from one relaxation drink to another. There are reports of melatonin causing this next-day grogginess feeling.

People with Attention deficit hyperactivity disorder (ADHD) have been known to use relaxation drinks to substitute for Dexedrine because of the properties to help focus thoughts.

Some relaxation drinks can cause drowsiness and should not be taken while driving or operating heavy machinery.

== See also ==
- gamma-Glutamylmethylamide
- Blue lotus (Nypmhaea caerulea)
- California poppy (Eschscholzia californica)
- Common blue violet (Viola sororia)
- Catnip (Nepeta cataria)
- Valerian (Valeriana officinalis)
- Drinking chocolate
- Rose hip
