= Drink =

Liquid intended for human consumption

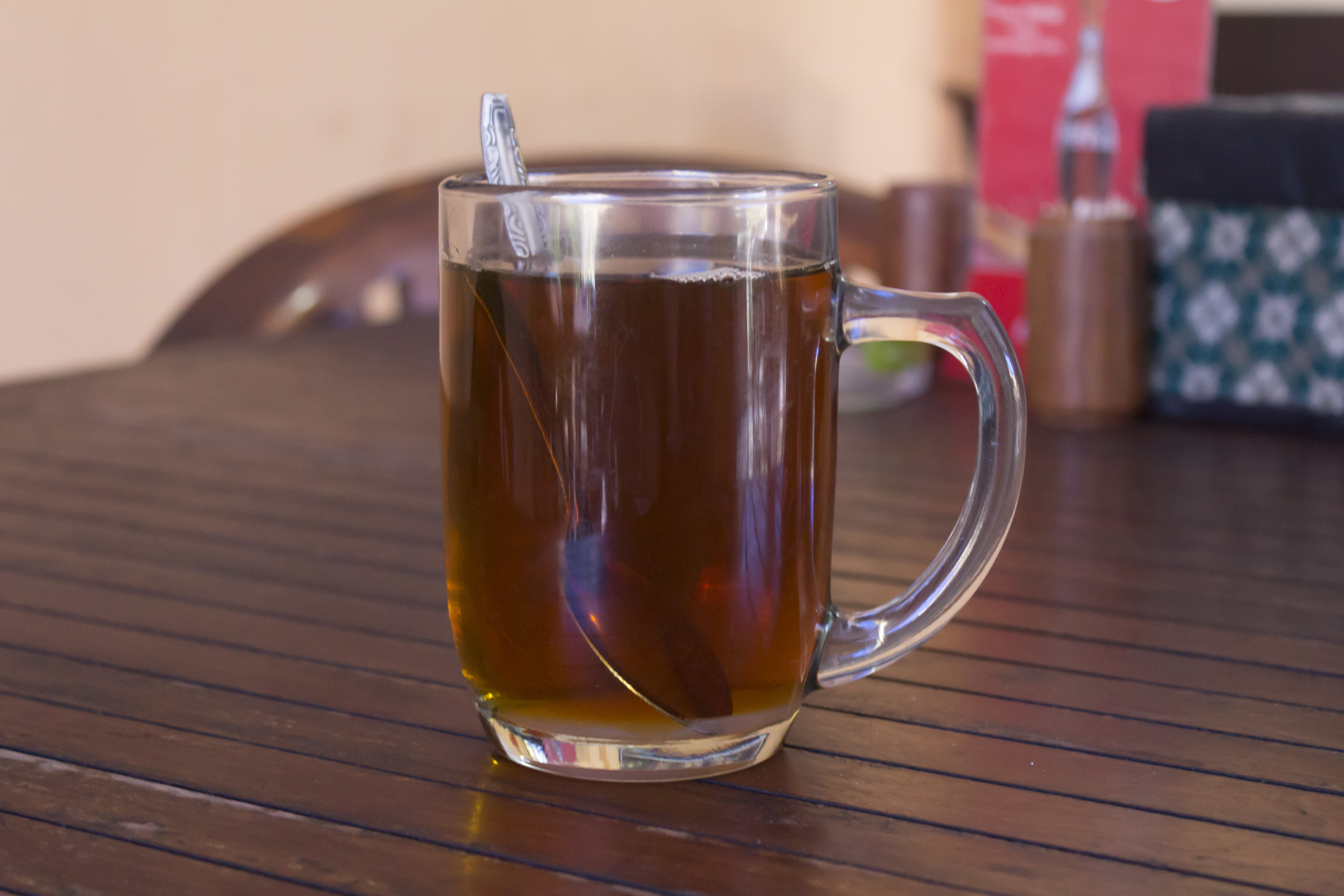
Tea is the second‑most‑consumed drink in the world, after plain drinking water.

A drink or beverage is a liquid intended for human consumption. Water is the common basis for drinks. In addition to their vital function of satisfying thirst, drinks play important roles in human culture. Common types of drinks include plain drinking water, milk, juice, smoothies and soft drinks. Traditionally warm beverages encompass coffee, tea, and hot chocolate. Caffeinated drinks that contain the stimulant caffeine have been consumed for centuries.

In addition, alcoholic drinks such as wine, beer, and liquor, which contain the psychoactive substance ethanol, have been part of human culture for more than 8,000 years. Non-alcoholic drinks typically refer to beverages that are traditionally alcoholic but are produced with a very low alcohol by volume content or the alcohol is removed.

== Biology ==
When the human body becomes dehydrated, a person experiences thirst. This craving for fluids results in an instinctive need to drink. Thirst is regulated by the hypothalamus in response to subtle changes in the body's electrolyte levels, and also as a result of changes in the volume of blood circulating. The complete deprivation of drinks (that is, water) will result in death faster than the removal of any other substance besides oxygen. Water and milk (a water-based fluid) have been basic drinks throughout history. As water is essential for life, it has also been the carrier of many diseases.

As society developed, techniques were discovered to create alcoholic drinks from plants available in different areas. The earliest archaeological evidence of wine production yet found has been at sites in Georgia (c. 6000 BCE) and Iran (c. 5000 BCE). Beer may have been known in Neolithic Europe as far back as 3000 BCE, and was mainly brewed on a domestic scale. The invention of beer (and bread) has been argued to be responsible for humanity's ability to develop technology and build civilization. Tea likely originated in Yunnan, China, during the Shang dynasty (1500 BCE–1046 BCE) as a medicinal drink.

== History ==
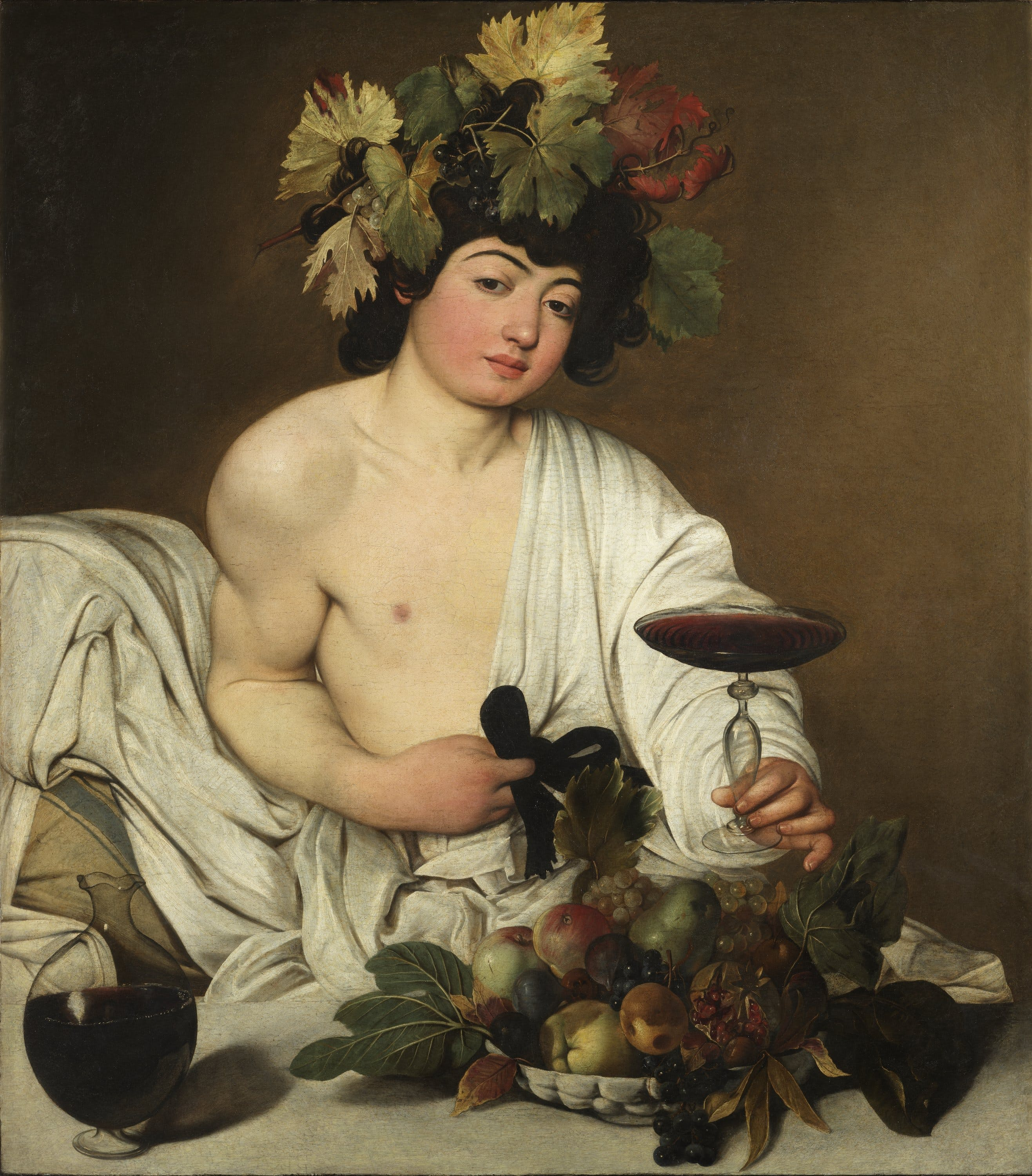
Caravaggio's interpretation of Bacchus

Drinking has been a large part of socialising throughout the centuries. In ancient Greece, a social gathering for the purpose of drinking was known as a symposium, where watered-down wine would be drunk. The purpose of these gatherings could be anything from serious discussions to direct indulgence. In ancient Rome, a similar concept of a convivium took place regularly.

Many early societies considered alcohol a gift from the gods, leading to the creation of gods such as Dionysus. Other religions forbid, discourage, or restrict the drinking of alcoholic drinks for various reasons. In some regions with a dominant religion the production, sale, and consumption of alcoholic drinks is forbidden to everybody, regardless of religion.

Toasting is a method of honoring a person or wishing goodwill by taking a drink. Another tradition is that of the loving cup; at weddings or other celebrations such as sports victories a group will share a drink in a large receptacle, shared by everyone until empty.

In East Africa and Yemen, coffee was used in native religious ceremonies. As these ceremonies conflicted with the beliefs of the Christian church, the Ethiopian Church banned the secular consumption of coffee until the reign of Emperor Menelik II. The drink was also banned in Ottoman Turkey during the 17th century for political reasons and was associated with rebellious political activities in Europe.

== Production ==
A drink is a form of liquid which has been prepared for human consumption. The preparation can include a number of different steps, some before transport, others immediately before consumption.

=== Purification of water ===
Water is the chief constituent in all drinks, and the primary ingredient in most. Water is purified before drinking. Methods for purification include filtration and the addition of chemicals, such as chlorination. The importance of purified water is highlighted by the World Health Organization, who point out 94% of deaths from diarrhea – the third biggest cause of infectious death worldwide at 1.8 million annually – could be prevented by improving the quality of the victim's environment, particularly safe water.

=== Pasteurization ===
Pasteurization is the process of heating a liquid for a period of time at a specified temperature, then immediately cooling. The process reduces the growth of microorganisms within the liquid, thereby increasing the time before spoilage. It is primarily used on milk, which before pasteurization is commonly infected with pathogenic bacteria and therefore is more likely than any other part of the common diet in the developed world to cause illness.

=== Juicing ===
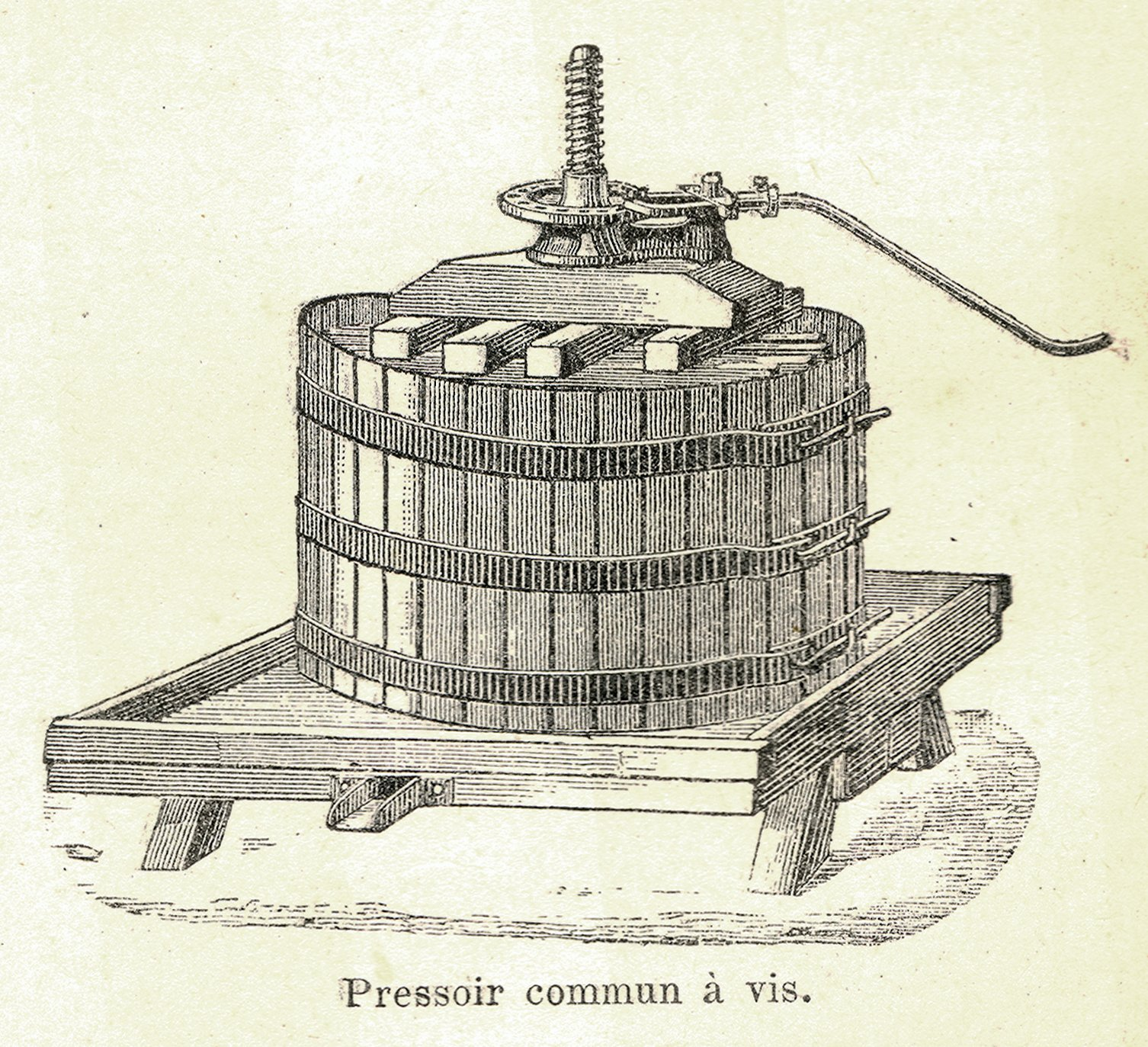
First developed in the Middle Ages, basket presses have a long history of use in winemaking.

The process of extracting juice from fruits and vegetables can take a number of forms. Simple crushing of most fruits will provide a significant amount of liquid, though a more intense pressure can be applied to get the maximum amount of juice from the fruit. Both crushing and pressing are processes used in the production of wine.

=== Infusion ===
Infusion is the process of extracting flavors from plant material by allowing the material to remain suspended within water. This process is used in the production of teas, herbal teas and can be used to prepare coffee (when using a coffee press).

=== Percolation ===
The name is derived from the word "percolate" which means to cause (a solvent) to pass through a permeable substance especially for extracting a soluble constituent. In the case of coffee-brewing the solvent is water, the permeable substance is the coffee grounds, and the soluble constituents are the chemical compounds that give coffee its color, taste, aroma, and stimulating properties.

=== Carbonation ===
Carbonation is the process of dissolving carbon dioxide into a liquid, such as water.

=== Fermentation ===
Fermentation is a metabolic process that converts sugar to ethanol. Fermentation has been used by humans for the production of drinks since the Neolithic age. In winemaking, grape juice is combined with yeast in an anaerobic environment to allow the fermentation. The amount of sugar in the wine and the length of time given for fermentation determine the alcohol level and the sweetness of the wine.

When brewing beer, there are four primary ingredients – water, grain, yeast and hops. The grain is encouraged to germinate by soaking and drying in heat, a process known as malting. It is then milled before soaking again to create the sugars needed for fermentation. This process is known as mashing. Hops are added for flavouring, then the yeast is added to the mixture (now called wort) to start the fermentation process.

=== Distillation ===
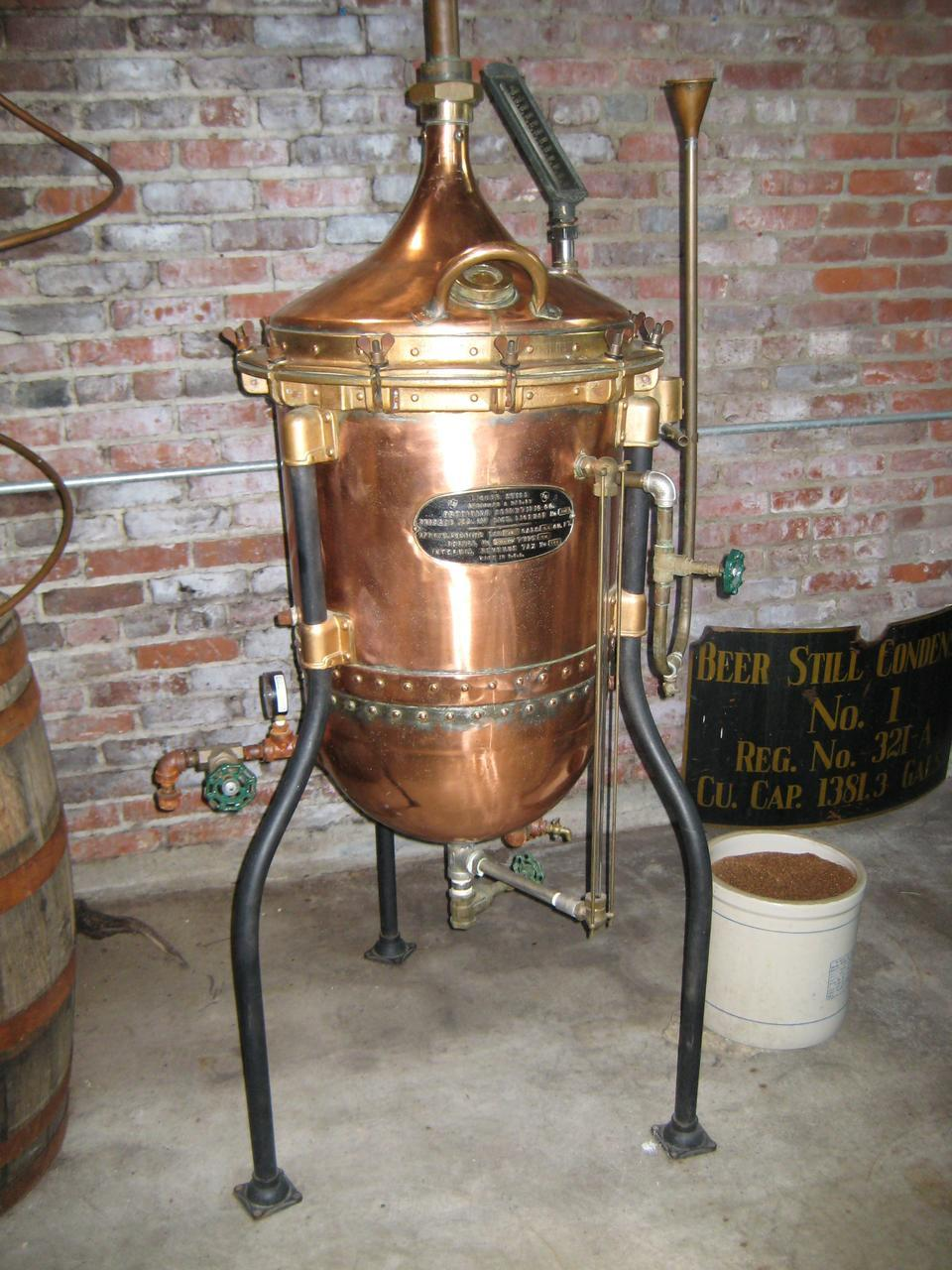
An old whiskey still

Distillation is a method of separating mixtures based on differences in volatility of components in a boiling liquid mixture. It is one of the methods used in the purification of water. It is also a method of producing spirits from milder alcoholic drinks.

=== Mixing ===
An alcoholic mixed drink that contains two or more ingredients is referred to as a cocktail. Cocktails were originally a mixture of spirits, sugar, water, and bitters. The term is now often used for almost any mixed drink that contains alcohol, including mixers, mixed shots, etc. A cocktail today usually contains one or more kinds of spirit and one or more mixers, such as soda or fruit juice. Additional ingredients may be sugar, honey, milk, cream, and various herbs.

== Type ==
=== Non-alcoholic drinks ===
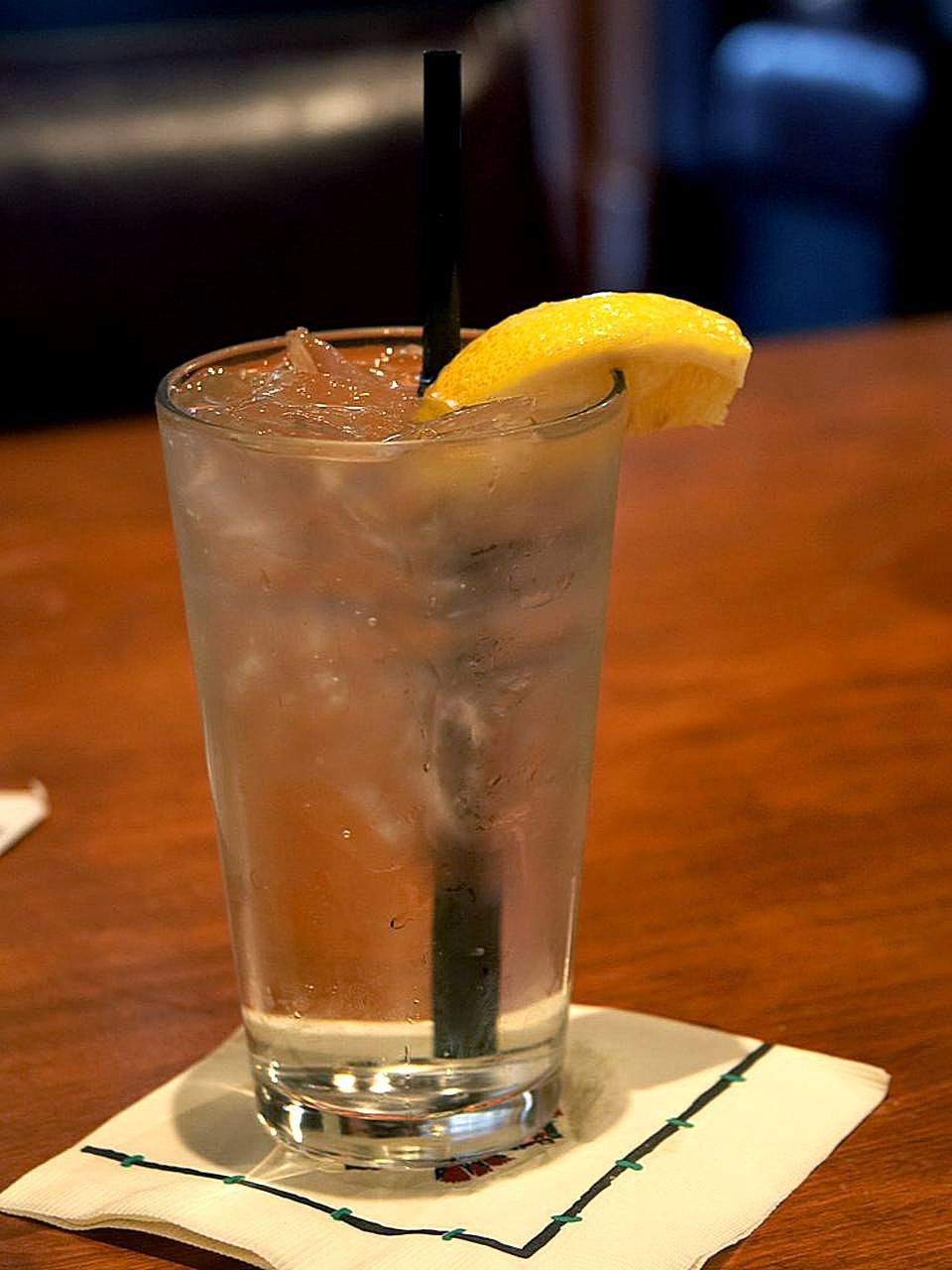
Ice water with a slice of lemon

A non-alcoholic drink contains little or no alcohol. This category includes low-alcohol beer, non-alcoholic wine, and apple cider if they contain a sufficiently low concentration of alcohol by volume (ABV). The exact definition of what is "non-alcoholic" and what is not depends on local laws: in the United Kingdom, "alcohol-free beer" is under 0.05% ABV, "de-alcoholised beer" is under 0.5%, while "low-alcohol beer" can contain no more than 1.2% ABV. The term "soft drink" specifies the absence of alcohol in contrast to "hard drink" and "drink". The term "drink" is theoretically neutral, but often is used in a way that suggests alcoholic content. Drinks such as soda pop, sparkling water, iced tea, lemonade, root beer, fruit punch, milk, hot chocolate, tea, coffee, milkshakes, tap water, bottled water, juice, and energy drinks are all soft drinks.

==== Water ====
Water is the world's most consumed drink, however, 97% of water on Earth is non-drinkable salt water. Fresh water is found in rivers, lakes, wetlands, groundwater, and frozen glaciers. Less than 1% of the Earth's fresh water supplies are accessible through surface water and underground sources which are cost-effective to retrieve.

In Western cultures, water is often drunk cold. In Chinese culture, it is typically drunk hot.

==== Milk ====
Milk is regarded as one of the "original" drinks; milk is the primary source of nutrition for babies. In many cultures of the world, especially the Western world, humans continue to consume dairy milk beyond infancy, using the milk of other animals (especially cattle, goats and sheep) as a drink.

==== Carbonated drinks ====
Carbonated drinks refer to drinks which have carbon dioxide dissolved into them. This can happen naturally through fermenting and in natural water spas or artificially by the dissolution of carbon dioxide under pressure. The first commercially available artificially carbonated drink is believed to have been produced by Thomas Henry in the late 1770s. Cola, orange, various roots, ginger, and lemon/lime are commonly used to create non-alcoholic carbonated drinks; sugars and preservatives may be added later.

The most consumed carbonated soft drinks are produced by three major global brands: Coca-Cola, PepsiCo and the Dr Pepper Snapple Group.

==== Hot drinks ====
These drinks are often served warm or hot.

===== Coffee =====
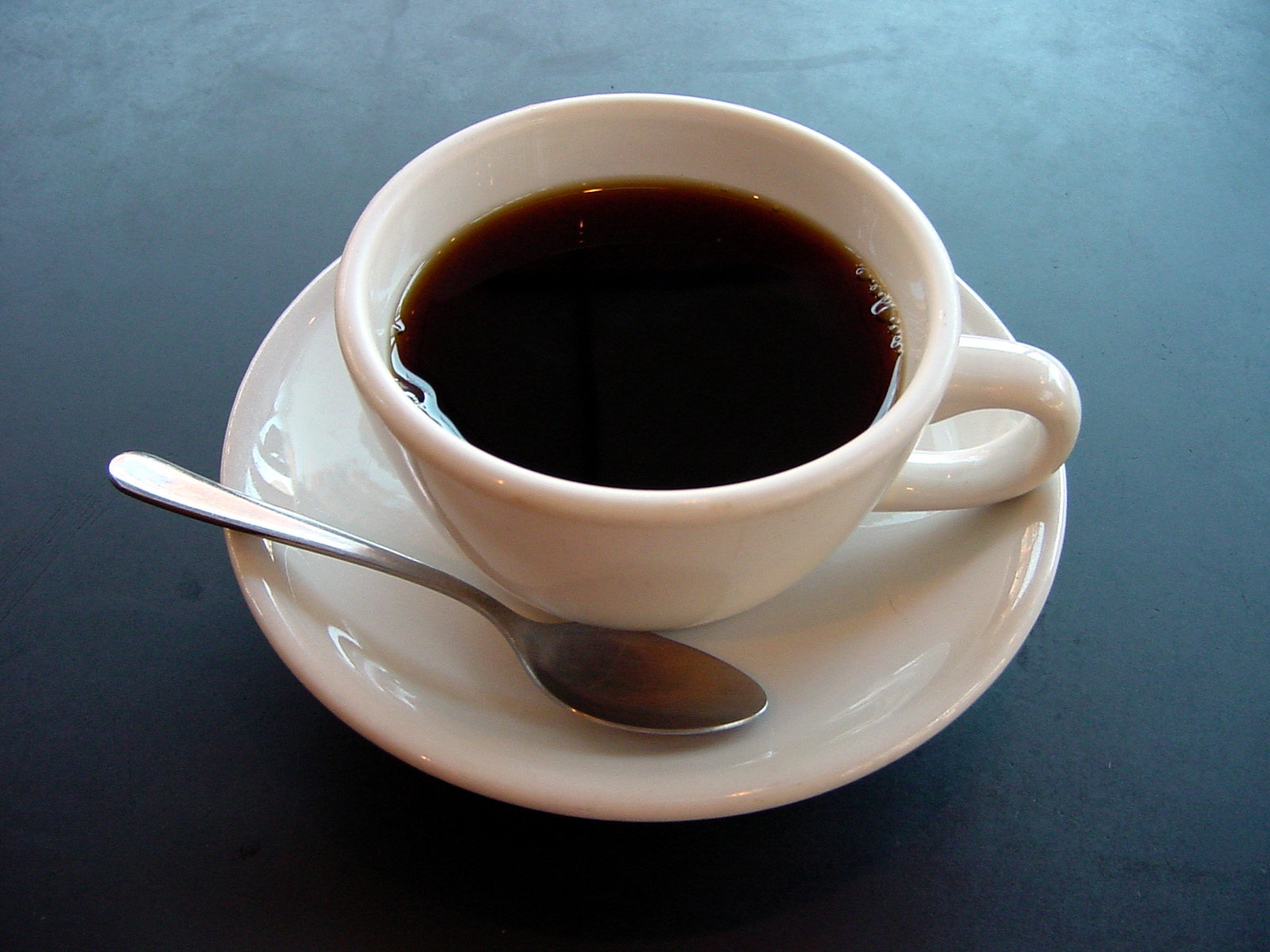
A cup of black coffee

Coffee is a brewed drink prepared from the roasted seeds of several species of an evergreen shrub of the genus Coffea. The two most common sources of coffee beans are the highly regarded Coffea arabica and the "robusta" form of the hardier Coffea canephora. Coffee plants are cultivated in more than 70 countries. Once ripe, coffee "berries" are picked, processed, and dried to yield the seeds inside. The seeds are then roasted to varying degrees, depending on the desired flavor, before being ground and brewed to create coffee.

Coffee is slightly acidic (pH 5.0–5.1) and can have a stimulating effect on humans because of its caffeine content. It is one of the most popular drinks in the world. It can be prepared and presented in a variety of ways. The effect of coffee on human health has been a subject of many studies; however, results have varied in terms of coffee's relative benefit.

Coffee cultivation first took place in southern Arabia; the earliest credible evidence of coffee-drinking appears in the middle of the 15th century in the Sufi shrines of Yemen.

Coffee may have been used socially in the renaissance period of the 17th century. The increasing trades between Europe and North Africa regions made coffee more widely available to Europeans gathering at social locations that served coffee, possibly contributing to the growth of coffeehouses.

===== Hot chocolate =====
Hot chocolate, also known as drinking chocolate or cocoa, is a heated drink consisting of shaved chocolate, melted chocolate or cocoa powder, heated milk or water, and usually a sweetener. Hot chocolate may be topped with whipped cream. Hot chocolate made with melted chocolate is sometimes called drinking chocolate, characterized by less sweetness and a thicker consistency.

The first chocolate drink is believed to have been created by the Mayans around 2,500-3,000 years ago, and a cocoa drink was an essential part of Aztec culture by 1400 AD, by which they referred to as xocōlātl. The drink became popular in Europe after being introduced from Mexico in the New World and has undergone multiple changes since then. Until the 19th century, hot chocolate was even used medicinally to treat ailments such as liver and stomach diseases.

Hot chocolate is consumed throughout the world and comes in multiple variations, including the spiced chocolate para mesa of Latin America, the very thick cioccolata calda served in Italy, chocolate a la taza served in Spain, and the thinner hot cocoa consumed in the United States. Prepared hot chocolate can be purchased from a range of establishments, including cafeterias, fast food restaurants, coffeehouses and teahouses. Powdered hot chocolate mixes, which can be added to boiling water or hot milk to make the drink at home, are sold at grocery stores and online.

===== Tea =====
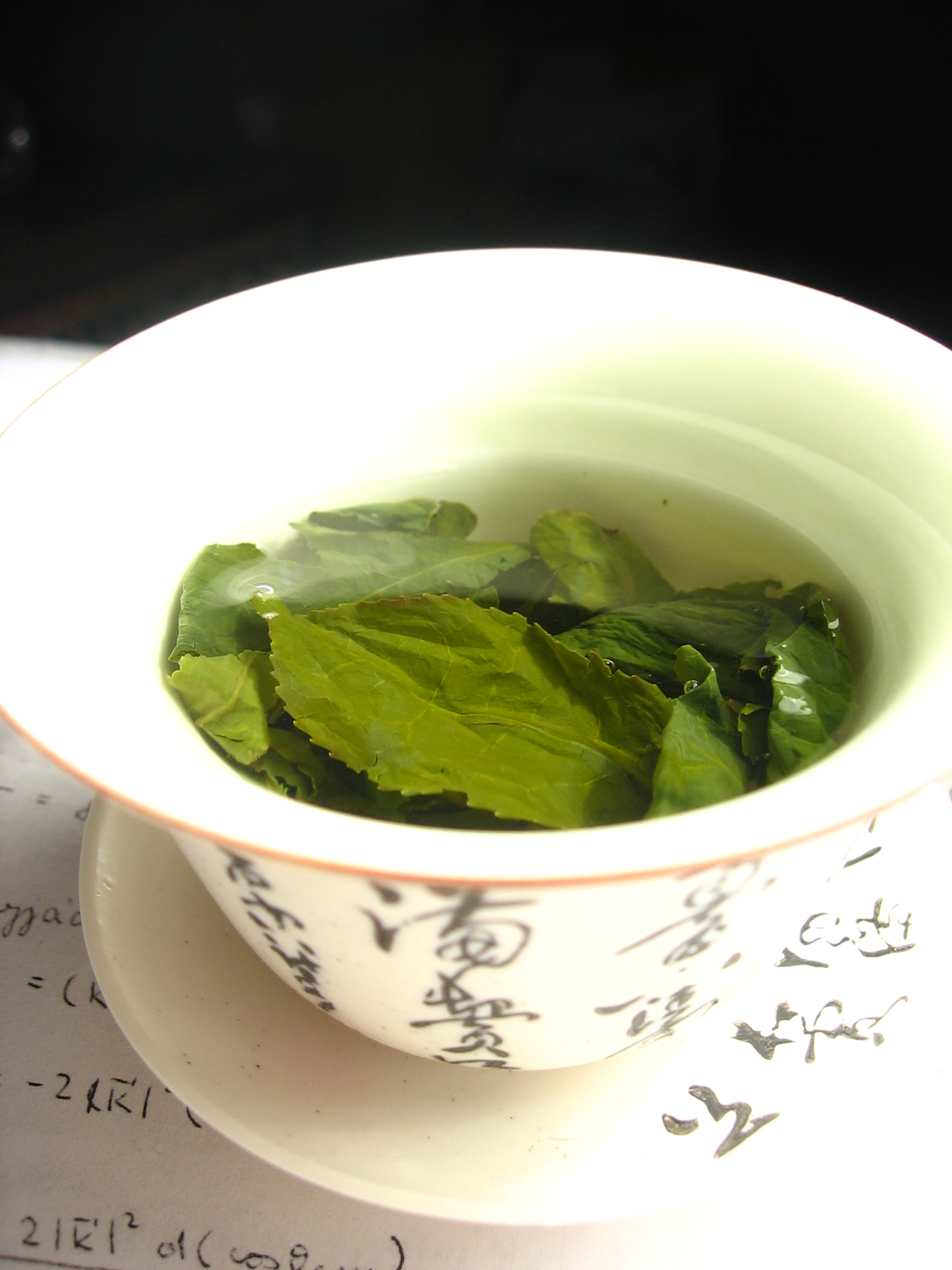
Oolong tea

Tea, the second most consumed drink in the world, is produced from infusing dried leaves of the Camellia sinensis shrub in boiling water. There are many ways in which tea is prepared for consumption: lemon or milk and sugar are among the most common additives worldwide. Other additions include butter and salt in Bhutan, Nepal, and Tibet; bubble tea in Taiwan; fresh ginger in Indonesia, Malaysia and Singapore; mint in North Africa and Senegal; cardamom in Central Asia; rum to make Jagertee in Central Europe; and coffee to make yuanyang in Hong Kong. Tea is also served differently from country to country: in China, Japan and South Korea tiny cups are used to serve tea; in Thailand and the United States tea is often served cold (as "iced tea") or with a lot of sweetener; Indians boil tea with milk and a blend of spices as masala chai; tea is brewed with a samovar in Iran, Kashmir, Russia and Turkey; and in the Australian Outback it is traditionally brewed in a billycan. Tea leaves can be processed in different ways resulting in a drink which appears and tastes different. Chinese yellow and green tea are steamed, roasted and dried; Oolong tea is semi-oxidised and appears green-black and black teas are fully oxidised.

===== Herbal tea =====
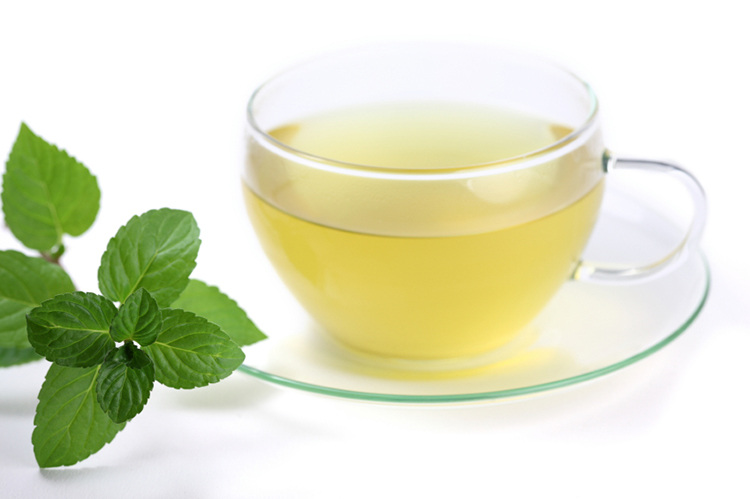
Mint tea is a popular tisane.

Around the world, people refer to other herbal infusions as "teas"; it is also argued that these were popular long before the Camellia sinensis shrub was used for tea making. Leaves, flowers, roots or bark can be used to make a herbal infusion and can be bought fresh, dried or powdered.

==== Juice and plant drinks ====
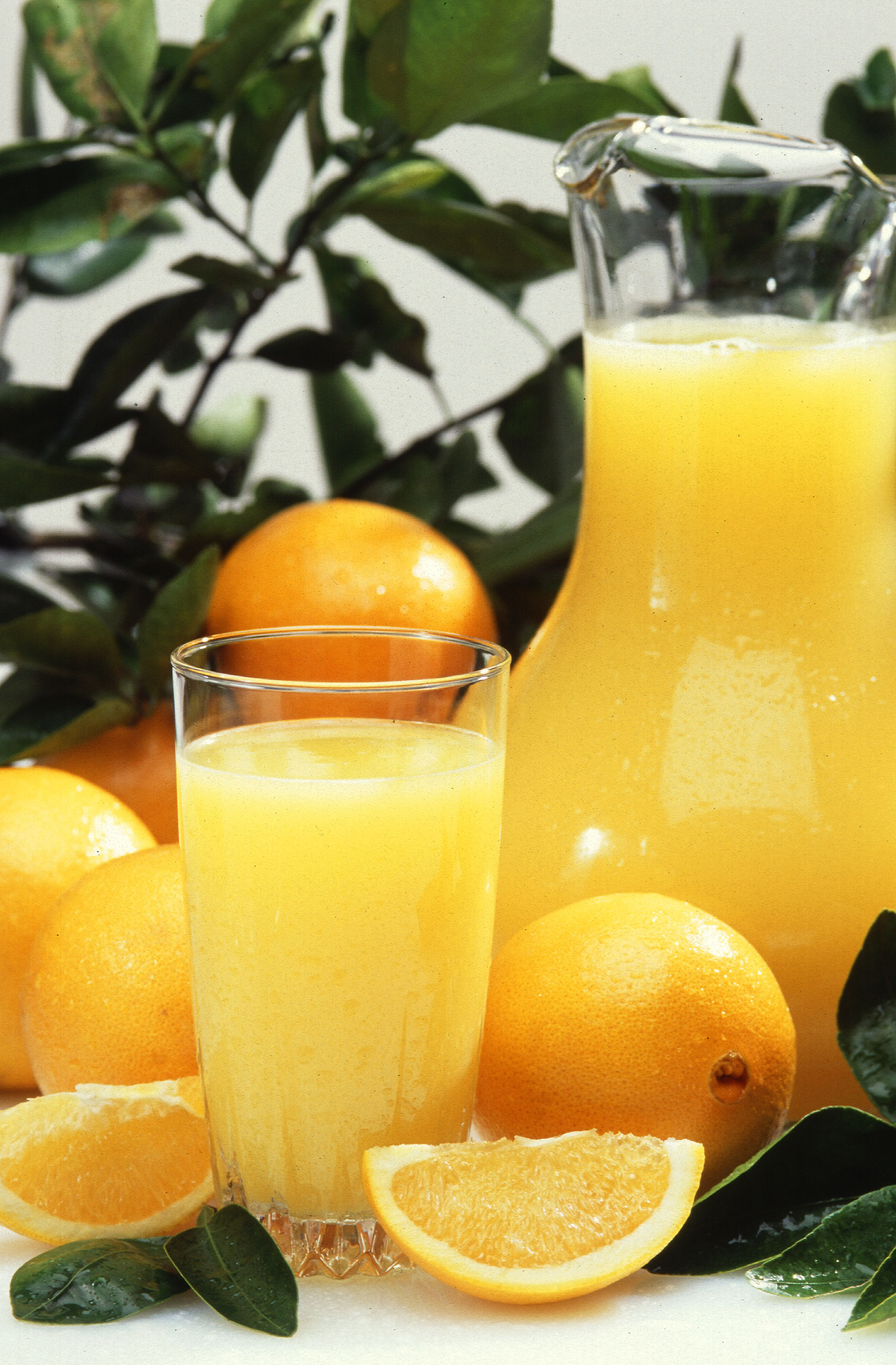
Orange juice is usually served cold.

Fruit juice is a natural product that contains few or no additives. Citrus products such as orange juice and tangerine juice are familiar breakfast drinks, while grapefruit juice, pineapple, apple, grape, lime, and lemon juice are also common. Coconut water is a highly nutritious and refreshing juice. Many kinds of berries are crushed; their juices are mixed with water and sometimes sweetened. Raspberry, blackberry and currants are popular juice drinks but the percentage of water also determines their nutritive value. Grape juice allowed to ferment produces wine.

Fruits are highly perishable so the ability to extract juices and store them was of significant value. Some fruits are highly acidic and mixing them with water and sugars or honey was often necessary to make them palatable. Fruits can also be blended with ice and other ingredients to make a smoothie. Early storage of fruit juices was labor-intensive, requiring the crushing of the fruits and the mixing of the resulting pure juices with sugars before bottling.

Type of fruit drink	Percentage of fruit needed in drink	Description
Fruit juice	100%	Largely regulated throughout the world; 'juice' is often protected to be used for only 100% fruit.
Fruit juice concentrate	100%	Water removed from fruit juice by heating or freezing.
Fruit nectar	30%	Mixture of fruit pulp, sugar and water which is consumed as 'one shot'.
Fruit punch	25%	A mixture of fruit juices. Contains around 65% sugar.
Fruit squash	25%	Produced using strained fruit juice, 45% sugar and preservatives.
Fruit drink	10%	Fruit is liquefied and water added.
Fruit cordial	0%	All 'suspended matter' is eliminated by filtration or clarification. and therefore appears clear This type of drink, if described as 'flavoured,' may not have any amount of fruit.
Carbonated fruit drink	-	Carbon dioxide added to fruit drink.
Fruit sherbet	-	Cooled drink of sweetened diluted fruit juice.
Fruit syrup	-	1 fruit crushed into puree and left to ferment. Is then heated with sugar to create syrup.

Vegetable juices are usually served warm or cold. Different types of vegetables can be used to make vegetable juice such as carrots, tomatoes, cucumbers, celery and many more. Some vegetable juices are mixed with some fruit juice to make the vegetable juice taste better. Many popular vegetable juices, particularly ones with high tomato content, are high in sodium, and therefore consumption of them for health must be carefully considered. Some vegetable juices provide the same health benefits as whole vegetables in terms of reducing risks of cardiovascular disease and cancer.

Plant milk is a general term for any milk-like product that is derived from a plant source. The most common varieties internationally are soy milk, almond milk, rice milk, coconut milk and oat milk.

=== Sleep drinks ===
A nightcap is a drink taken shortly before bedtime to induce sleep. For example, a small alcoholic drink or a cup of warm milk can supposedly promote a good night's sleep. Today, most nightcaps and relaxation drinks are generally non-alcoholic beverages containing calming ingredients. They are considered beverages that serve to relax a person. Unlike other calming beverages, such as tea, warm milk or milk with honey, relaxation drinks almost universally contain more than one active ingredient. Relaxation drinks have been known to contain other natural ingredients and are usually free of caffeine and alcohol but some have claimed to contain marijuana.

=== Alcoholic drinks ===
A drink is considered "alcoholic" if it contains ethanol, commonly known as alcohol (although in chemistry the definition of "alcohol" includes many other compounds). Beer has been a part of human civilisation for around 8,000 years.

==== Beer ====
Beer is an alcoholic drink produced by the saccharification of starch and fermentation of the resulting sugar. The starch and saccharification enzymes are often derived from malted cereal grains, most commonly malted barley and malted wheat. Most beer is also flavoured with hops, which add bitterness and act as a natural preservative, though other flavourings such as herbs or fruit may occasionally be included. The preparation of beer is called brewing. Beer is the world's most widely consumed alcoholic drink. It is said to have been discovered by goddess Ninkasi around 5300 BCE, when she accidentally discovered yeast after leaving grain in jars that were later rained upon and left for several days. Women have been the chief creators of beer throughout history due to its association with domesticity and it, throughout much of history, being brewed in the home for family consumption. Only in recent history have men begun to dabble in the field. It is thought by some to be the oldest fermented drink.

Some of humanity's earliest known writings refer to the production and distribution of beer: the Code of Hammurabi included laws regulating beer and beer parlours, and "The Hymn to Ninkasi", a prayer to the Mesopotamian goddess of beer, served as both a prayer and as a method of remembering the recipe for beer in a culture with few literate people. Today, the brewing industry is a global business, consisting of several dominant multinational companies and many thousands of smaller producers ranging from brewpubs to regional breweries.

==== Cider ====
Cider is a fermented alcoholic drink made from fruit juice, most commonly and traditionally apple juice, but also the juice of peaches, pears ("Perry" cider) or other fruit. Cider may be made from any variety of apple, but certain cultivars grown solely for use in cider are known as cider apples. The United Kingdom has the highest per capita consumption of cider, as well as the largest cider-producing companies in the world, As of 2006, the U.K. produces 600 million litres of cider each year (130 million imperial gallons).

==== Wine ====
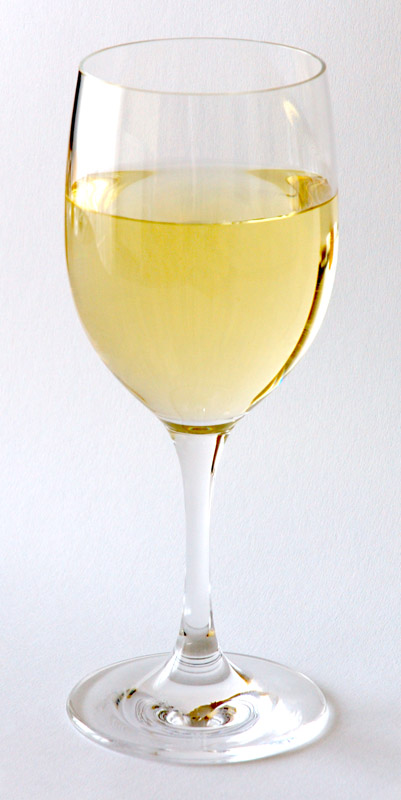
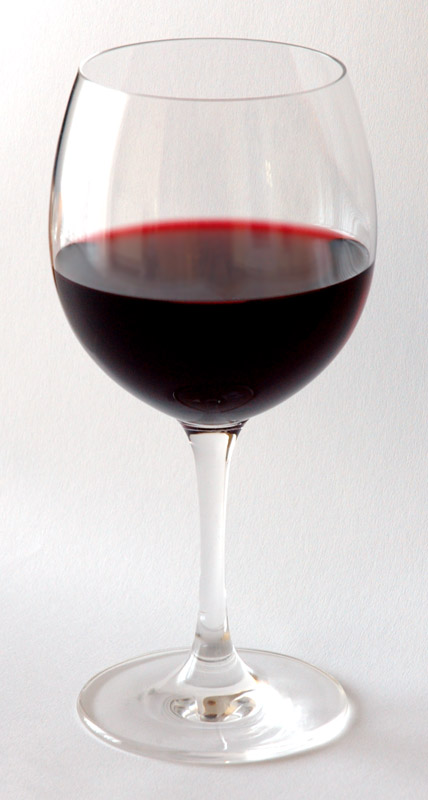
Wine glasses with white wine and red wine

Wine is an alcoholic drink made from fermented grapes or other fruits. The natural chemical balance of grapes lets them ferment without the addition of sugars, acids, enzymes, water, or other nutrients. Yeast consumes the sugars in the grapes and converts them into alcohol and carbon dioxide. Different varieties of grapes and strains of yeasts produce different styles of wine. The well-known variations result from the very complex interactions between the biochemical development of the fruit, reactions involved in fermentation, terroir and subsequent appellation, along with human intervention in the overall process. The final product may contain tens of thousands of chemical compounds in amounts varying from a few percent to a few parts per billion.

Wines made from produce besides grapes are usually named after the product from which they are produced (for example, rice wine, pomegranate wine, apple wine and elderberry wine) and are generically called fruit wine. The term "wine" can also refer to starch-fermented or fortified drinks having higher alcohol content, such as barley wine, huangjiu, or sake.

Wine has a rich history dating back thousands of years, with the earliest production so far discovered having occurred c. 6000 BC in Georgia. It had reached the Balkans by c. 4500 BC and was consumed and celebrated in ancient Greece and Rome.

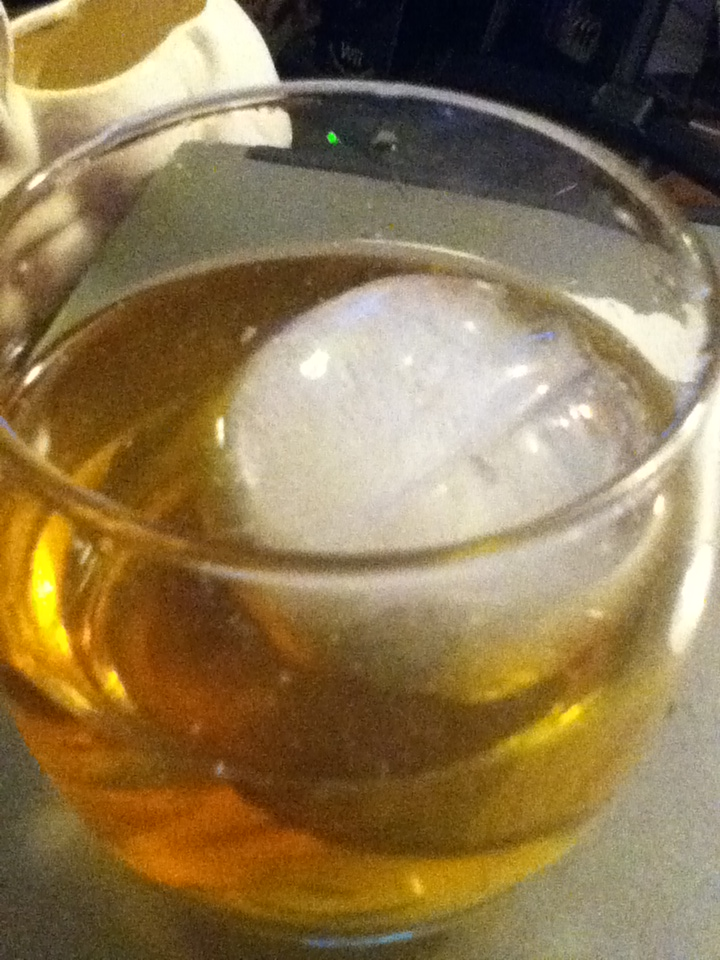
Whiskey served "on the rocks"

From its earliest appearance in written records, wine has also played an important role in religion. Red wine was closely associated with blood by the ancient Egyptians, who, according to Plutarch, avoided its free consumption as late as the 7th-century BC Saite dynasty, "thinking it to be the blood of those who had once battled against the gods". The Greek cult and mysteries of Dionysus, carried on by the Romans in their Bacchanalia, were the origins of western theater. Judaism incorporates it in the Kiddush and Christianity in its Eucharist, while alcohol consumption was forbidden in Islam.

==== Spirits ====
Spirits are distilled beverages that contain no added sugar and have at least 20% alcohol by volume (ABV). Popular spirits include borovička, brandy, gin, rum, slivovitz, tequila, vodka, and whisky. Brandy is a spirit created by distilling wine, whilst vodka may be distilled from any starch- or sugar-rich plant matter; most vodka today is produced from grains such as sorghum, corn, rye, or wheat.

== In culture ==
=== Places to drink ===
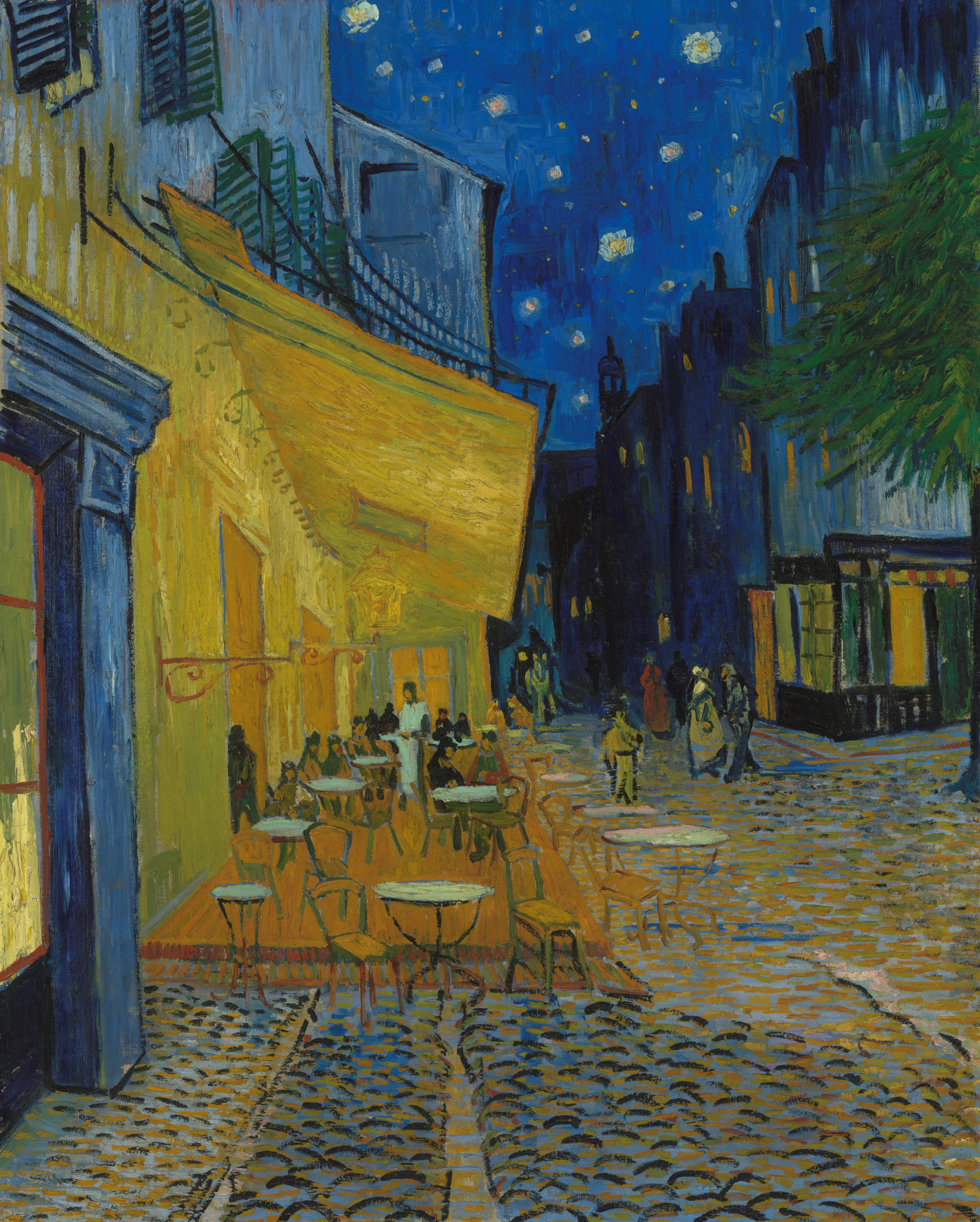
Cafe Terrace at Night, September 1888, by Vincent van Gogh

Throughout history, people have come together in establishments to socialise whilst drinking. This includes cafés and coffeehouses, which focus on providing hot drinks as well as light snacks. Many coffee houses in the Middle East, and in West Asian immigrant districts in the Western world, offer shisha (nargile in Turkish and Greek), flavored tobacco smoked through a hookah. Espresso bars are a type of coffeehouse that specialize in serving espresso and espresso-based drinks.

In China and Japan, the establishment would be a tea house, where people would socialise while drinking tea. Chinese scholars have used the teahouse as a place to share ideas.

Alcoholic drinks are served in drinking establishments, which have different cultural connotations. For example, pubs are fundamental to the culture of The United Kingdom, Ireland, Australia, Canada, New England, Metro Detroit, South Africa and New Zealand. In many places, especially in villages, a pub can be the focal point of the community. The writings of Samuel Pepys describe the pub as the heart of England. Many pubs are controlled by breweries, so cask ale or keg beer may be a better value than wines and spirits.

In contrast, types of bars range from seedy bars or nightclubs, sometimes termed "dive bars", to elegant places of entertainment for the elite. Bars provide stools or chairs that are placed at tables or counters for their patrons. The term "bar" is derived from the specialized counter on which drinks are served. Some bars have entertainment on a stage, such as a live band, comedians, go-go dancers, or strippers. Patrons may sit or stand at the bar and be served by the bartender, or they may sit at tables and be served by cocktail servers.

=== Matching with food ===
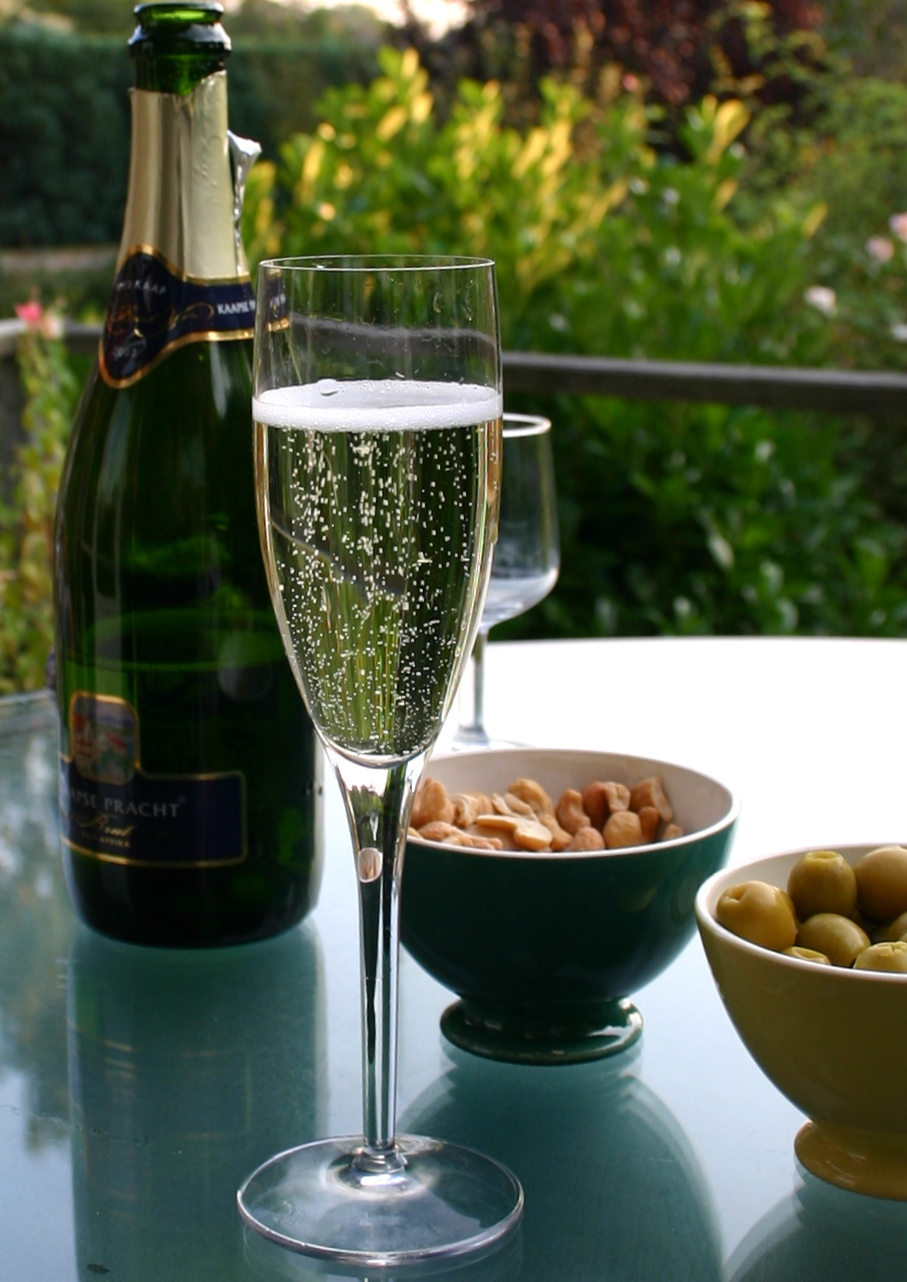
Champagne flute and bottle

Food and drink are often paired together to enhance the taste experience. This primarily happens with wine and a culture has grown up around the process. Weight, flavors and textures can either be contrasted or complemented. In recent years, food magazines began to suggest particular wines with recipes and restaurants would offer multi-course dinners matched with a specific wine for each course.

=== Presentation ===
Different drinks have unique receptacles for their consumption. This is sometimes purely for presentation purposes, such as for cocktails. In other situations, the drinkware has practical application, such as coffee cups which are designed for insulation or brandy snifters which are designed to encourage evaporation but trap the aroma within the glass.

Many glasses include a stem, which allows the drinker to hold the glass without affecting the temperature of the drink. In champagne glasses, the bowl is designed to retain champagne's signature carbonation by reducing the surface area at the opening of the bowl. Historically, champagne has been served in a champagne coupe, the shape of which allowed carbonation to dissipate even more rapidly than from a standard wine glass.

== Commercial trade ==
=== International exports and imports ===
An important export commodity, coffee was the top agricultural export for twelve countries in 2004, and it was the world's seventh-largest legal agricultural export by value in 2005. Green (unroasted) coffee is one of the most traded agricultural commodities in the world.

=== Investment ===
Some drinks, such as wine, can be used as an alternative investment. This can be achieved by either purchasing and reselling individual bottles or cases of particular wines, or purchasing shares in an investment wine fund that pools investors' capital.

== See also ==
- List of beverages
- List of hot drinks
- List of national drinks
- List of food and drink monuments
- Sweetened beverage

== Bibliography ==
- Kummer, Corby (August 19, 2003). The Joy of Coffee: The Essential guide to Buying, Brewing, and Enjoying. Boston: Houghton Mifflin. ISBN 978-0-618-30240-6.
