= C6H12N2O3 =

The molecular formula C_{6}H_{12}N_{2}O_{3} (molar mass: 160.17 g/mol, exact mass: 160.0848 u) may refer to:

- Daminozide
- Gamma-Glutamylmethylamide
