= Selenotransferase =

A selenotransferase, or selenium transferase, is a transferase enzyme that act upon atoms of selenium.

== Types ==
- L-seryl-tRNA^{Sec} selenium transferase (EC 2.9.1.1) – enzyme found in bacteria
- O-phosphoseryl-tRNA^{Sec} selenium transferase (EC 2.9.1.2) – enzyme found in Eukaryotes and Arcaea
