= Succinate—hydroxymethylglutarate CoA-transferase =

Class of enzymes

Succinate-hydroxymethylglutarate CoA-transferase

Identifiers
- EC no.: 2.8.3.13
- CAS no.: 80237-90-7

Databases
- BRENDA: enzyme data
- ExPASy: NiceZyme view
- KEGG: enzyme entry
- MetaCyc: metabolic pathway
- Rhea: reactions
- PDB structures: RCSB PDB PDBe PDBsum
- Gene Ontology: AmiGO / QuickGO
Search
- PMC: articles
- PubMed: articles
- NCBI: proteins

Succinate-hydroxymethylglutarate CoA-transferase (EC 2.8.3.13) is an enzyme that catalyzes the chemical reaction

meglutol
+
succinyl-CoA
HMG-CoA
+
succinic acid

The two substrates of this enzyme characterised from rat liver are meglutol and succinic-CoA. Its products are HMG-CoA and succinic acid.

This enzyme is a transferase, specifically a CoA-transferase. The systematic name of this enzyme class is succinyl-CoA:3-hydroxy-3-methylglutarate CoA-transferase. Other names in common use include hydroxymethylglutarate coenzyme A-transferase, and dicarboxyl-CoA:dicarboxylic acid coenzyme A transferase.
