= Oximinotransferase =

oximinotransferase

Identifiers
- EC no.: 2.6.3.1
- CAS no.: 9030-49-3

Databases
- IntEnz: IntEnz view
- BRENDA: BRENDA entry
- ExPASy: NiceZyme view
- KEGG: KEGG entry
- MetaCyc: metabolic pathway
- PRIAM: profile
- PDB structures: RCSB PDB PDBe PDBsum
- Gene Ontology: AmiGO / QuickGO
Search
- PMC: articles
- PubMed: articles
- NCBI: proteins

In enzymology, an oximinotransferase (EC 2.6.3.1) is an enzyme that catalyzes the chemical reaction

pyruvate oxime + acetone $\rightleftharpoons$ pyruvate + acetone oxime

Thus, the two substrates of this enzyme are pyruvate oxime and acetone, whereas its two products are pyruvate and acetone oxime.

This enzyme belongs to the family of transferases, specifically those transferring nitrogenous groups oximinotransferases. The systematic name of this enzyme class is pyruvate-oxime:acetone oximinotransferase. Other names in common use include transoximinase, oximase, pyruvate-acetone oximinotransferase, and transoximase.
