= Mesopontine tegmentum =

The mesopontine tegmentum refers to an area of tissue that lies at the junction of mesencephalon and the pons. The dorsal area of this is the pontine tegmentum.

The region contains cholinergic neurons.

== See also ==
- Tegmentum
- mesopontine tegmental anesthesia area (MPTA)
