= 3-oxoacid CoA-transferase =

Enzyme family

3-oxoacid CoA-transferase (SCOT)
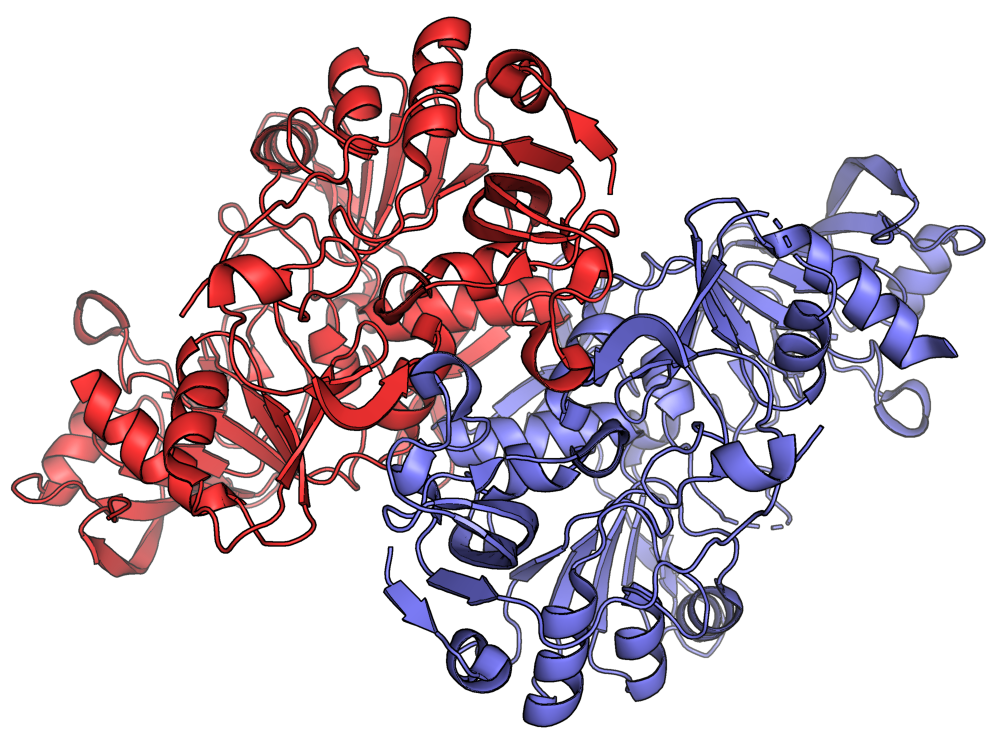
- Pig succinyl-CoA 3-oxoacid transferase PDB: 3K6M

Identifiers
- EC no.: 2.8.3.5
- CAS no.: 9027-43-4

Databases
- IntEnz: IntEnz view
- BRENDA: BRENDA entry
- ExPASy: NiceZyme view
- KEGG: KEGG entry
- MetaCyc: metabolic pathway
- PRIAM: profile
- PDB structures: RCSB PDB PDBe PDBsum
- Gene Ontology: AmiGO / QuickGO
Search
- PMC: articles
- PubMed: articles
- NCBI: proteins

In enzymology, a 3-oxoacid CoA-transferase (EC 2.8.3.5) is an enzyme that catalyzes the chemical reaction

succinyl-CoA + a 3-oxo acid $\rightleftharpoons$ succinate + a 3-oxoacyl-CoA

Thus, the two substrates of this enzyme are succinyl-CoA and 3-oxo acid, whereas its two products are succinate and 3-oxoacyl-CoA.

This enzyme belongs to the family of transferases, specifically the CoA-transferases. The systematic name of this enzyme class is succinyl-CoA:3-oxo-acid CoA-transferase. Other names in common use include succinyl-CoA-3-ketoacid-CoA transferase, 3-oxoacid coenzyme A-transferase, 3-ketoacid CoA-transferase, 3-ketoacid coenzyme A transferase, 3-oxo-CoA transferase, 3-oxoacid CoA dehydrogenase, acetoacetate succinyl-CoA transferase, acetoacetyl coenzyme A-succinic thiophorase, succinyl coenzyme A-acetoacetyl coenzyme A-transferase, and succinyl-CoA transferase. This enzyme participates in 3 metabolic pathways: synthesis and degradation of ketone bodies, valine, leucine and isoleucine degradation, and butanoate metabolism.

This protein may use the morpheein model of allosteric regulation.

== Structural studies ==
As of late 2007, 7 structures have been solved for this class of enzymes, with PDB accession codes 1M3E, 1O9L, 1OOY, 1OOZ, 1OPE, 2NRB, and 2NRC.
