= Glycine dehydrogenase (cytochrome) =

Catalyzing enzyme

glycine dehydrogenase (cytochrome)

Identifiers
- EC no.: 1.4.2.1
- CAS no.: 9075-55-2

Databases
- IntEnz: IntEnz view
- BRENDA: BRENDA entry
- ExPASy: NiceZyme view
- KEGG: KEGG entry
- MetaCyc: metabolic pathway
- PRIAM: profile
- PDB structures: RCSB PDB PDBe PDBsum
- Gene Ontology: AmiGO / QuickGO
Search
- PMC: articles
- PubMed: articles
- NCBI: proteins

In enzymology, glycine dehydrogenase (cytochrome) (EC 1.4.2.1) is an enzyme that catalyzes the chemical reaction

glycine
+ 2 ferricytochrome c
H_{2}O
2 H^{+}
H_{2}O
2 H^{+}
glyoxylic acid
+ 2 ferrocytochrome c + NH_{3}

The three substrates of this enzyme are glycine, water, and ferricytochrome c. Its products are glyoxylic acid, ammonia, ferrocytochrome c, and two protons.

This enzyme belongs to the family of oxidoreductases, specifically those acting on the CH-NH_{2} group of donors with a cytochrome as acceptor. The systematic name of this enzyme class is glycine:ferricytochrome-c oxidoreductase (deaminating). This enzyme is also called glycine---cytochrome c reductase. This enzyme participates in glycine, serine and threonine metabolism.
