= Pentosyltransferase =

Type of glycosyltransferase

Pentosyltransferases are a type of glycosyltransferase that catalyze the transfer of a pentose.

Examples include:

- adenine phosphoribosyltransferase
- hypoxanthine-guanine phosphoribosyltransferase
- pertussis toxin
- poly ADP ribose polymerase

They are classified under EC number 2.4.2.
