= Glycine dehydrogenase (cyanide-forming) =

glycine dehydrogenase (cyanide-forming)

Identifiers
- EC no.: 1.4.99.5

Databases
- IntEnz: IntEnz view
- BRENDA: BRENDA entry
- ExPASy: NiceZyme view
- KEGG: KEGG entry
- MetaCyc: metabolic pathway
- PRIAM: profile
- PDB structures: RCSB PDB PDBe PDBsum
- Gene Ontology: AmiGO / QuickGO
Search
- PMC: articles
- PubMed: articles
- NCBI: proteins

In enzymology, glycine dehydrogenase (cyanide-forming) (EC 1.4.99.5) is an enzyme that catalyzes the chemical reaction

glycine
+ 2 electron acceptor
CO_{2}
CO_{2}
hydrogen cyanide
+ 2 reduced acceptor

The two substrates of this enzyme are glycine and an electron acceptor. Its products are hydrogen cyanide, carbon dioxide, and reduced acceptor.

This enzyme belongs to the family of oxidoreductases, specifically those acting on the CH-NH_{2} group of donors with other acceptors. The systematic name of this enzyme class is glycine:acceptor oxidoreductase (hydrogen-cyanide-forming). Other names in common use include hydrogen cyanide synthase, and HCN synthase.
