= OXCT1 =

Protein-coding gene in the species Homo sapiens

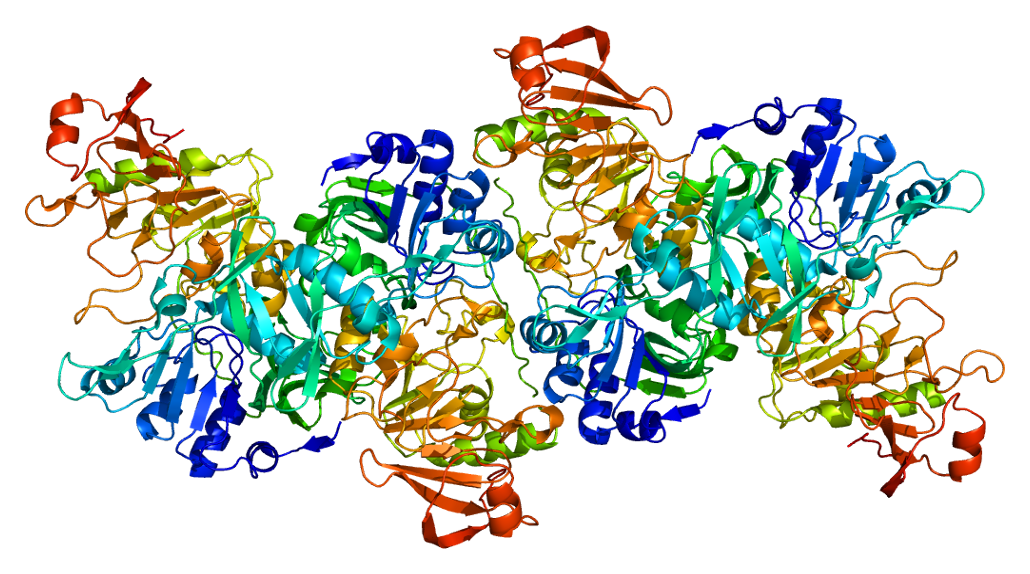
Available structures
PDB	Ortholog search: PDBe RCSB
PDB	List of PDB id codes 3DLX

Identifiers
- Aliases: OXCT1, OXCT, SCOT, 3-oxoacid CoA-transferase 1
- External IDs: OMIM: 601424; MGI: 1914291; HomoloGene: 377; GeneCards: OXCT1; OMA:OXCT1 - orthologs

Gene location (Human)
Chr.	Chromosome 5 (human)
Band	5p13.1	Start	41,730,065 bp
Band	5p13.1	End	41,870,519 bp

Gene location (Mouse)
Chr.	Chromosome 15 (mouse)
Band	15|15 A1	Start	4,055,865 bp
Band	15|15 A1	End	4,184,826 bp
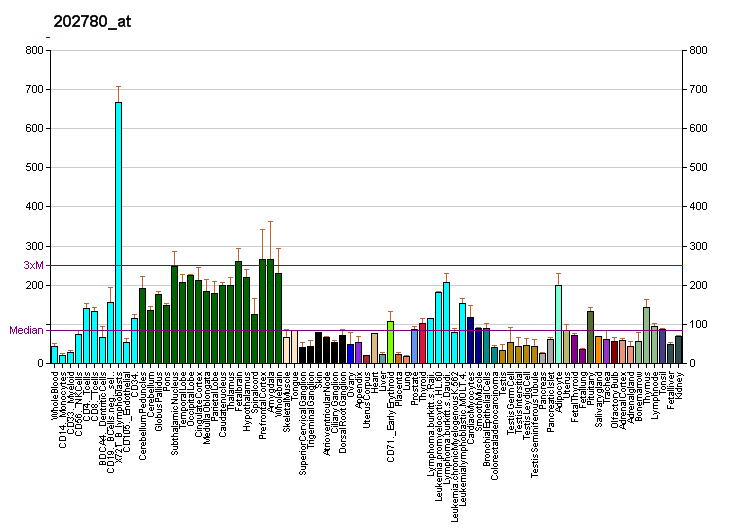
RNA expression pattern
Bgee	Human / Mouse (ortholog); Top expressed in: myocardium of left ventricle; right ventricle; endothelial cell; middle temporal gyrus; cardiac muscle tissue of right atrium; Achilles tendon; orbitofrontal cortex; Brodmann area 46; superior frontal gyrus; postcentral gyrus / Top expressed in: epithelium of stomach; myocardium of ventricle; human kidney; tunica media of zone of aorta; medial dorsal nucleus; lateral septal nucleus; Rostral migratory stream; lateral geniculate nucleus; digastric muscle; hair follicle; More reference expression data
BioGPS	More reference expression data
Gene ontology
Molecular function	transferase activity; protein homodimerization activity; 3-oxoacid CoA-transferase activity; CoA-transferase activity
Cellular component	mitochondrial matrix; mitochondrion; nucleoplasm
Biological process	response to nutrient; response to activity; development of the heart; brain development; ketone body catabolic process; response to starvation; response to hormone; adipose tissue development; ketone catabolic process; positive regulation of insulin secretion involved in cellular response to glucose stimulus; metabolism; response to ethanol; cellular ketone body metabolic process
Sources:Amigo / QuickGO
Orthologs
Species	Human	Mouse
Entrez	5019	67041
Ensembl	ENSG00000083720	ENSMUSG00000022186
UniProt	P55809	Q9D0K2
RefSeq (mRNA)	NM_000436	NM_024188
RefSeq (protein)	NP_000427; NP_001351228; NP_001351229; NP_001351230; NP_001351231 NP_001351232	NP_077150
Location (UCSC)	Chr 5: 41.73 – 41.87 Mb	Chr 15: 4.06 – 4.18 Mb
PubMed search
- Wikidata
View/Edit Human	View/Edit Mouse

3-oxoacid CoA-transferase 1 (OXCT1) is an enzyme that in humans is encoded by the OXCT1 gene. It is also known as succinyl-CoA-3-oxaloacid CoA transferase (SCOT). Mutations in the OXCT1 gene are associated with succinyl-CoA:3-oxoacid CoA transferase deficiency. This gene encodes a member of the 3-oxoacid CoA-transferase gene family. The encoded protein is a homodimeric mitochondrial matrix enzyme that plays a central role in extrahepatic ketone body catabolism by catalyzing the reversible transfer of coenzyme A (CoA) from succinyl-CoA to acetoacetate.

== Structure ==
=== Gene ===
The OXCT1 gene resides on chromosome 5 at the band 5p13. OXCT1 spans a length of over 100 kb and includes 17 exons.

=== Protein ===
The crystal structure of human OXCT1 reveals it to be a homodimer with two active sites. Each of its monomers contains N- and C-terminal domains that share an α/β structural fold characteristic of CoA transferase family I members. These terminal domains are joined by a linker region and form the enzyme's active site. Specifically, the conserved residue Glu344 within the active site is responsible for the enzyme's catalytic function by attacking the succinyl-CoA substrate, leading to the formation of the enzyme-CoA thioester intermediate.

== Function ==
OXCT1 is a member of the CoA transferase family I, which is known to catalyze the transfer of CoA between carboxylic acid groups. In particular, OXCT1 catalyzes the first, rate-limiting step in ketolysis by transferring the CoA from succinyl-CoA to acetoacetate, giving acetoacetyl-CoA (AcAc-CoA). The product AcAc-CoA can then be converted by acetoacetyl-CoA thiolase into acetyl-CoA, which enters the citric acid cycle to generate energy for the cell. As a result, OXCT1 allows cells to utilize energy stored in ketone bodies synthesized by the liver during conditions of energy deficiency, such as low glucose levels. In addition, OXCT1 activity leads to the formation of Acetyl-CoA, which serves as a precursor for short-chain acyl-CoAs and lipids in the cytosol.

OXCT1 is found in the mitochondrial matrix of all tissues except the liver, though it is most abundantly expressed in heart, brain, and kidney tissue. Considering that liver cells function in ketogenesis and OXCT1 in ketolysis, OXCT1 may be absent from the liver to allow ketone body formation to proceed.

== Clinical Significance ==
=== Metabolic disorders ===
SCOT deficiency is a rare autosomal recessive metabolic disorder that can lead to recurrent episodes of ketoacidosis and even permanent ketosis. Twenty-four mutations in the human OXCT1 gene have been identified and associated with SCOT deficiency: three nonsense mutations, two insertion mutations, and 19 missense mutations. These mutations alter OXCT1 form and thus function in various ways, and they determine what phenotypic complications a patient may present. For instance, several missense mutations that substitute bulkier or charged residues hinder proper folding of OXCT1, leading to more severe outcomes such as permanent acidosis.

OXCT1 has also been implicated diabetes. In a study by MacDonald et al., OXCT1 activity was shown to be lower by 92% in pancreatic islets of human patients with type 2 diabetes compared to those in healthy patients, though the cause is currently unknown.

=== Cancer ===
Since OXCT1 functions in metabolizing ketone bodies, it has been proposed to promote tumor growth by providing tumor cells with an additional energy source. Therefore, ketone inhibitors may prove effective in treating patients experiencing recurring and metastatic tumors. A proteomics study identified OXCT1 to be one of 16 proteins upregulated in carcinoma HepG2 cells treated with Platycodin D, an anti-cancer agent.

== See also ==
- Succinyl-CoA:3-oxoacid CoA transferase deficiency
