= Succinyl-CoA:3-oxoacid CoA transferase deficiency =

- Other names: SCOT deficiency
- Succinyl-CoA:3-oxoacid CoA transferase deficiency is inherited via autosomal recessive manner
- Frequency: 0.0001%

Succinyl-CoA:3-oxoacid CoA transferase deficiency is an inborn error of ketone body utilization. Succinyl-CoA:3-oxoacid CoA transferase catalyzes the transfer of coenzyme A from succinyl-coenzyme A to acetoacetate. It can be caused by mutation in the OXCT1 gene.

First described in 1972, there are 34 known people to have been reported in the medical literature with this inborn error of metabolism. They experience attacks of ketoacidosis during illness, and even when well may have elevated levels of ketone bodies in blood and urine (ketonemia and ketonuria, respectively). Not all people with SCOT deficiency have persistent ketonemia and ketonuria, particularly those with milder defects of enzyme activity.
