= Theanine =

Amino acid

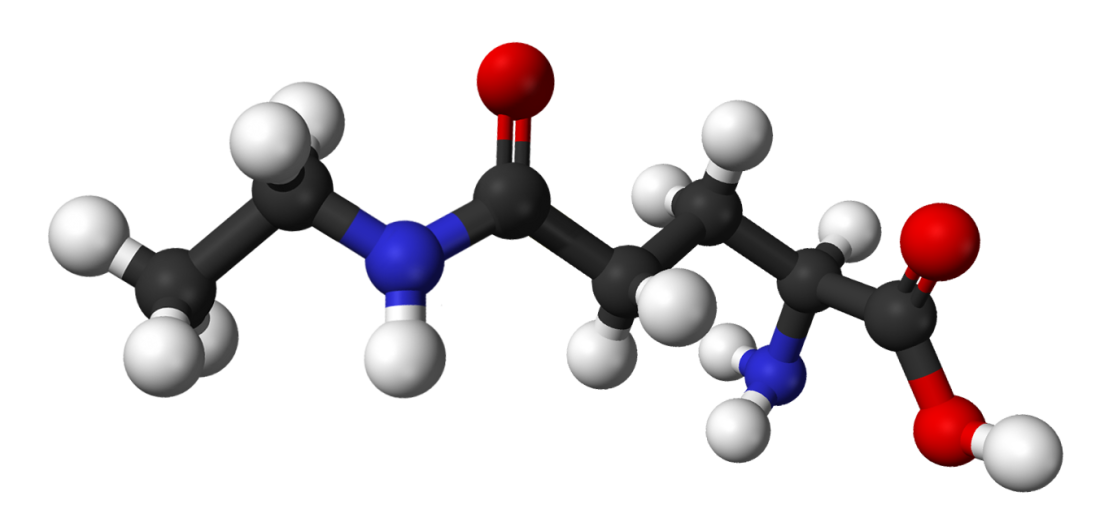
- L-Theanine

Clinical data
- Other names: γ-L-Glutamylethylamide
- Dependence liability: None
- Routes of administration: Oral
- ATC code: none

Legal status
- Legal status: US: OTC; UN: Unscheduled

Pharmacokinetic data
- Onset of action: ~1 hour
- Elimination half-life: Capsule: ~1.2 hours Green Tea: ~0.8 hours

Identifiers
- IUPAC name: (2S)-2-Ammonio-5-(ethylamino)-5-oxopentanoate or N-Ethyl-L-glutamine
- CAS Number: 3081-61-6
- PubChem CID: 439378
- DrugBank: DB12444
- ChemSpider: 388498
- UNII: 8021PR16QO
- KEGG: C01047
- ChEBI: CHEBI:17394
- ChEMBL: ChEMBL3039113
- CompTox Dashboard (EPA): DTXSID80184817
- ECHA InfoCard: 100.019.436

Chemical and physical data
- Formula: C_{7}H_{14}N_{2}O_{3}
- Molar mass: 174.200 g·mol^{−1}
- 3D model (JSmol): Interactive image; Interactive image
- Melting point: 174.20 °C (345.56 °F)
- Boiling point: 215 °C (419 °F)
- SMILES: CCNC(=O)CC[C@H](N)C(=O)O; CCNC(=O)CCC(N)C(O)=O
- InChI: InChI=1S/C7H14N2O3/c1-2-9-6(10)4-3-5(8)7(11)12/h5H,2-4,8H2,1H3,(H,9,10)(H,11,12); Key:DATAGRPVKZEWHA-UHFFFAOYSA-N

Theanine /ˈθiːəniːn/, also known as L-γ-glutamylethylamide, N^{5}-ethyl-L-glutamine, or γ-glutamylethylamide, is a bioactive, non-proteinogenic amino acid similar to the proteinogenic amino acids glutamic acid and L-glutamine. It is produced by certain plants such as the tea plant (Camellia sinensis), and by some fungi. Theanine was discovered in 1949 as a constituent of green tea and was isolated in 1950 from gyokuro tea leaves. Theanine constitutes about 1–2% of the dry weight of green tea leaves.

Theanine is sold as a dietary supplement. It is packaged in gelatin capsules, tablets, and as a powder, and may be an ingredient in branded supplements with caffeine. It is also used as an ingredient in food and beverages. Japan approved its unlimited use in all foods (including chocolates, soft drinks, and herb teas) except infant food in 1964, and the US Food and Drug Administration has considered it safe at doses up to 250 milligrams (mg) per serving since 2007.

In 2011, the European Food Safety Authority found there was insufficient evidence for a causal relationship between theanine consumption and improved cognitive function, alleviation of psychological stress, maintenance of normal sleep, or reduction of menstrual discomfort. A 2025 review found that theanine has been poorly studied to date, having inconsistent research quality and unreliable clinical trials.

== Structure and properties ==
The chemical name N^{5}-ethyl-L-glutamine and other synonyms (see box) for theanine reflect its chemical structure. The name theanine, without prefix, is generally understood to imply the L- (S-) enantiomer, derived from the related proteinogenic L-amino acid glutamic acid. Theanine is an analog of this amino acid, and its primary amide, L-glutamine (also a proteinogenic amino acid). Theanine is a derivative of glutamine that is ethylated on the amide nitrogen (as the name N^{5}-ethyl-L-glutamine describes), or alternatively, to the amide formed from ethylamine and L-glutamic acid at its γ- (5-) side chain carboxylic acid group (as the name γ-L-glutamylethylamide describes).

Relative to theanine, the opposite (D-, R-) enantiomer is largely absent from the literature, except implicitly. While natural extracts that are not harshly treated are presumed to contain only the biosynthetic L- enantiomeric form, mishandled isolates and racemic chemical preparations of theanines necessarily contain both theanine and its D-enantiomer (and from racemic syntheses, in equal proportion), and studies have suggested that the D-isomer may actually predominate in some commercial supplement preparations. Amino acid racemization in aqueous media is a well-established chemical process promoted by elevated temperature and non-neutral pH values; prolonged heating of Camellia extracts—possible for oversteeped teas and in undisclosed commercial preparative processes—has been reported to result in increasing racemization of theanine to give increasing proportions of the nonnatural D-theanine, up to equal proportions of each enantiomer.

== Discovery and distribution ==
Theanine is found primarily in plant and fungal species. It was discovered as a constituent of tea (Camellia sinensis) in 1949, and in 1950 a laboratory in Kyoto successfully isolated it from gyokuro leaf, which has high theanine content. Theanine is substantially present in black, green, and white teas from Camellia sinensis in quantities of about 1% of the dry weight. Deliberately shading tea plants from direct sunlight, as is done for matcha and gyokuro green tea, increases L-theanine content. The L-enantiomer is the form found in freshly prepared teas and some human dietary supplements.

== Digestion and metabolism ==
As a structural analog of glutamate and glutamine, the theanine in teas or supplements is absorbed in the small intestine after oral ingestion; its hydrolysis to L-glutamate and ethylamine occur both in the intestine and liver, possibly functioning as a donor for glutamate synthesis.

== In vitro ==
Theanine is structurally similar to the excitatory neurotransmitter glutamate and binds to glutamate receptors in vitro, though with much lower affinity in comparison. Specifically, it binds to ionotropic glutamate receptors in the micromolar range, including the AMPA and kainate receptors and, to a lesser extent, the NMDA receptor. It acts as an antagonist of the former two sites, and a partial co-agonist of the NMDA receptors. In vitro, theanine also binds to group I mGluRs. In addition, it inhibits glutamine transporters and glutamate transporters, and thus blocks the reuptake of glutamine and glutamate.

Theanine may elicit umami taste, a consequence potentially associated with binding to and activation of the T1R1 + T1R3 heterodimer or umami (savory) taste receptor.

== Regulatory status ==
The regulatory status of theanine varies by country. It is sold as a dietary supplement across the United States and European Union. In Japan, L-theanine has been approved for use in all foods, with some restrictions in the case of infant foods. In the United States, the FDA considers it to be generally recognized as safe (GRAS) and allows its use as an ingredient in foods and beverages up to a maximum of 250 mg per serving.

In 2003, the German Federal Institute for Risk Assessment (Bundesinstitut für Risikobewertung, BfR), an agency of their Federal Ministry of Food and Agriculture, objected to the addition of isolated theanine to beverages. While it was estimated the quantity of green tea consumed by the average Japanese tea drinker per day contains about 20 mg of the substance, there were no studies measuring the amount of theanine being extracted by typical preparation methods, or the percentage lost by discarding the first infusion. Therefore, with the Japanese being exposed to possibly much less than 20 mg per day, it was the opinion of the BfR that pharmacological reactions to drinks typically containing 50 mg of theanine per 500 milliliters could not be excluded –reactions such as impairment of psychomotor skills and amplification of the sedating effects of alcohol and hypnotics.

On November 13, 2023, an Inspection by the Administration of Food Safety, Veterinary Medicine and Plant Protection of the Republic of Slovenia banned the sale of Prime energy drinks in Slovenia as they contain L-theanine, which is not allowed in non-alcoholic beverages. Prime Hydration may be freely sold.

== Research on supplement use ==
Theanine supplements have been marketed with a variety of claims that they improve cognitive performance, reduce stress, improve sleep quality, and alleviate menstrual cramps. Evaluating these claims in 2011, the European Food Safety Authority assessed they were not supported by evidence in studies provided at that time.

A 2020 review of studies suggested that L-theanine supplementation of 200–400 milligrams per day may reduce stress and anxiety in people with acute stress, but there was insufficient evidence for the use of L-theanine as a medication to treat stress and anxiety. A 2024 review indicated that L-theanine supplementation may be more effective than placebo in alleviating psychopathological symptoms associated with anxiety disorders, ADHD, and schizophrenia.

A 2025 review reported that theanine research has lacked rigor, was mainly based on anecdotes, had ill-defined mechanisms, and exhibited unreliable clinical trials.

== See also ==
- Caffeine
- γ-Glutamylmethylamide
- Green tea
