= Glycine dehydrogenase =

glycine dehydrogenase

Identifiers
- EC no.: 1.4.1.10
- CAS no.: 37255-40-6

Databases
- IntEnz: IntEnz view
- BRENDA: BRENDA entry
- ExPASy: NiceZyme view
- KEGG: KEGG entry
- MetaCyc: metabolic pathway
- PRIAM: profile
- PDB structures: RCSB PDB PDBe PDBsum
- Gene Ontology: AmiGO / QuickGO
Search
- PMC: articles
- PubMed: articles
- NCBI: proteins

In enzymology, glycine dehydrogenase (EC 1.4.1.10) is an enzyme that catalyzes the chemical reaction

glycine
+ NAD^{+}
H_{2}O
H^{+}
H_{2}O
H^{+}
glyoxylic acid
+ NADH + NH_{3}

The three substrates of this enzyme are glycine, water, and oxidised nicotinamide adenine dinucleotide (NAD^{+}). Its products are glyoxylic acid, reduced NADH, ammonia, and a proton.

This enzyme belongs to the family of oxidoreductases, specifically those acting on the CH-NH_{2} group of donors with NAD+ or NADP+ as acceptor. The systematic name of this enzyme class is glycine:NAD+ oxidoreductase (deaminating).

This should not be confused with:

the glycine dehydrogenase (decarboxylating), which is another name for the glycine cleavage system P-protein (EC 1.4.4.2).

or the glycine dehydroganse (cyanide forming) (EC 1.4.99.5).

or the glycine dehydrogenase (cytochrome) (EC 1.4.2.1).
