= Γ-Glutamylmethylamide =

Chemical compound

γ-Glutamylmethylamide
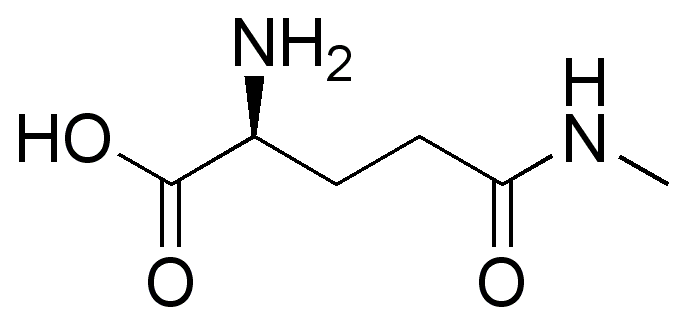
- gamma-Glutamylmethylamide

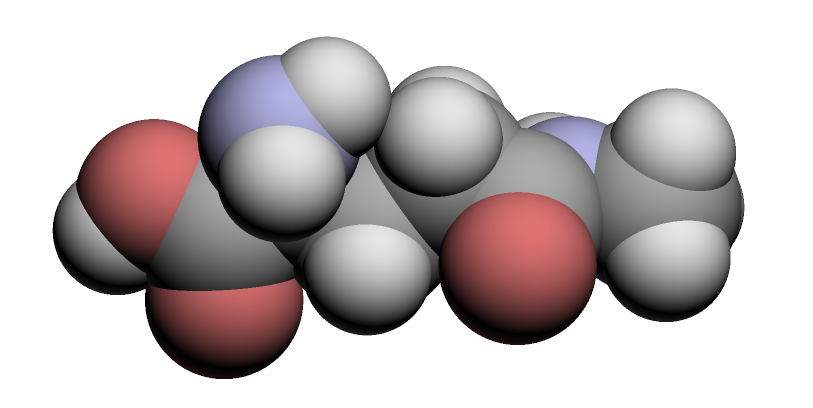
- gamma-Glutamylmethylamide

Names
- IUPAC name N-Methyl-L-glutamine
- Systematic IUPAC name (2S)-2-Amino-5-(methylamino)-5-oxopentanoic acid
- Other names Metheanine

Identifiers
CAS Number	3081-62-7
3D model (JSmol)	Interactive image
ChEBI	CHEBI:58200
ChemSpider	388957
DrugBank	DB03473
KEGG	C03153
PubChem CID	439925
UNII	2N7NDF57QD
CompTox Dashboard (EPA)	DTXSID70953014
- InChI: InChI=1S/C6H12N2O3/c1-8-5(9)3-2-4(7)6(10)11/h4H,2-3,7H2,1H3,(H,8,9)(H,10,11)/t4-/m0/s1 Key: ONXPDKGXOOORHB-BYPYZUCNSA-N; InChI=1/C6H12N2O3/c1-8-5(9)3-2-4(7)6(10)11/h4H,2-3,7H2,1H3,(H,8,9)(H,10,11)/t4-/m0/s1 Key: ONXPDKGXOOORHB-BYPYZUCNBU
- SMILES: O=C(NC)CC[C@H](N)C(=O)O

Properties
Chemical formula	C_{6}H_{12}N_{2}O_{3}
Molar mass	160.17 g/mol
Density	1.211 g/mL
Boiling point	427.5 °C (801.5 °F; 700.6 K)
- Except where otherwise noted, data are given for materials in their standard state (at 25 °C [77 °F], 100 kPa). verify (what is ?) Infobox references

γ-Glutamylmethylamide (gamma-glutamylmethylamide, GMA, N-methyl-L-glutamine, metheanine) is an amino acid analog of the proteinogenic amino acids L-glutamic acid and L-glutamine, found primarily in plant and fungal species; simply speaking, it is L-glutamine methylated on the amide nitrogen. It is an identified important biosynthetic intermediate allowing bacteria (e.g., methanotrophs) use of methylated amines as carbon and nitrogen source for growth (and so of significant biotechnological interest).

== See also ==
- Theanine
- Health effects of tea
