= Diabetes in dogs =

Treatable disease in dogs

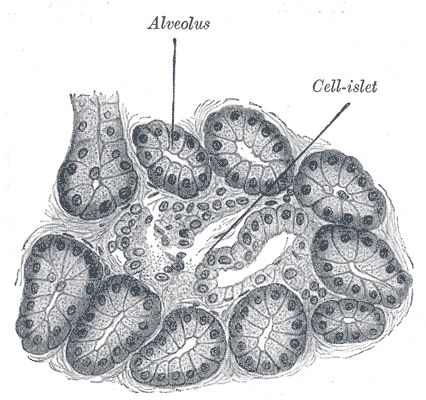
Illustration of a dog's pancreas. Cell-islet in the illustration refers to a pancreatic cell in the Islets of Langerhans, which contain insulin-producing beta cells and other endocrine related cells. Permanent damage to these beta cells results in Type 1, or insulin-dependent diabetes, for which exogenous insulin replacement therapy is the only answer.

Diabetes mellitus is a disease in which the beta cells of the endocrine pancreas either stop producing insulin or can no longer produce it in enough quantity for the body's needs. It is the most common disorder of the endocrine pancreas.

The condition is treatable and need not shorten the animal's life span or interfere with the quality of life. If left untreated, the condition can lead to cataracts, increasing weakness in the legs (neuropathy), malnutrition, ketoacidosis, dehydration, and death. Diabetes mainly affects middle-aged and older dogs, but there are juvenile cases. The typical canine diabetes patient is middle-aged, female, and overweight at diagnosis.

The number of dogs diagnosed with diabetes mellitus has tripled in thirty years. In survival rates from around the same time, only 50% survived the first 60 days after diagnosis and went on to be successfully treated at home. Currently, diabetic dogs receiving treatment have the same expected lifespan as non-diabetic dogs of the same age and gender.

- Type 1 diabetes, sometimes called "juvenile diabetes", is caused by destruction of the beta cells of the pancreas. The condition is also referred to as insulin-dependent diabetes, meaning exogenous insulin injections must replace the insulin the pancreas is no longer capable of producing for the body's needs. Type 1 is the most common form of diabetes in dogs and affects approximately 0.34% of dogs.

Gestational diabetes can develop in dogs as well. It can be prevented by behavioral and dietary management. Diabetes insipidus, which has nothing to do with blood sugar, but is a condition of insufficient antidiuretic hormone or resistance to it, also exists in dogs.

== Classification and causes ==
At present, there is no international standard classification of diabetes in dogs. Commonly used terms are:

- Insulin deficiency diabetes or primary diabetes, which refers to the destruction of the beta cells of the pancreas and their inability to produce insulin.
- Insulin resistance diabetes or secondary diabetes, which describes the resistance to insulin caused by other medical conditions or by hormonal drugs.

While the occurrence of beta cell destruction is known, all of the processes behind it are not. Canine primary diabetes mirrors type 1 human diabetes in the inability to produce insulin and the need for exogenous replacement of it, but the target of canine diabetes autoantibodies has yet to be identified. Breed and treatment studies have been able to provide some evidence of a genetic connection. Studies have furnished evidence that canine diabetes has a seasonal connection not unlike its human Type 1 diabetes counterpart, and a "lifestyle" factor, with pancreatitis being a clear cause. This evidence suggests that the disease in dogs has some environmental and dietary factors involved. Canine obesity causes the corresponding diabetes in dogs also known as canine diabetes (Hoeing 2014).

Secondary diabetes may be caused by use of steroid medications, the hormones of estrus, acromegaly, (spaying can resolve the diabetes), pregnancy, or other medical conditions such as Cushing's disease. In such cases, it may be possible to treat the primary medical problem and revert the animal to non-diabetic status. Returning to non-diabetic status depends on the amount of damage the pancreatic insulin-producing beta cells have sustained.

It is possible for acute pancreatitis to cause a temporary, or transient diabetes, most likely due to damage to the endocrine portion's beta cells. Insulin resistance that can follow a pancreatitis attack may last for some time thereafter. Pancreatitis can damage the endocrine pancreas to the point where the diabetes is permanent.

=== Genetic susceptibility of certain breeds ===
This list of risk factors for canine diabetes is taken from the genetic breed study that was published in 2007. Their "neutral risk" category should be interpreted as insufficient evidence that the dog breed genetically shows a high, moderate, or a low risk for the disease. All risk information is based only on discovered genetic factors.

High risk

- Cairn Terrier
- Samoyed

Moderate risk

- Bichon Frisé
- Border Collie
- Border Terrier
- Collie
- Dachshund
- English Setter
- Poodle
- Schnauzer
- Yorkshire Terrier

Neutral risk

- Cavalier King Charles Spaniel
- Cocker Spaniel
- Doberman
- Jack Russell Terrier
- Labrador Retriever
- Mixed Breed
- Rottweiler
- West Highland Terrier

Low risk

- Boxer
- English Springer Spaniel
- German Shepherd
- Golden Retriever
- Staffordshire Bull Terrier
- Weimaraner
- Welsh Springer Spaniel

=== Gene therapy ===
In February 2013 scientists successfully cured type 1 diabetes in dogs using a pioneering gene therapy.

== Pathogenesis ==
The body uses glucose for energy. Without insulin, glucose is unable to enter the cells where it will be used for this and other anabolic ("building up") purposes, such as the synthesis of glycogen, proteins, and fatty acids. Insulin is also an active preventor of the breakdown or catabolism of glycogen and fat. The absence of sufficient insulin causes this breaking-down process to be accelerated; it is the mechanism behind metabolizing fat instead of glucose and the appearance of ketones.

Since the glucose that normally enters the cells is unable to do so without insulin, it begins to build up in the blood where it can be seen as hyperglycemia or high blood glucose levels. The tubules of the kidneys are normally able to re-absorb glucose, but they are unable to handle and process the amount of glucose they are being presented with. At this point, which is called the renal threshold, the excess glucose spills into the urine (glycosuria), where it can be seen in urine glucose testing. It is the polyuria, or over-frequent urination, which causes polydipsia, or excessive water consumption, through an osmotic process. Even though there is an overabundance of glucose, the lack of insulin does not allow it to enter the cells. As a result, they are not able to receive nourishment from their normal glucose source. The body begins using fat for this purpose, causing weight loss; the process is similar to that of starvation.

== Symptoms ==
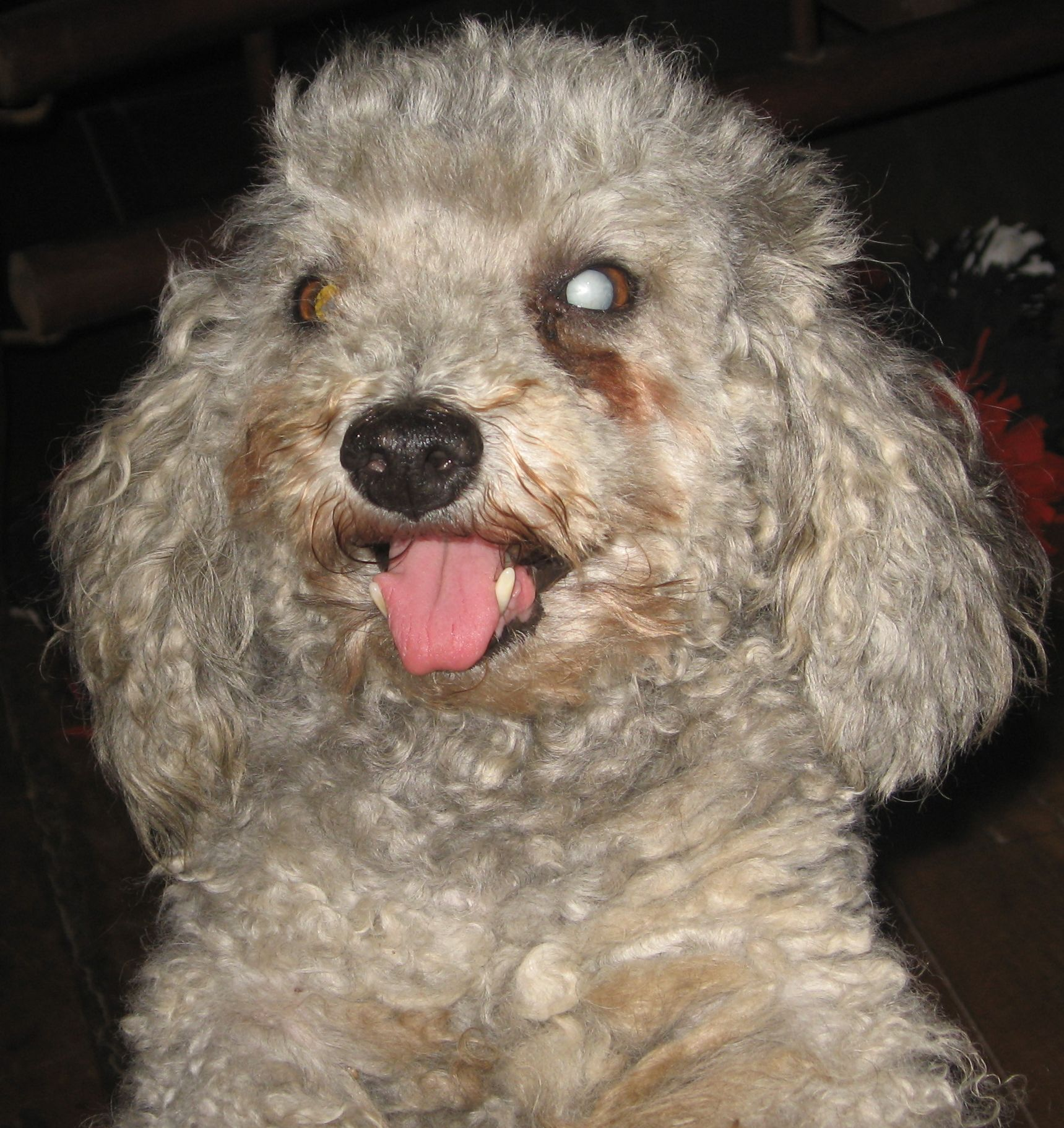
Dog with a cataract in its left eye.

The main symptoms which occur in nearly all dogs with diabetes mellitus are:

- excessive water consumption; this condition is often called polydipsia.
- frequent and/or excessive urination, known as polyuria, often requiring the dog to be let outside to urinate during the night,
- abnormal increase in appetite, a condition known as polyphagia.,
- weight loss; dogs with diabetes may also suffer from severe weight loss, weakness, anorexia and blindness.

Sometimes, the first sign of diabetes noticed by the owner may be that their dog either has become blind (due to the formation of cataracts in the eyes), or has vomiting, anorexia, lethargy and weakness (due to ketoacidosis).

== Checkups ==
Although the symptoms of diabetes mellitus such as frequent urination, thirstiness, greater appetites and inactiveness are easily visible, frequent checking of the dog for the disease is required. The dog's body weight should be determined and calculated once every two weeks using weight scale. The daily caloric requirement by the dog's body and BCS should also be determined using a scale as part of dietary management in maintaining average body weight. The protein intake by the dog should also be considered and checked twice a month.

Blood pressure of the dog should also be constantly and daily checked in order to predict any future occurrence. The blood sugar level may also be checked using glucometer to check the glucose level in the body of the dog.

== Management ==
Early diagnosis and treatment can reduce the incidence of complications such as cataracts and neuropathy. Since dogs are insulin dependent, oral diabetes drugs, which require a functional endocrine pancreas with beta cells capable of producing insulin, are ineffective. Diabetic dogs require insulin therapy, which must be continued for life.

The goal of treatment is to regulate blood glucose using insulin and some probable diet and daily routine changes. The process may take a few weeks or many months and is similar as in type 1 diabetic humans. The aim is to keep the blood glucose values in an acceptable range. The commonly recommended dosing method is by "starting low and going slow" as indicated for people with diabetes.

During the initial process of regulation and periodically thereafter, the effectiveness of the insulin dose at controlling blood glucose is evaluated. This is done by a series of blood glucose tests called a curve. Blood samples are taken and tested at intervals of one to two hours over a 12- or 24-hour period. The results are generally transferred into graph form for easier interpretation. They are compared against the feeding and insulin injection times for judgment. The curve provides information regarding the action of the insulin in the animal. It is used to determine insulin dose adjustments, determine lowest and highest blood glucose levels, discover insulin duration and, in the case of continued hyperglycemia, whether the cause is insufficient insulin dose or Somogyi rebound, where blood glucose levels initially reach hypoglycemic levels and are brought to hyperglycemic ones by the body's counterregulatory hormones. Curves also provide evidence of insulin resistance which may be caused by medications other than insulin or by disorders other than diabetes which further testing can help identify.

Other diagnostic tests to determine the level of diabetic control are fructosamine and glycated hemoglobin (GHb) blood tests which can be useful especially if stress may be a factor. While anxiety or stress may influence the results of blood or urine glucose tests, both of these tests measure glycated proteins, which are not affected by them. Fructosamine testing provides information about blood glucose control for an approximate 2- to 4-week period, while GHb tests measure a 2- to 4-month period. Each of these tests has its own limitations and drawbacks and neither are intended to be replacements for blood glucose testing and curves, but are to be used to supplement the information gained from them. While HbA1c tests are a common diagnostic for diabetes in humans, only recently has an A1C test become available for cats and dogs. The product is called A1CARE and is available from Baycom Diagnostics.

The diabetic pet is considered regulated when its blood glucose levels remain within an acceptable range on a regular basis. Acceptable levels for dogs are between 5 and 10 mmol/L or 90 to 180 mg/dL. The range is wider for diabetic animals than non-diabetics, because insulin injections cannot replicate the accuracy of a working pancreas.

=== Insulin therapy ===
The general form of this treatment is an intermediate-acting basal insulin with a regimen of food and insulin every 12 hours, with the insulin injection following the meal. The most commonly used intermediate-acting insulins are NPH, also referred to as isophane, or Caninsulin, also known as Vetsulin, a porcine Lente insulin. While the normal diabetes routine is timed feedings with insulin shots following the meals, dogs unwilling to adhere to this pattern can still attain satisfactory regulation. Most dogs do not require basal/bolus insulin injections; treatment protocol regarding consistency in the diet's calories and composition along with the established feeding and injection times is generally a suitable match for the chosen intermediate-acting insulin.

With Lantus and protamine zinc insulin (PZI) being unreliable in dogs, they are rarely used to treat canine diabetes. Bovine insulin has been used as treatment for some dogs, particularly in the UK. Pfizer Animal Health discontinued of all three types of its veterinary Insuvet bovine insulins in late 2010 and suggested patients be transitioned to Caninsulin. The original owner of the insulin brand, Schering-Plough Animal Health, contracted Wockhardt UK to produce them. Wockhardt UK has produced both bovine and porcine insulins for the human pharmaceutical market for some time.

=== Diet ===
Most of the commercially available prescription diabetes foods are high in fiber, complex carbohydrates, and have proven therapeutic results. One primary concern is getting or keeping the animal eating, as use of the prescribed amount of insulin is dependent on eating full meals. When no meal is eaten, there is still a need for a basal dosage of insulin, which supplies the body's needs without taking food into consideration. Eating a partial meal means a reduction in insulin dose. Basal and reduced insulin dose information should be part of initial doctor–client diabetes discussions in case of need.

It is possible to regulate diabetes without any diet change. If the animal will not eat a prescribed diet, it is not in the dog's best interest to insist on it; the amount of additional insulin required because a non-prescription diet is being fed is generally between 2–4%. Semi moist foods should be avoided as they tend to contain a lot of sugars. Since dogs with diabetes are prone to pancreatitis and hyperlipidemia, feeding a low-fat food may help limit or avoid these complications. A non-prescription food with a "fixed formula" would be suitable because of the consistency of its preparation. Fixed formula foods contain precise amounts of their ingredients so batches or lots do not vary much if at all. "Open formula" foods contain the ingredients shown on the label but the amount of them can vary, however they must meet the guaranteed analysis on the package. These changes may have an effect on the control of diabetes. Prescription foods are fixed formulas, while most non-prescription ones are open formula unless the manufacturer states otherwise.

=== Glucometers and urine test strips ===
The use of an inexpensive glucometer and blood glucose testing at home can help avoid dangerous insulin overdoses and can provide a better picture of how well the condition is managed.

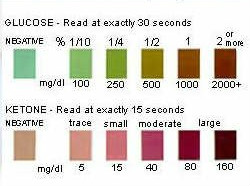
Ketodiastix color chart for interpreting test results. This test measures both ketones and glucose in urine.

A 2003 study of canine diabetes caregivers who were new to testing blood glucose at home found 85% of them were able to both succeed at testing and to continue it on a long-term basis. Using only one blood glucose reading as the reason for an insulin dose increase is to be avoided; while the results may be higher than desired, further information, such as the lowest blood glucose reading or nadir, should be available to prevent possible hypoglycemia.

Urine strips are not recommended to be used as the sole factor for insulin adjustments as they are not accurate enough. Urine glucose testing strips have a negative result until the renal threshold of 10 mmol/L or 180 mg/dL is reached or exceeded for a period of time. The range of negative reading values is quite wide-covering normal or close to normal blood glucose values with no danger of hypoglycemia (euglycemia) to low blood glucose values (hypoglycemia) where treatment would be necessary. Because urine is normally retained in the bladder for a number of hours, the results of urine testing are not an accurate measurement of the levels of glucose in the bloodstream at the time of testing.

Glucometers made for humans are generally accurate using canine and feline blood except when reading lower ranges of blood glucose (<80 mg/dL), (<4.44 mmol/L). It is at this point where the size difference in human vs animal red blood cells can create inaccurate readings. Glucometers for humans were successfully used with pets long before animal-oriented meters were produced. A 2009 study directly compared readings from both types of glucometers to those of a chemistry analyzer. Neither glucometer's readings exactly matched those of the analyzer, but the differences of both were not clinically significant when compared to analyzer results. All glucometer readings need to be compared to same sample laboratory values to determine accuracy.

Continuous glucose monitoring

Some veterinarians are using continuous monitoring as part of the dog's treatment plan (2019). Sensors intended for humans, e.g. Abbot labs Freestyle Libre, can be applied and provide direct measurement of glucose levels eliminating the need for daily urine or blood checks.

== Disease complications ==
=== Ketones – ketoacidosis ===
Ketone monitoring needed:
High blood sugar
over 14 mmol/L or 250 mg/dL
Dehydration
skin does not snap back into place quickly after being gently pinched; gums are tacky or dry
Not eating for over 12 hours
Vomiting	Lethargy
Infection or illness	High stress levels
Breath smells like acetone (nail-polish remover) or fruit.

Ketones in the urine or blood, as detected by urine strips or a blood ketone testing meter, may indicate the beginning of diabetic ketoacidosis (DKA), a dangerous and often quickly fatal condition caused by high glucose levels (hyperglycemia) and low insulin levels combined with certain other systemic stresses. DKA can be arrested if caught quickly.

Ketones are produced by the liver as part of fat metabolism and are normally not found in sufficient quantity to be measured in the urine or blood of non-diabetics or well-controlled diabetics. The body normally uses glucose as its fuel and is able to do so with sufficient insulin levels. When glucose is not available as an energy source because of untreated or poorly treated diabetes and some other unrelated medical conditions, it begins to use fat for energy instead. The result of the body turning to using fat instead of glucose for energy means ketone production that is measurable when testing either urine or blood for them.

Ketone problems that are more serious than the "trace or slight" range need immediate medical attention; they cannot be treated at home. Veterinary care for ketosis/ketoacidosis can involve intravenous (IV) fluids to counter dehydration, when necessary, to replace depleted electrolytes, intravenous or intramuscular short-acting insulin to lower blood glucose levels, and measured amounts of glucose or force feeding, to bring the metabolism back to using glucose instead of fat as its source of energy.

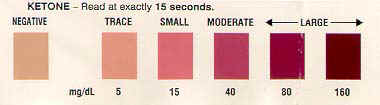
Ketostix color chart for interpreting test results. This test measures only ketones in urine.

When testing urine for ketones, the sample needs to be as fresh as possible. Ketones evaporate quickly, so there is a chance of getting a false negative test result if testing older urine. The urine testing strip bottle has instructions and color charts to illustrate how the color on the strip will change given the level of ketones or glucose in the urine over 15 (ketones–Ketostix) or 30 (glucose–Ketodiastix) seconds. Reading the colors at those time intervals is important because the colors will continue to darken and a later reading will be an incorrect result. Timing with a clock or watch second hand instead of counting is more accurate.

At present, there is only one glucometer available for home use that tests blood for ketones using special strips for that purpose–Abbott's Precision Xtra. This meter is known as Precision, Optium, or Xceed outside of the US. The blood ketone test strips are very expensive; prices start at about US$50 for ten strips. It is most likely urine test strips–either ones that test only for ketones or ones that test for both glucose and ketones in urine would be used. The table above is a guide to when ketones may be present.

=== Nonketotic hyperosmolar syndrome ===
Nonketotic hyperosmolar syndrome (also known as hyperglycemic hyperosmolar syndrome) is a rare but extremely serious complication of untreated canine diabetes, which is a medical emergency. It shares the symptoms of extreme hyperglycemia, dehydration, and lethargy with ketoacidosis; because there is some insulin in the system, the body does not begin to turn to using fat as its energy source and there is no ketone production. There is not sufficient insulin available to the body for proper uptake of glucose, but there is enough to prevent ketone formation. The problem of dehydration in NHS is more profound than in diabetic ketoacidosis. Seizures and coma are possible. Treatment is similar to that of ketoacidosis, with the exceptions being that NHS requires that the blood glucose levels and rehydration be normalized at a slower rate than for DKA; cerebral edema is possible if the treatment progresses too rapidly.

==== Dehydration ====
Clinical Signs of Dehydration
Based on percentage of body weight, not percentage of fluid loss
< 5% (mild)	not detectable
5–6% (moderate)	slight loss of skin elasticity
6–8% (moderate)
definite loss of skin elasticity	slight prolongation of capillary refill
slight sinking of eyes into orbit	slight dryness of oral mucous membranes
10–12% (marked)–emergency
tented skin stands in place
prolonged capillary refill	eyes sunken in orbits
dry mucous membranes	possible signs of shock
12–15% signs of hypovolemic shock, death–emergency

Body fluid loss is measured in two major ways–sensible and insensible. Sensible is defined as being able to be measured in some way; vomiting, urination and defecation are all considered to be sensible losses as they have the ability to be measured. An insensible loss example is breathing because while there are some fluid losses, it is not possible to measure the amount of them. With a condition like fever, it is possible to measure the amount of fluid losses from it with a formula that increases by 7% for each degree of above normal body temperature, so it would be classed as a sensible loss.

A check of the pet's gums and skin can indicate dehydration; gums become tacky and dry and skin does not snap back quickly when pinched if dehydration is present. When the skin at the back is lifted, a dehydrated animal's does not fall back into place quickly. Serious dehydration (loss of 10–12% of body fluids) means the pulled up skin stays there and does not go back into place. At this point, the animal may go into shock; dehydration of 12% or more is an immediate medical emergency. Hypovolemic shock is a life-threatening medical condition in which the heart is unable to pump sufficient blood to the body, due to loss of fluids.

Dehydration can change the way subcutaneous insulin is absorbed, so either hyperglycemia or hypoglycemia are possible; dehydration can also cause false negative or positive urine ketone test results. Hyperglycemia means more of a risk for dehydration.

== Treatment complications ==
=== Hypoglycemia ===
Hypoglycemia, or low blood glucose, can happen even with care, since insulin requirements can change without warning. Some common reasons for hypoglycemia include increased or unplanned exercise, illness, or medication interactions, where another medication potentiates the effects of the insulin. Vomiting and diarrhea episodes can bring on a hypoglycemia reaction, due to dehydration or simply a case of too much insulin and not enough properly digested food. Symptoms of hypoglycemia need to be taken seriously and addressed promptly. Since serious hypoglycemia can be fatal, it is better to treat a suspected incident than to fail to respond quickly to the signs of actual hypoglycemia. Dr. Audrey Cook addressed the issue in her 2007 article on diabetes mellitus: "Hypoglycemia is deadly; hyperglycemia is not. Owners must clearly understand that too much insulin can kill, and that they should call a veterinarian or halve the dose if they have any concerns about a pet's well-being or appetite. Tell owners to offer food immediately if the pet is weak or is behaving strangely."

==== Clinical signs ====
Some common symptoms are:

- depression or lethargy
- confusion or dizziness
- trembling
- weakness
- ataxia (loss of coordination or balance)
- loss of excretory or bladder control (sudden house accident)
- vomiting, and then loss of consciousness and possible seizures

Successful home treatment of a hypoglycemia event depends on being able to recognize the symptoms early and responding quickly with treatment. Trying to make a seizing or unconscious animal swallow can cause choking on the food or liquid. There is also a chance that the materials could be aspirated (enter the lungs instead of being swallowed). Seizures or loss of consciousness because of low blood glucose levels are medical emergencies.

==== Treatment ====
Food should be offered at the first signs of possible hypoglycemia. If the animal refuses it, a sugar solution (corn syrup, honey, pancake syrup, etc.) should be poured on the finger and rubbed on its gums or under the tongue (sublingually). The solution must be applied this way to prevent possible aspiration of it. Intervet suggests one tablespoon of a sugar solution rubbed onto the gums, regardless of the size of the dog. Another hypoglycemia formula is 1 gram of glucose for every kilogram (2.2 lb) of the animal's body weight. Since sugar acts quickly, a response should be seen within a minute or two.

Honey, syrup, or sugar, as simple carbohydrates, act rapidly and will make the blood glucose rise, but the rise will not last very long, as they are broken down quickly by the body. Feeding something containing complex carbohydrates when the pet is able to eat will make sure another hypoglycemia event does not overtake the rapid rise in blood glucose levels from the sugar solution. Complex carbohydrates take longer to be broken down by the body, so they do not raise blood glucose levels until some time after being eaten. A small meal should be fed and the animal taken for medical evaluation to determine if further treatment is needed. Treatment of a serious hypoglycemia episode is similar to that of diabetic humans: using glucose or glucagon infusions, depending on severity. Apart from the medicinal way, lifestyle management of the dog can also be considered when preventing a diabetes attack on the dog. Physical exercising activities such as homeopathy, walking and swimming of the dog are suggested under behavioral management in treating diabetes because it results in tissue preservation. Dietary management in food service is also essential in preventing diabetes attack. A dietary management may include low fat content foods, complex carbohydrates that aid in slowing down glucose absorption, protein and fiber.

== Epidemiology ==
The prevalence of diabetes mellitus in the dog ranges between 0.32% and 1.33%. (Note: An insurance cohort in Sweden estimated 1.2% of dogs to develop diabetes mellitus before age 12. A UK insurance cohort showed 0.32% of dogs to have diabetes mellitus. An American study reviewing hospital records found a prevalence of 0.64%. An Italian study reviewing hospital records foumd 1.33% prevalence.)
