= Angélica Mendoza de Ascarza =

Peruvian Quechua human rights activist

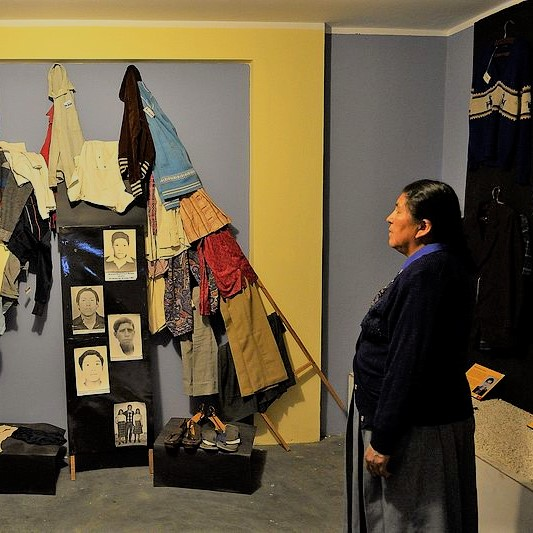
- Born: Angélica Remigia Mendoza de Ascarza; 1 October 1929; Ayacucho
- Died: 28 August 2017 (aged 87); Ayacucho
- Occupation: Human rights activist
- Years active: 1983–2017
- Known for: Foundation of and work for the ANFASEP
- Spouse: Estanislao Alcarza Barrón
- Awards: People's Defender Medal

Angélica Mendoza de Ascarza (1 October 1929 – 28 August 2017) was a Peruvian Quechua human rights activist. She is considered a symbol of human rights in Peru and of those who disappeared in the country from 1980 to 2000 as a result of internal violence in Peru and has been recognized by the International Red Cross and Amnesty International as a "tireless advocate for those women who lost their loved ones."

== Biography ==
Angélica Mendoza de Ascarza was born a Quechua in the central Andean valley of Peru on 1 August 1929. On 7 June 1964, their son Arquímedes was born.

=== Kidnapping and execution of Arquímedes Mendoza ===
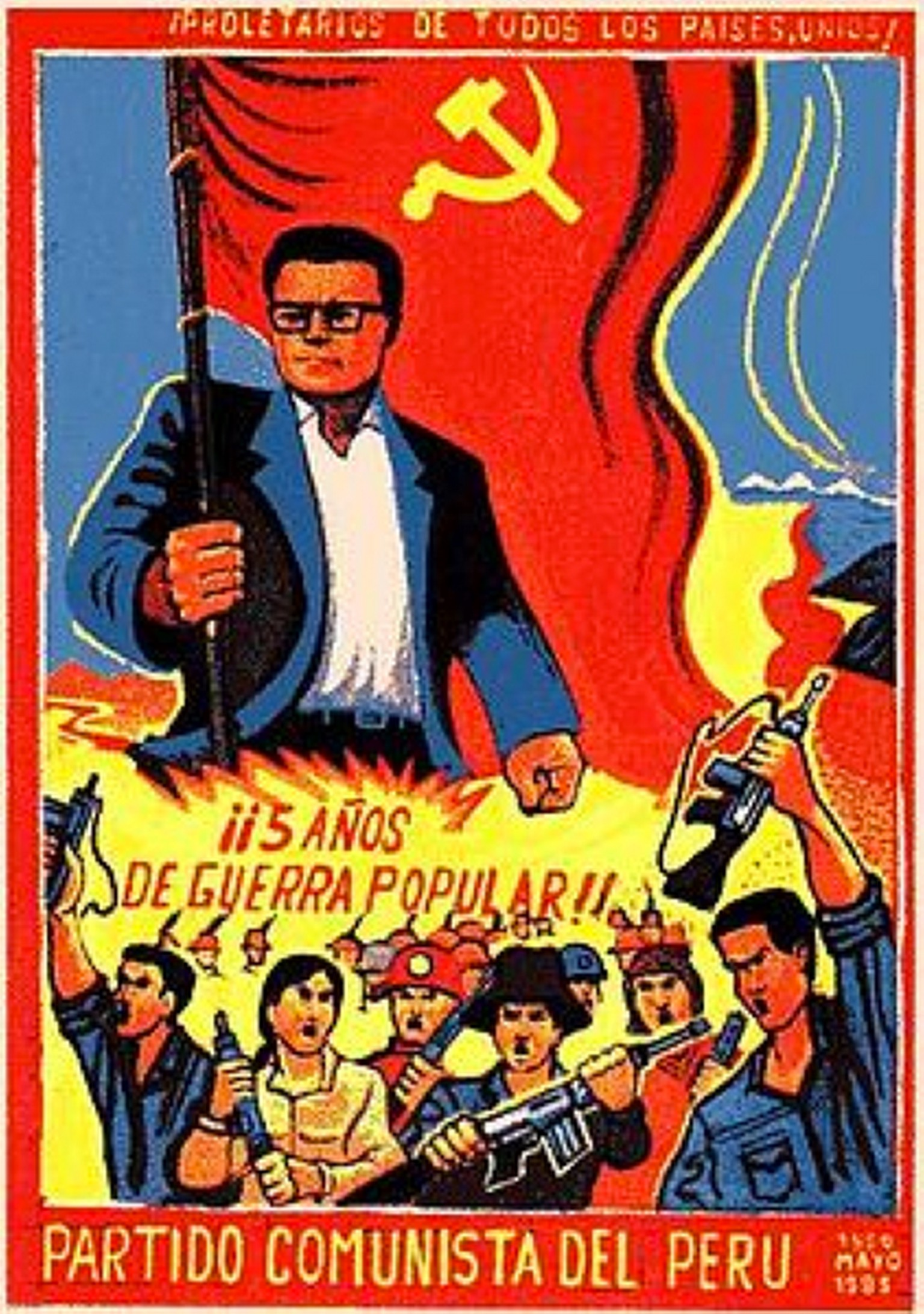
Communist propaganda poster portraying Abimael Guzmán, holding the red flag, leads the Communist Party of Peru.

On 17 May 1980, a militant group called the Shining Path, the Communist Party of Peru, (Note: This article will refer to the Communist Party of Peru as "Shining Path.") began its guerrilla war against the Peruvian government by burning ballot boxes in Chuschi, Ayacucho. The most intense, extensive and bloody conflict in the history of Peru began shortly in the highlands of Ayacucho. In 1982, the Peruvian Army assumed the government of Ayacucho and from 1983 to 1985 began brutal reprisals against the people of Ayacucho for guerrilla killings.

On 12 July 1983 at 00:00 hours, Mendoza's 19-year-old son Arquímedes was taken into the custody of the Peruvian military and State Police on suspicion of being a communist sympathizer. Soldiers and police stormed the 54 year old Mendoza's residence and threatened Mendoza's family with death and destruction of property. Mendoza sustained physical attack as she attempted to prevent the abduction of her son. In subsequent statements to the Truth and Reconciliation Commission (CVR), Estanislao described the men who stormed the Mendoza residence and seized their son:

... there were some who were dressed in military uniform, green, chevrons on the shoulder and wearing balaclavas. Others wore green trousers, black sweaters and balaclavas. They all wore black boots and had machine guns, revolvers, sticks in their belts. Some carried weapons on their shoulders and others pointed to them ...

Loaded into a truck with other detainees, Arquímedes was taken to the Los Cabitos Barracks in Ayacucho where the military tortured and executed detained persons. According to later testimony to the CVR at a public hearing in Ayacucho, one of the soldiers that kidnapped Arquímedes told Mendoza that she could visit the Los Cabitos Barracks the next day to retrieve her son and that they were merely taking statements from their detainees as "witnesses." When she did visit the barracks the next day, Mendoza was told by soldiers that the prisoners had been moved out of the barracks to an undisclosed location. Desperate, Mendoza took to the streets to look for her son in Ayacucho as well as many neighboring towns and villages like Huanta and Huamanga without aid from the military, local government, or local churches. The only contact Mendoza would ever again have with her son was a note asking Mendoza to find a lawyer to attempt to get Arquímedes out of imprisonment. His remains were never discovered.

=== Foundation of the ANFASEP ===
With the emergence of the guerrilla Túpac Amaru Revolutionary Movement in 1982, the conflict morphed into a hybrid civil war. Increasingly pressured, the Peruvian government began viewing the peasants in the countryside as potential allies of Shining Path, so they endeavored to have as little contact with them as possible. On 2 September 1983, Mendoza and other Quechua-speaking village women formed the National Association of Relatives of the Kidnapped, Detained and Disappeared of Peru (ANFASEP) in Ayacucho with the initial goal of fostering friendly relations with the government so that they and the people could work together to find disappeared persons, called Desaparecidos. Mendoza was elected president and gained the support of the provincial mayor of Huamanga, Leonor Zama, who allowed the ANFASEP to meet in the town. The organization's early days were hard, as Ayacucho was almost constantly under siege and its members were thought to be communists by the military. With the formation of the ANFASEP, she earned the nickname Mamá Angélica and became a symbol of the movement to find the Desaparecidos.

On 3 February 1985, Pope John Paul II visited Ayacucho to implore the communist insurgents to reconcile with the government and donated $50,000 to aid war orphans. Later that year, the ANFASEP successfully mounted its first march from the Plaza of Arms in Ayacucho, of which Nobel Prize laureate Adolfo Pérez Esquivel took part. Marchers carried images of missing persons, wooden crosses, and signs, fashioned for a hoped-for encounter with the Pope.

On 15 September 1992, the government of President Alberto Fujimori accused Mendoza of being a member of Shining Path and an "ambassador of terrorism." Threatened with imprisonment by Fujimori, Mendoza worked in secret for a period of two years before the Ministry of Justice declared the accusation to be vacuous.

=== Testimonies before the CVR ===
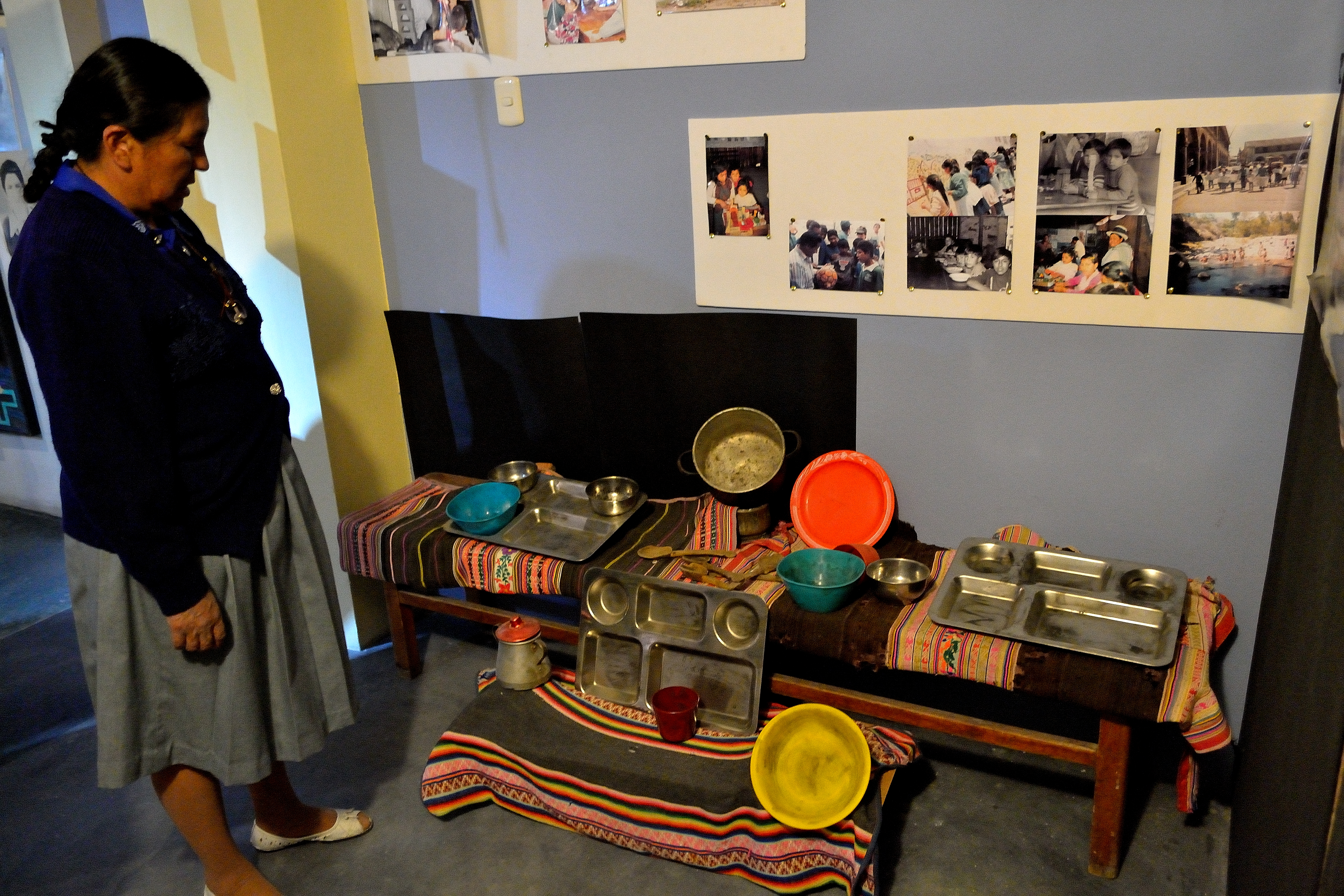
Mendoza standing next to effects belonging to Desaparecidos in the ANFASEP museum.

Mendoza testified about the arrest and disappearance of her son on 12 July 1983 by Peruvian Army during the second government of Fernando Belaúnde Terry in 2002. In August 2017, the Supreme Court of Peru found those former soldiers under Colonels Paz Avendaño, head of the intelligence detachment at Casa Rosada, and Humberto Orbegozo Talavera, head of the Los Cabitos Barracks, responsible for 53 out of 138 forced disappearances to the Los Cabitos Barracks. Avendaño was sentenced to 23 years in prison and Orbegozo was sentenced to 30 years. Both men were ordered by the court to pay the families of their victims $77,000. Mendoza, in attendance at their sentencing, expressed her gratitude.

=== Later work ===
As the Peruvian Civil War calmed, there were still thousands of dead and missing persons that their families still looked for. Provisional President Valentín Paniagua created the Truth and Reconciliation Commission of Peru to meet the demands of the people but ultimately was unable to because of the stalling of his bureaucracy. Mendoza continued to head the ANFASEP, remaining active in it until her death.

In June 2012, Mendoza was awarded the People's Defender award by the Peruvian ombudsman in recognition of promotion and defense of human rights in the Republic of Peru.

== Illness and death ==
In 2016, relatives of Mendoza reported that she was in a very poor state of health as a result of a diabetic ketoacidosis and, as a result of the extreme pain caused by her condition, could not stand and had to remain in bed. In the afternoon of 28 August 2017, two weeks after the hearing that sentenced the perpetrators of the Los Cabitos Barracks to prison, Mendoza, aged 87, died in her home due to complications related to pneumonia. Mendoza's funeral was held in the Cathedral Basilica of St. Mary, Ayacucho, an institution that had previously refused to recognize her or her work.

Upon learning of Mendoza's death, Gloria Cano, the lawyer who represented the victims of the Los Cabitos Barracks staff, wrote on her Facebook page, "You achieved the unity of your relatives with your struggle, you managed to get the truth to be known and to condemn two of those responsible." The Peruvian Ministry of Justice tweeted "Mother Angelica passed away, a symbol of the search for missing persons, and her perseverance began the path towards truth and justice." The Peruvian ombudsman's office tweeted "we regret the death of Mother Angelica, tireless fighter's search for truth and justice for the disappeared in Ayacucho."

== See also ==
- Internal conflict in Peru
