= Alcoholic ketoacidosis =

- Other names: Alcoholic ketosis, alcoholic acidosis
- It generally occurs in chronic alcoholics or those who binge drink
- Specialty: Internal medicine
- Symptoms: Abdominal pain, vomiting, agitation, fast respiratory rate, specific "fruity" smell
- Risk factors: Alcoholism, binge drinking
- Diagnostic method: Based on symptoms
- Differential diagnosis: Other causes of high anion gap metabolic acidosis (diabetic ketoacidosis, toxic alcohol ingestion, starvation ketosis), pancreatitis
- Treatment: Intravenous fluids, thiamine
- Prognosis: Good with treatment

Alcoholic ketoacidosis (AKA) is a specific group of symptoms and metabolic state related to alcohol use. Symptoms often include abdominal pain, vomiting, agitation, a fast respiratory rate, and a specific "fruity" smell. Consciousness is generally normal. Complications may include sudden death.

AKA most commonly occurs in long term alcoholics and less commonly in those who binge drink. Onset is generally after a decreased ability to eat for a few days. Diagnosis is generally based on symptoms. Blood sugar levels are often normal or only mildly increased. Other conditions that may present similarly include other causes of high anion gap metabolic acidosis including diabetic ketoacidosis.

Treatment is generally with intravenous normal saline and intravenous sugar solution. Thiamine and measures to prevent alcohol withdrawal are also recommended. Treatment of low blood potassium may also be required. Those who are affected are most frequently between the ages of 20 and 60. The condition was initially recognized in 1940 and named in 1971.

== Signs and symptoms ==
Nausea, vomiting, and abdominal pain are commonly present and people may also have tachypnea, tachycardia, and hypotension. In contrast to diabetic ketoacidosis, people with alcoholic ketoacidosis are usually alert and lucid despite the severity of the acidosis.

== Causes ==
Alcoholic ketoacidosis is caused by complex physiology that is the result of prolonged and heavy alcohol intake, usually in the setting of poor nutrition. Chronic alcohol use can cause depleted hepatic glycogen stores and ethanol metabolism further impairs gluconeogenesis. This can reduce glucose availability and lead to hypoglycemia and increased reliance on fatty acid and ketone metabolism. An additional stressor such as vomiting or dehydration can cause an increase in counterregulatory hormones such as glucagon, cortisol and growth hormone which may further increase free fatty acid release and ketone production. Ethanol metabolism can also increase blood lactic acid levels (lactic acidosis), due to pseudohypoxia, which may also contribute to a metabolic acidosis.

== Diagnosis ==
Diagnosis is generally based on symptoms. An elevated anion gap metabolic acidosis and ketosis is the classic present. However, a mixed acid-base disorder may be present especially if vomiting is contributing to a hypochloremic alkalosis. The ketone which is present is mostly beta-hydroxybutyrate rather than acetoacetate resulting in only a weakly positive nitroprusside test. People usually do not present with high blood sugar or sugar in the urine. This can cause false negative results when testing urine ketones as they only measure acetoacetate. Ethanol level are often low or negative despite a chronic alcohol use history. Electrolyte disturbances may include hypokalemia or hypomagnesemia may also be present.

=== Differential diagnosis ===
Other conditions that may present similarly include other causes of high anion gap metabolic acidosis such as diabetic ketoacidosis, toxic alcohol ingestion, and starvation ketosis. Toxic alcohol ingestion includes methanol and ethylene glycol poisoning. Pancreatitis, alcoholic hepatitis, and gastritis may also result in similar symptoms. The ratio of beta-hydroxybutryate to acetoacetate is usually higher in AKA (8:1) in contrast to diabetic ketoacidosis (3:1).

== Management ==
Treatment includes administration of intravenous saline to rehydrate and 5% dextrose to turn off gluconeogenesis. Electrolyte imbalances, specifically hypokalaemia, should be corrected. Thiamine supplementation is often included to prevent Wernicke encephalopathy. Insulin is generally not used due to risk of hypoglycemia. Other potential causes of the symptoms should be ruled out.

== Prognosis ==
Outcomes are generally favorable with treatment but up to 10% may develop cardiac arrest. It is proposed that alcoholic ketoacidosis is a significant cause of death among people with chronic alcoholism although the true prevalence is unknown. Estimation of prevalence and outcomes of this population is limited by difficulty in diagnosing the condition and the presence of multiple disorders at presentation.

== History ==
In 1940, Edward S. Dillon, W. Wallace, and Leon S. Smelo, first described alcoholic ketoacidosis as a distinct syndrome. They stated that "because of the many and complex factors, both physiologic and pathologic, which influence the acid-base balance of the body, a multitude of processes may bring about the state of acidosis as an end result".

In 1971, David W. Jenkins and colleagues described cases of three non-diabetic people with a history of chronic heavy alcohol misuse and recurrent episodes of ketoacidosis. This group also proposed a possible underlying mechanism for this metabolic disturbance, naming it alcoholic ketoacidosis.
