= High anion gap metabolic acidosis =

- Other names: anion-gap metabolic acidosis, AGMA
- Specialty: Emergency medicine, critical care, toxicology, nephrology

High anion gap metabolic acidosis is a form of metabolic acidosis characterized by a high anion gap (a medical value based on the concentrations of ions in a patient's serum). Metabolic acidosis occurs when the body produces too much acid, or when the kidneys are not removing enough acid from the body. Several types of metabolic acidosis occur, grouped by their influence on the anion gap.

The anion gap can be increased due to relatively low levels of cations other than sodium and potassium (e.g. calcium or magnesium). An anion gap is usually considered to be high if it is over 12 mEq/L.

High anion gap metabolic acidosis is typically caused by acid produced by the body. More rarely, it may be caused by ingesting methanol or overdosing on aspirin. The delta ratio is a formula that can be used to assess elevated anion gap metabolic acidosis and to evaluate whether mixed acid base disorder (metabolic acidosis) is present. The list of agents that cause high anion gap metabolic acidosis is similar to but broader than the list of agents that cause a serum osmolal gap.

== Causes ==
The most common causes of high anion gap metabolic acidosis are ketoacidosis, lactic acidosis, kidney failure, and toxic ingestions.

Ketoacidosis can occur as a complication of diabetes mellitus (diabetic ketoacidosis) or as a result of other disorders, such as chronic alcoholism and malnutrition. In these conditions, excessive free fatty acid metabolism results in the production of ketoacids, acetoacetic acid, and beta-hydroxybutyrate.

Lactic acidosis results from excess formation and decreased metabolism of lactate, which occurs during states of anaerobic metabolism. It is the most common cause of metabolic acidosis in hospitalized patients. The most serious form occurs during various states of shock, due to episodes of decreased liver perfusion.

Kidney failure results in decreased acid excretion and increased bicarbonate excretion.

Toxins that result in acidic metabolites may trigger lactic acidosis. Rhabdomyolysis, a muscle-wasting disease, is a rare cause of metabolic acidosis.

=== Mnemonics ===
Various mnemonics are used to assist clinicians in the detection and diagnosis of conditions that may result in high anion gap metabolic acidosis:

The newer 2008 mnemonic "GOLD MARK" was proposed in The Lancet reflecting current causes of anion gap metabolic acidosis:

- G — glycols (ethylene glycol & propylene glycol)
- O — oxoproline, a metabolite of paracetamol (acetaminophen)
- L — L-lactate, the chemical responsible for lactic acidosis
- D — D-lactate
- M — methanol
- A — aspirin
- R — renal failure
- K — ketoacidosis, ketones generated from starvation, alcohol, and diabetic ketoacidosis

The mnemonic MUDPILES is commonly used to remember the causes of increased anion gap metabolic acidosis.

- M — Methanol
- U — Uremia (chronic kidney failure)
- D — Diabetic ketoacidosis
- P — Paracetamol, Propylene glycol (used as an inactive stabilizer in many medications; historically, the "P" also stood for Paraldehyde, though this substance is not commonly used today)
- I — Infection, Iron, Isoniazid (which can cause lactic acidosis in overdose), Inborn errors of metabolism (an especially important consideration in pediatric patients)
- L — Lactic acidosis
- E — Ethylene glycol (Note: Ethanol is sometimes included in this mnemonic as well, although the acidosis caused by ethanol is actually primarily due to the increased production of lactic acid found in such intoxication.)
- S — Salicylates

Another frequently used mnemonic is KARMEL.

- K — Ketoacidosis
- A — aspirin
- R — Renal failure
- M — Methanol
- E — Ethylene glycol
- L — Lactic acidosis

Yet another frequently used mnemonic is KULT.

- K — Ketoacidosis (DKA, Alcoholic ketoacidosis)
- U — Uremia
- L — Lactic acidosis
- T — Toxins (Ethylene glycol, methanol, as well as drugs, such as aspirin, Metformin)

The mnemonic for toxins is ACE GIFTs: Aspirin, Cyanide, Ethanolic ketosis, Glycols (ethylene and propylene), Isoniazid, Ferrous iron, Toluene, salicylates. Most of these cause a lactic acidosis.

=== Other ===
- formaldehyde
- toluene
- sulfates
- metformin
- rhabdomyolysis

== See also ==
- Normal anion gap acidosis
- Pseudohypoxia
