= Cathedral Basilica of St. Mary =

Cathedral Basilica of St. Mary may refer to:

- Cathedral Basilica of St. Mary (Trujillo, Peru)
- Cathedral Basilica of St. Mary (Panama City), Panama
- Cathedral Basilica of St. Mary, Oradea, Romania
- Cathedral Basilica of St. Mary, Ayacucho, Peru
