= Hyperosmolar hyperglycemic state =

- Other names: Hyperosmolar hyperglycemic nonketotic coma (HHNC), hyperosmolar non-ketotic coma (HONK), nonketotic hyperosmolar coma, hyperosmolar hyperglycemic nonketotic syndrome (HHNS)
- Video describing diabetes and its complications, including HHS.
- Specialty: Endocrinology, critical care medicine
- Symptoms: Signs of dehydration, altered level of consciousness
- Complications: Disseminated intravascular coagulopathy, mesenteric artery occlusion, rhabdomyolysis
- Usual onset: Days to weeks
- Duration: Few days
- Risk factors: Infections, stroke, trauma, certain medications, heart attacks
- Diagnostic method: Blood tests
- Differential diagnosis: Diabetic ketoacidosis
- Treatment: Intravenous fluids, insulin, low molecular weight heparin, antibiotics
- Prognosis: ~15% risk of death
- Frequency: Relatively common

Hyperosmolar hyperglycemic state (HHS), also known as hyperosmolar non-ketotic state (HONK), is a complication of diabetes mellitus in which high blood sugar results in high osmolarity without significant ketoacidosis. Symptoms include signs of dehydration, weakness, leg cramps, vision problems, and an altered level of consciousness. Onset is typically over days to weeks. Complications may include seizures, disseminated intravascular coagulopathy, mesenteric artery occlusion, or rhabdomyolysis.

The main risk factor is a history of diabetes mellitus type 2. Occasionally it may occur in those without a prior history of diabetes or those with diabetes mellitus type 1. Triggers include infections, stroke, trauma, certain medications, and heart attacks. Diagnosis is based on blood tests finding a blood sugar greater than 30 mmol/L (600 mg/dL), osmolarity greater than 320 mOsm/kg, and a pH above 7.3.

Initial treatment generally consists of intravenous fluids to manage dehydration, intravenous insulin in those with significant ketones, low molecular weight heparin to decrease the risk of blood clotting, and antibiotics among those in whom there are concerns of infection. The goal is a slow decline in blood sugar levels. Potassium replacement is often required as the metabolic problems are corrected. Efforts to prevent diabetic foot ulcers are also important. It typically takes a few days for the person to return to baseline.

While the exact frequency of the condition is unknown, it is relatively common. Older people are most commonly affected. The risk of death among those affected is about 15%. It was first described in the 1880s.

== Signs and symptoms ==
Symptoms of high blood sugar including increased thirst (polydipsia), increased volume of urination (polyuria), and increased hunger (polyphagia).

Symptoms of HHS include:

- Altered level of consciousness
- Neurologic signs including: blurred vision, headaches, focal seizures, myoclonic jerking, reversible paralysis
- Motor abnormalities including flaccidity, depressed reflexes, tremors or fasciculations
- Hyperviscosity and increased risk of blood clot formation
- Dehydration
- Weight loss
- Nausea, vomiting, and abdominal pain
- Weakness
- Low blood pressure with standing

== Cause ==
The main risk factor is a history of diabetes mellitus type 2. Occasionally it may occur in those without a prior history of diabetes or those with diabetes mellitus type 1. Triggers include infections, stroke, trauma, certain medications, and heart attacks.

Other risk factors:

- Lack of sufficient insulin (but enough to prevent ketosis)
- Poor kidney function
- Poor fluid intake (dehydration)
- Older age (50–70 years)
- Certain medical conditions (cerebral vascular injury, myocardial infarction, sepsis)
- Certain medications (glucocorticoids, beta-blockers, thiazide diuretics, calcium channel blockers, and phenytoin)

== Pathophysiology ==
HHS is usually precipitated by an infection, myocardial infarction, stroke or another acute illness. A relative insulin deficiency leads to a serum glucose that is usually higher than 33 mmol/L (600 mg/dL), and a resulting serum osmolarity that is greater than 320 mOsm. This leads to excessive urination (more specifically an osmotic diuresis), which, in turn, leads to volume depletion and hemoconcentration that causes a further increase in blood glucose level. Ketosis is absent because the presence of some insulin inhibits hormone-sensitive lipase-mediated fat tissue breakdown.

== Diagnosis ==
=== Criteria ===
According to the American Diabetes Association, diagnostic features include:

- Plasma glucose level >30 mmol/L (>600 mg/dL)
- Serum osmolality >320 mOsm/kg
- Profound dehydration, up to an average of 9L (and therefore substantial thirst (polydipsia))
- Serum pH >7.30
- Bicarbonate >15 mEq/L
- Small ketonuria (~+ on dipstick) and absent-to-low ketonemia (<3 mmol/L)
- Some alteration in consciousness
- BUN > 30 mg/dL (increased)
- Creatinine > 1.5 mg/dL (increased)

=== Imaging ===
Cranial imaging is not used for diagnosis of this condition. However, if an MRI is performed, it may show cortical restricted diffusion with unusual characteristics of reversible T2 hypointensity in the subcortical white matter.

=== Differential diagnosis ===
The major differential diagnosis is diabetic ketoacidosis (DKA). In contrast to DKA, serum glucose levels in HHS are extremely high, usually greater than 40-50 mmol/L (600 mg/dL). Metabolic acidosis is absent or mild. A temporary state of confusion (delirium) is also more common in HHS than DKA. HHS also tends to affect older people more. DKA may have fruity breath, and rapid and deep breathing.

DKA often has serum glucose level greater than 300 mg/dL (HHS is >600 mg/dL). DKA usually occurs in type 1 diabetics whereas HHS is more common in type 2 diabetics. DKA is characterized by a rapid onset, and HHS occurs gradually over a few days. DKA also is characterized by ketosis due to the breakdown of fat for energy.

Both DKA and HHS may show symptoms of dehydration, increased thirst, increased urination, increased hunger, weight loss, nausea, vomiting, abdominal pain, blurred vision, headaches, weakness, and low blood pressure with standing.

== Management ==
=== Phases and timelines ===
The JBDS HHS care pathway comprises 3 main themes to consider when managing a patient with HHS:

- clinical assessment and monitoring
- interventions
- assessments and prevention of harm

To streamline management, there are 5 phases of therapy from the time of recognition of the condition to resolution:

1. 0–60 min
2. 1–6 hours
3. 6–12 hours
4. 12–24 hours
5. 24–72 hours

=== Intravenous fluids ===
Treatment of HHS begins with reestablishing tissue perfusion using intravenous fluids. People with HHS can be dehydrated by 8 to 12 liters. Attempts to correct this usually take place over 24 hours with initial rates of normal saline often in the range of 1 L/h for the first few hours or until the condition stabilizes.

=== Electrolyte replacement ===
Potassium replacement is often required as the metabolic problems are corrected. It is generally replaced at a rate of 10 mEq per hour as long as there is adequate urinary output.

=== Insulin ===
Insulin is given to reduce blood glucose concentration; however, as it also causes the movement of potassium into cells, serum potassium levels must be sufficiently high or dangerously low blood potassium levels may result. Once potassium levels have been verified to be greater than 3.3 mEq/L, then an insulin infusion of 0.1 units/kg/hr is started. The goal for resolution is a blood glucose of less than 200 mg/dL.
