= Delta ratio =

Formula for identifying acid-base disorders

In nephrology, the delta ratio, or "delta-delta" (denoted Δ/Δ), is a formula that can be used to evaluate whether a mixed acid–base disorder (metabolic acidosis) is present, and if so, assess its severity. The anion gap (AG) without potassium is calculated first and if a metabolic acidosis is present, results in either a high anion gap metabolic acidosis (HAGMA) or a normal anion gap acidosis (NAGMA). A low anion gap is usually an oddity of measurement, rather than a clinical concern.

== Equation ==
The equation for calculating the delta ratio is
$$\begin{align}
\Delta/\Delta &= \frac{\Delta \text{ AG}}{\Delta\ [\ce{HCO3-}]} \\[4pt]
&= \frac{\text{measured AG} - \text{normal AG}}{\text{normal } [\ce{HCO3-}] - \text{measured } [\ce{HCO3-}]} \\[4pt]
&= \frac{[\ce{AG}] - 12}{24 - [\ce{HCO3-}]}
\end{align}$$

where AG is the anion gap, AG = [Na^{+}] - ([Cl^{−}] + [HCO^{−}_{3}]), which reflects either an increase in the anion gap or a decrease in the bicarbonate concentration ([HCO^{−}_{3}]).

== Results ==
The ratio gives one of four results:

1. <0.4 due to a pure NAGMA
2. 0.4–0.8 due to a mixed NAGMA + HAGMA
3. 0.8–2.0 due to a pure HAGMA
4. >2.0 due to a mixed HAGMA + metabolic alkalosis

Results 2 and 4 are the ones which have mixed acid–base disorders.

Results 1. and 4. are oddities, mathematically speaking:

Result 1: if there is a normal anion gap acidosis, the (AG – 12) part of the equation will be close to zero, the delta ratio will be close to zero and there is no mixed acid–base disorder. Your calculations can stop here. A normal anion gap acidosis (NAGMA) has more to do with a change in [Cl^{−}] or [HCO^{−}_{3}] concentrations. So the AG doesn't change; but to maintain electrical equilibrium, if [Cl^{−}] goes up, [HCO^{−}_{3}] must come down. Hence, hyperchloremia always causes a metabolic acidosis as [HCO^{−}_{3}] must fall; alternatively, if the [HCO^{−}_{3}] rises, the [Cl^{−}] must fall. For a list of the common causes of this change in bicarbonate or chloride, see normal anion gap acidosis.

Results 2–4 all involve HAGMAs. A high anion gap metabolic acidosis usually occurs because of an increase in anions. So in the equation: $\text{AG} = [\ce{Na+}] - \Bigl([\ce{Cl-}] + [\ce{HCO3-}] + [\ce{A-}] \Bigr)$ it is the [A^{−}] that is the cause. For a list of the common anions responsible, see high anion gap metabolic acidosis. KULT is probably the easiest of the mnemonics to use (Ketones, Uremia, Lactate, Toxins). Toxins are an uncommon cause of high anion gap metabolic acidosis – a list of the commonest toxins is ACE GIFTs [ibid]. Metformin as a pure toxicological cause is vanishingly rare.

Result 4: if the result of the ratio is greater than 2 in a high anion gap metabolic acidosis, it is usually because there was a pre-existing higher than normal bicarbonate level. This is commonly found in people with chronic respiratory acidosis from chronic lung disease such as chronic obstructive pulmonary disease (COPD), who can't breathe off their excess carbon dioxide owing to poor lung function, and retain bicarb in order to counteract the acidosis caused by the retained CO_{2}. Alternatively it could be caused by a concurrent metabolic alkalosis such as vomiting causing acid loss and hence alkalosis, or diuretic use with loss of [Cl^{−}] and a compensatory bicarb retention in order to maintain plasma electrical neutrality.

Mathematically this is reflected in a high anion gap, but because the bicarbonate was high to start, it will appear to fall only a small amount. When this happens the numerator is large, the denominator is small, and the result is a delta ratio which is high (>2). This means a combined high anion gap metabolic acidosis and a pre-existing either respiratory acidosis or metabolic alkalosis (causing the high bicarbonate) – i.e. a mixed acid–base metabolic acidosis.

Result 3: if there is a pure HAGMA, the bicarb would be expected to fall at a similar rate as the anion gap rises, since one molecule of acid combines with one molecule of bicarb buffer. So the equation above should be balanced as the change in the AG away from normal (12) is similar to the change in bicarb away from normal (24). Mathematically, if the change in the numerator is similar to the change in the denominator, the delta ratio will be close to 1. Since the anions are unable to diffuse out of the bloodstream, while bicarbonate and hydrogen ions diffuse with ease (as H_{2}CO_{3}, carbonic acid), the usual result will be closer to a delta ratio of 1 to 2. Lactic acidosis usually causes a ratio of 1.6.

Result 2: if the delta ratio is somewhere between low (<0.4) and high (1–2), then it is usually due to a combination of high anion gap metabolic acidosis and normal anion gap acidosis. For example, a person with cholera may have a normal anion gap acidosis due to diarrhea, but becomes progressively dehydrated and develops a lactic acidosis from shock, and proceeds to develop a high anion gap metabolic acidosis – i.e. a mixed acid–base disorder.
