= C7H15Cl2N2O2P =

The molecular formula C_{7}H_{15}Cl_{2}N_{2}O_{2}P (molar mass: 261.09 g/mol, exact mass: 260.0248 u) may refer to:

- Ifosfamide (IFO)
- Cyclophosphamide (CP)
