= National Association of Relatives of the Kidnapped, Detained and Disappeared of Peru =

- Asociación Nacional de Familiares de Secuestrados, Detenidos y Desaparecidos del Perú
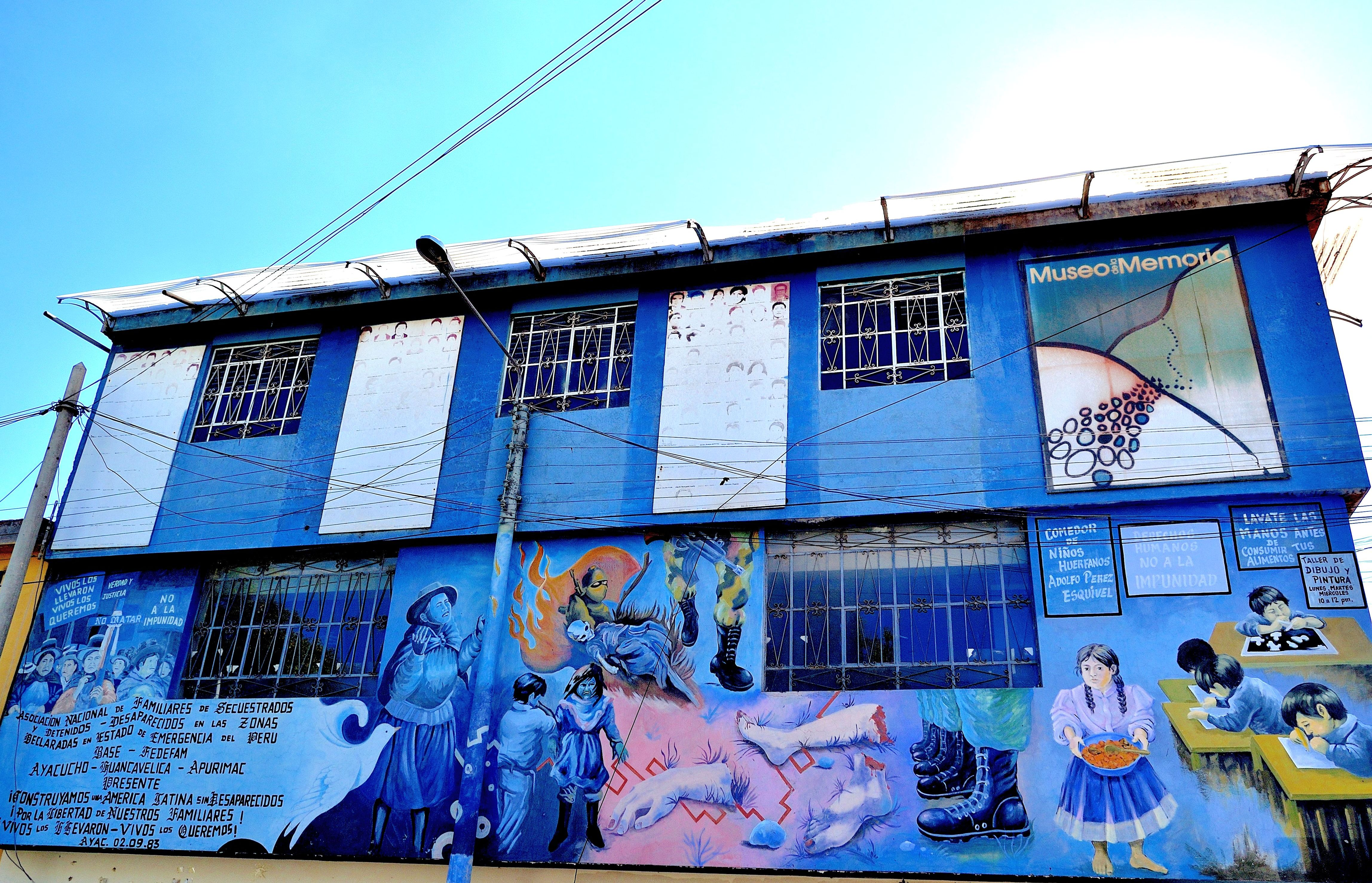
- Website: https://anfasep.org/

The National Association of Relatives of Kidnapped, Detained and Disappeared of Peru (Spanish: Asociación Nacional de Familiares de Secuestrados, Detenidos y Desaparecidos del Perú, ANFASEP) is a Peruvian organization that brings together relatives of people who were disappeared during the internal conflict in Peru.

== Background ==
Based in Ayacucho, ANFASEP was founded in 1983. In that year it had 800 members. ANFASEP was the first victims' organization in Peru. It was led by Angélica Mendoza from its creation until 2006.

In 2005 ANFASEP created a museum dedicated to the conflict (the first in Peru), called Museo de la Memoria.
