= Plaza de Armas (Ayacucho) =

Coordinates: 13.1604°S 74.2258°W

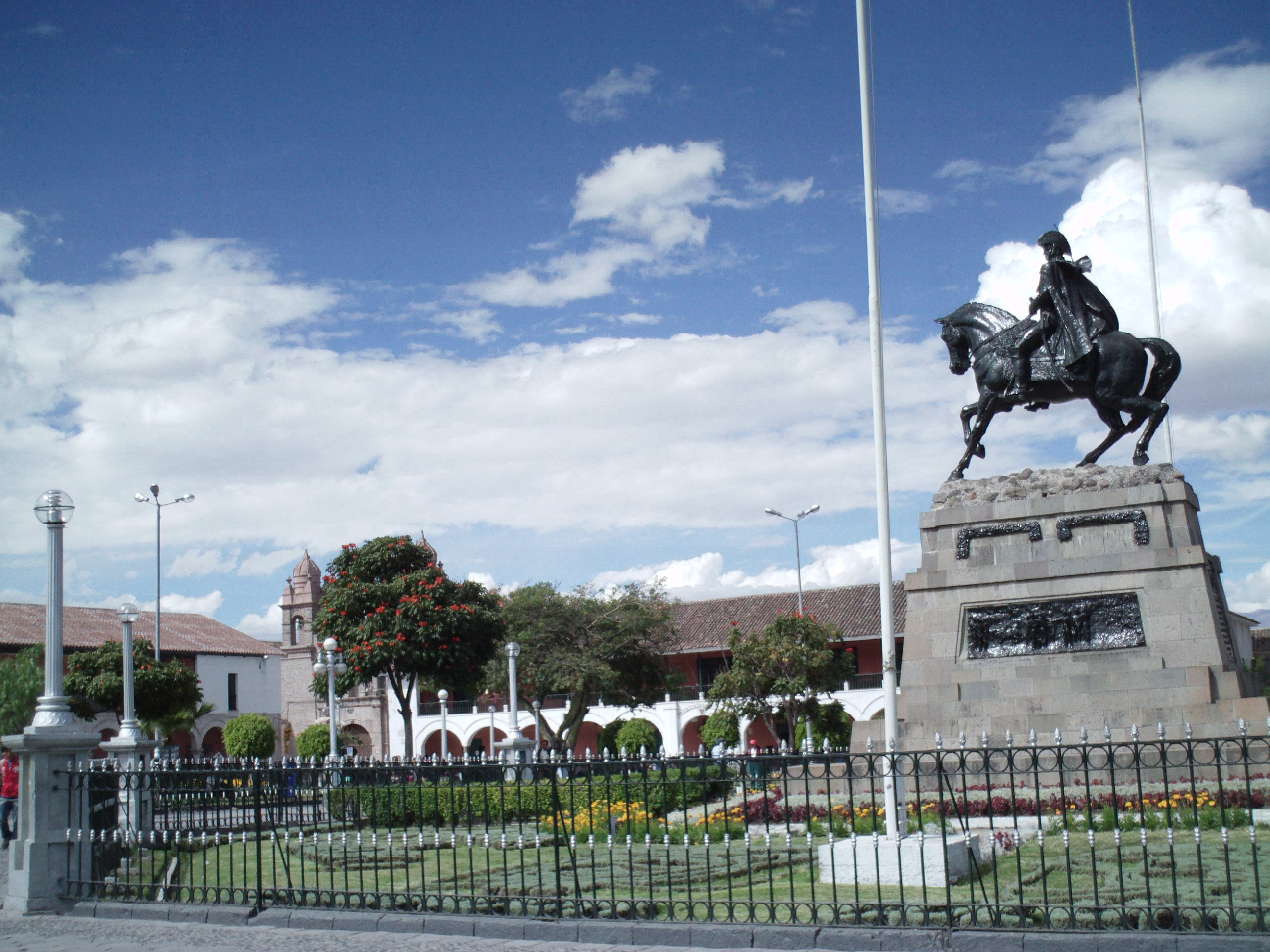
Monument to Mariscal Sucre in the Plaza de Armas of Ayacucho.

The Plaza de Armas of Ayacucho is in the city center of Ayacucho, Peru. Central plazas in Peru are typically called the Plaza Mayor. The Plaza de Armas is so named because it was the place where the city's defenders assembled during emergencies. In Ayacucho it is known as Sucre Park.

== Overview ==
The Plaza de Armas is surrounded by the Cuzco, Portal Constitución, Portal Independencia, and the Portal Municipalidad avenues. It is surrounded by buildings which mostly date from the 16th and 17th centuries. It is Peru's largest square and monuments of great historical and architectural value. It has a level of harmony that unites all its components and it is made in the style of the plazas of Spain, such as the ones in Mérida and Trujillo. The buildings surrounding the square are works of Baroque architecture, with stone arches and red clay roofs. It is the only plaza in Peru with portals of columns and stone arches on all four sides. The east side has 16 arcs or archos (Spanish: arcos). The south side has 32, the west side has 30, and the north has 33. On the perimeter of the square are houses made of white stone, which serve as headquarters for major institutions such as the Municipality, the Cathedral, the Prefecture, the Superior Court, and San Cristóbal of Huamanga University. The monument that stands in the center of the square was erected in honor of the Gran Mariscal de Ayacucho Antonio José de Sucre, which is surrounded by the coats of arms of the Bolivarian countries. In the 1990s, it was remodeled with the addition of two water sources on the east and west sides.

== Churches and convents ==
The city of Ayacucho has 33 Catholic churches, which makes it a religious destination for Christians. Each of those temples (the oldest was built in 1540) has some associated relic, objet d'art, or legend. The Santo Domingo Temple, built in 1548 and the San Francisco de Paula church, built in 1713, show the evolution of style and taste of its builders. The Santo Domingo Temple has Romanesque and Byzantine arcs. The San Francisco de Asís church has Greco-Roman facades with raised images. The Society of Jesus temple has baroque interiors.

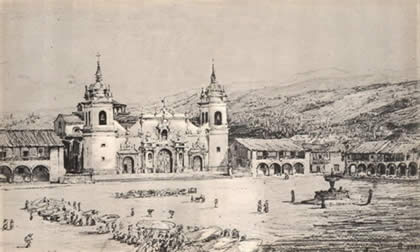
The Plaza de Armas, 1847.

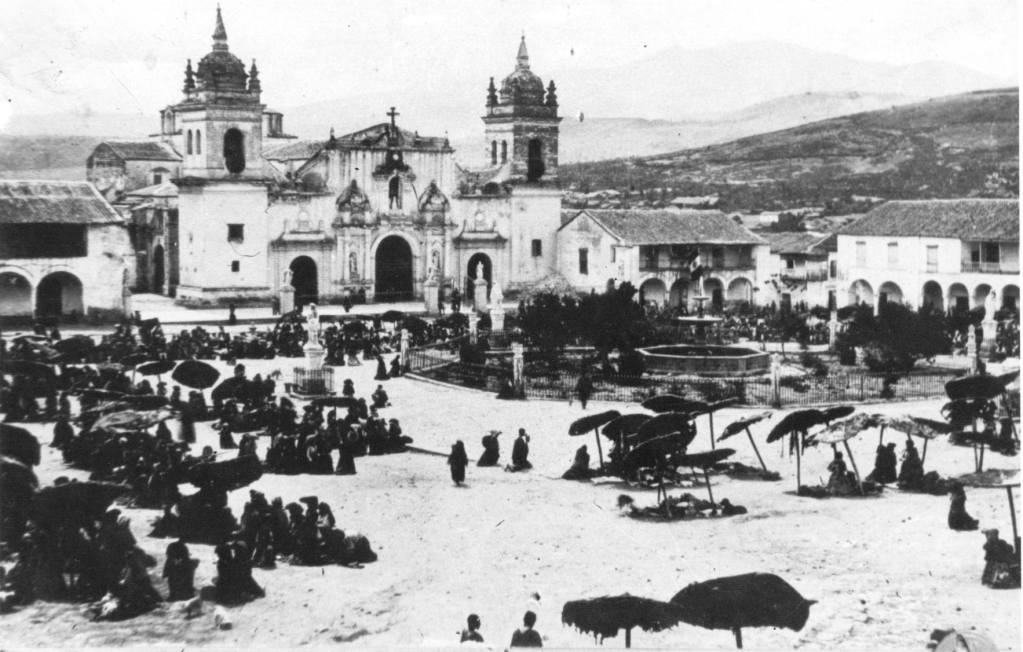
The Angelus on the eve of Easter Sunday 1900 in the Plaza de Armas.

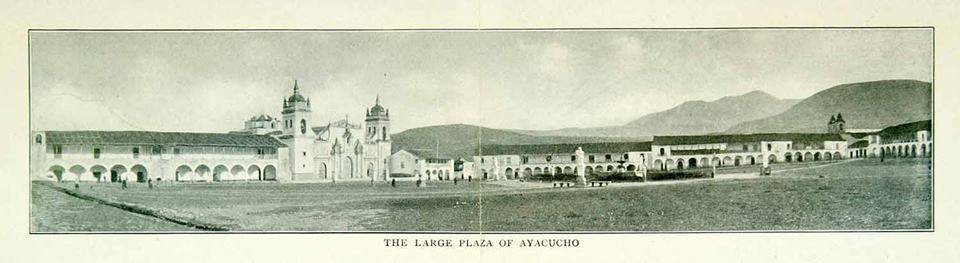
Plaza de Armas, 1911.

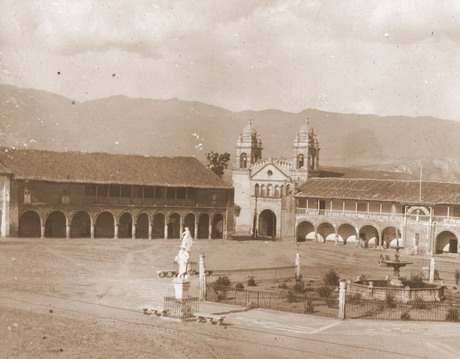
Plaza de Armas, 1920.

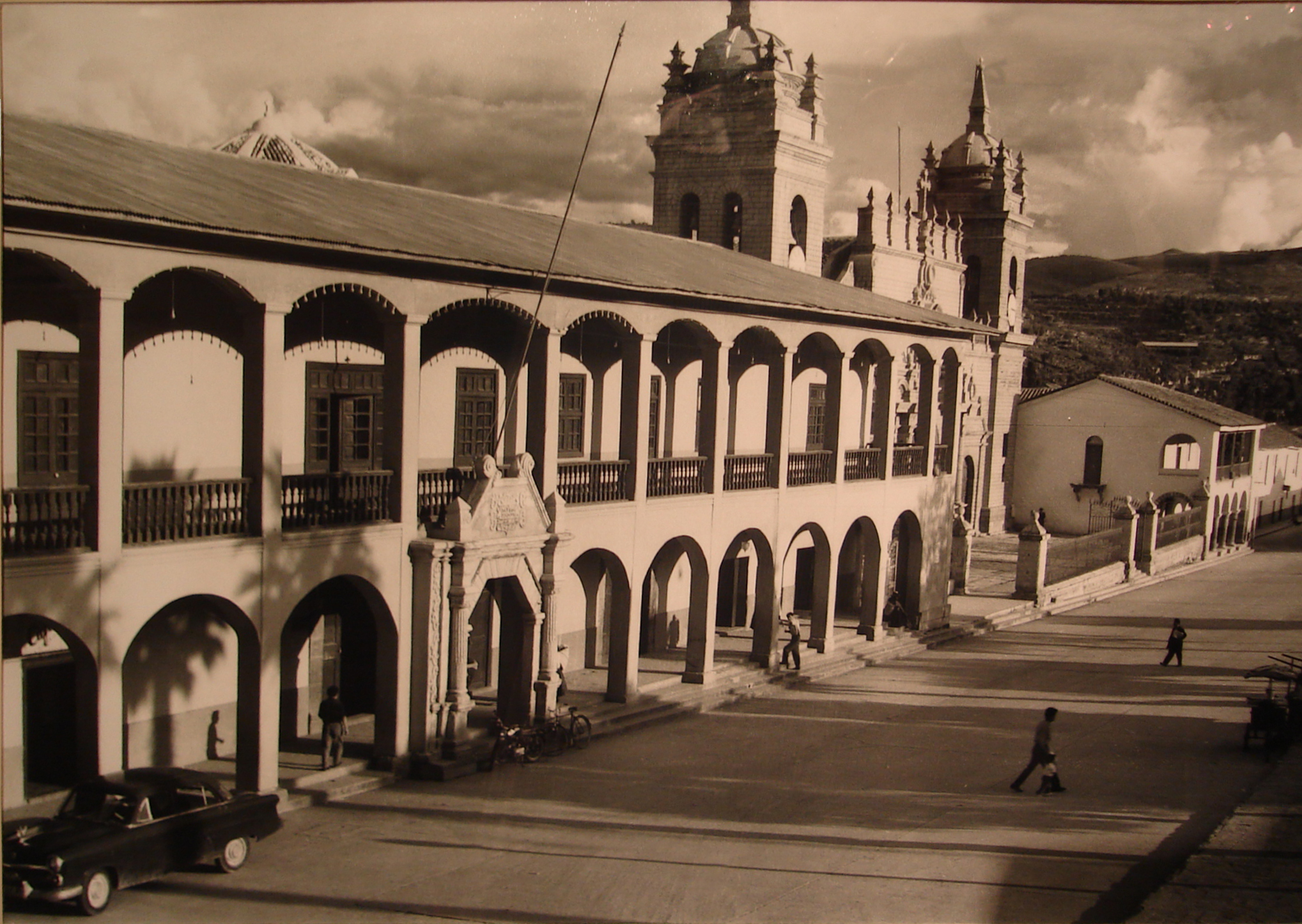
Municipal portal, c. 1945.

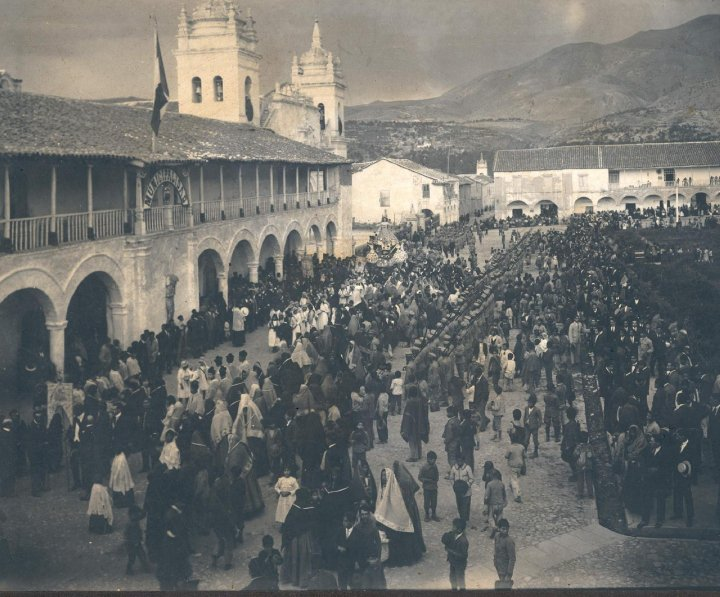
Procession, c. 1960.
