= Kussmaul breathing =

Hyperventilation associated with metabolic acidosis

Graph showing Kussmaul breathing (second from bottom) and other pathological breathing patterns

Kussmaul breathing is a deep and labored breathing pattern often associated with severe metabolic acidosis, particularly diabetic ketoacidosis (DKA) but also kidney failure. It is a form of hyperventilation, which is any breathing pattern that reduces carbon dioxide in the blood due to increased rate or depth of respiration.

In metabolic acidosis, breathing is first rapid and shallow but as acidosis worsens, breathing gradually becomes deep, labored and gasping. It is this latter type of breathing pattern that is referred to as Kussmaul breathing.

== Terminology ==
Adolf Kussmaul referred to breathing when metabolic acidosis was sufficiently severe for the respiratory rate to be normal or reduced. This definition is also followed by several other sources, including for instance Merriam-Webster, which defines Kussmaul breathing as "abnormally slow deep respiration characteristic of air hunger and occurring especially in acidotic states". Other sources, however, use the term Kussmaul respiration also when acidosis is less severe, in which case breathing is rapid.

Kussmaul breathing occurs only in advanced stages of acidosis, and is not commonly seen. Rapid, shallow breathing may be observed in less severe cases but Kussmaul breathing is a characteristic deep, gasping - even desperate - manner of respiratory distress.

== History ==
Kussmaul breathing is named for Adolf Kussmaul, the 19th century German physician who first noted it among patients with advanced diabetes mellitus.

== Mechanism ==
Kussmaul breathing is respiratory compensation for a metabolic acidosis, most commonly occurring in diabetics in diabetic ketoacidosis. Blood gases of a patient with Kussmaul breathing will show a low partial pressure of CO_{2} in conjunction with low bicarbonate because of a forced increased respiration (blowing off the carbon dioxide). Base excess is severely negative. The patient feels an urge to breathe deeply, an "air hunger", and it appears almost involuntary.

A metabolic acidosis soon produces hyperventilation, but at first it will tend to be rapid and relatively shallow. Kussmaul breathing develops as the acidosis grows more severe. Indeed, Kussmaul originally identified this type of breathing as a sign of coma and imminent death in diabetic patients.

Duration of fasting, presence or absence of liver enlargement and Kussmaul breathing provide clues to the differential diagnosis of high blood sugar in the inborn errors of metabolism.
