= Normal anion gap acidosis =

- Other names: Non-anion gap acidosis
- Specialty: Endocrinology, nephrology

Normal anion gap acidosis is an acidosis that is not accompanied by an abnormally increased anion gap.

The most common cause of normal anion gap acidosis is diarrhea with a renal tubular acidosis being a distant second.

== Differential diagnosis ==
The differential diagnosis of normal anion gap acidosis is relatively short (when compared to the differential diagnosis of acidosis):

- Hyperalimentation (e.g. from TPN containing ammonium chloride)
- Chloride administration, often from normal saline
- Acetazolamide and other carbonic anhydrase inhibitors
- Renal tubular acidosis
- Diarrhea: due to a loss of bicarbonate. This is compensated by an increase in chloride concentration, thus leading to a normal anion gap, or hyperchloremic, metabolic acidosis. The pathophysiology of increased chloride concentration is the following: fluid secreted into the gut lumen contains higher amounts of Na^{+} than Cl^{−}; large losses of these fluids, particularly if volume is replaced with fluids containing equal amounts of Na^{+} and Cl^{−}, results in a decrease in the plasma Na^{+} concentration relative to the Cl^{−}concentration. This scenario can be avoided if formulations such as lactated Ringer’s solution are used instead of normal saline to replace GI losses.
- Ureteroenteric fistula – an abnormal connection (fistula) between a ureter and the gastrointestinal tract
- Pancreaticoduodenal fistula – an abnormal connection between the pancreas and duodenum
- Spironolactone
- High ostomy output
- Hyperparathyroidism – can cause hyperchloremia and increase renal bicarbonate loss, which may result in a normal anion gap metabolic acidosis. Patients with hyperparathyroidism may have a lower than normal pH, slightly decreased PaCO2 due to respiratory compensation, a decreased bicarbonate level, and a normal anion gap.

As opposed to high anion gap acidosis (which involves increased organic acid production), normal anion gap acidosis involves either increased production/administration of chloride (hyperchloremic acidosis) or increased excretion of bicarbonate.

== See also ==
- High anion gap metabolic acidosis
