= Cathedral Basilica of St. Mary, Ayacucho =

Cathedral in Ayacucho, Peru

Cathedral of Ayacucho
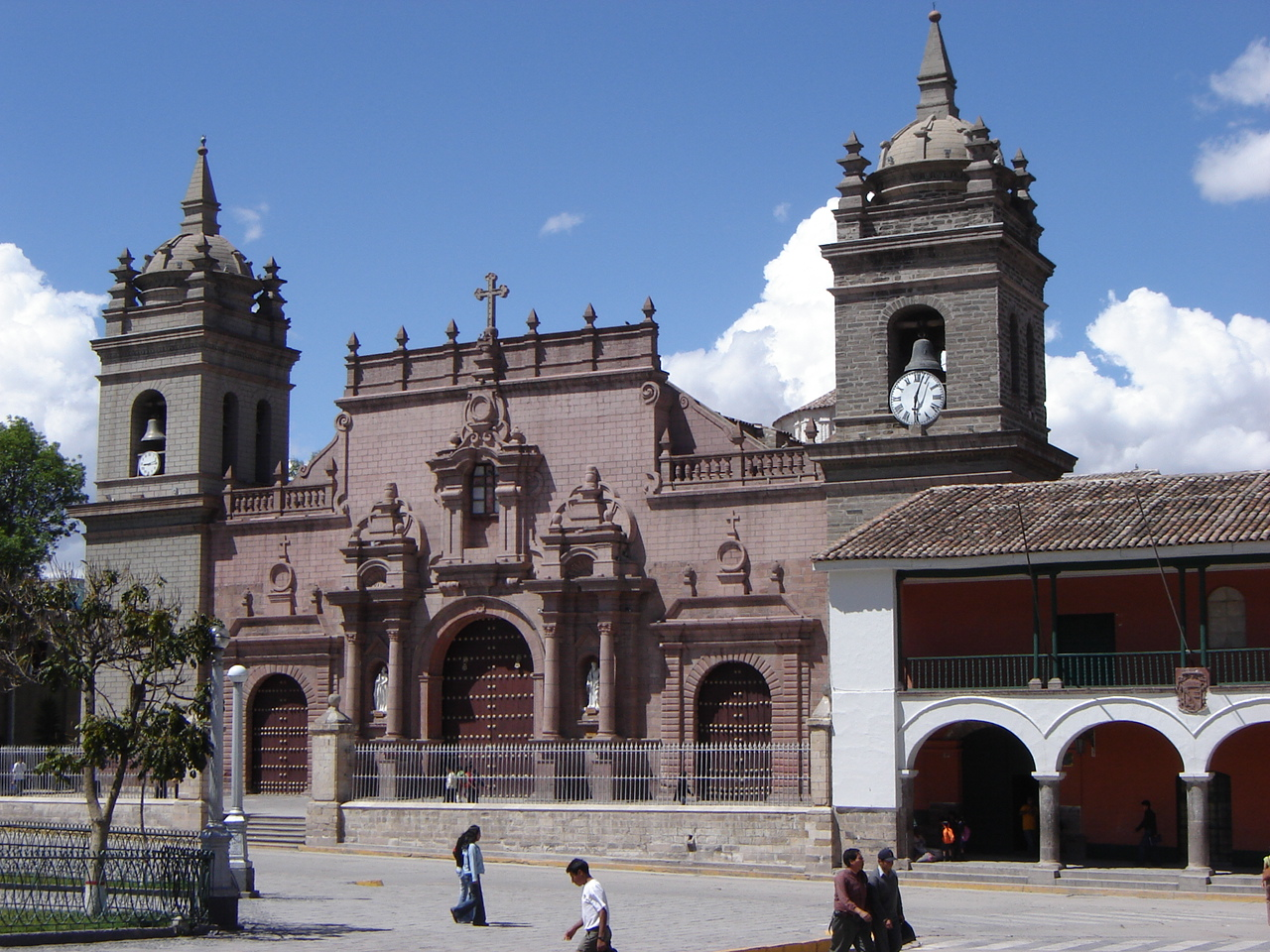
- Cathedral of Ayacucho

Religion
- Affiliation: Roman Catholic
- Ecclesiastical or organizational status: Basilica
- Leadership: Archbishop of Ayacucho

Location
- Location: Ayacucho District, Ayacucho, Peru
- Interactive map of Cathedral of Ayacucho
- Coordinates: 13°09′38″S 74°13′29″W

Architecture
- Style: Baroque
- Groundbreaking: 1632
- Completed: 1672

The Huamanga Cathedral (also known as the Cathedral of Ayacucho) is the main Baroque cathedral in Ayacucho, Peru. It is under the ownership of the Catholic Church and was declared a Historic Cultural Heritage of the Nation of Peru in 1972. It is located in the Plaza de Armas. It is built with pink stone in the center and gray stone in the towers. Its construction began in 1632 and ended in 1672. It is considered one of the most beautiful cathedrals in Peru, especially for its interiors decorated with a Churrigueresque style. It is the main and largest temple in Ayacucho.

== Architecture ==
It has four doors of arches (three in the main facade and one on the north side of the temple.) The central portal of the main facade is flanked by double Corinthian columns resting on pilasters that finish four areas. In the intervals of these columns there are two niches occupied by statues of the apostles St. Peter and St. Paul. The body of the temple has two posterior towers; the south side is made out of stone, while the north side is made out of brick and lime. They have arches, only one in the major sides and two arches on the lateral sides. From what proceeds, it follows that the architectural style of the renaissance baroque facade. It has three naves and chapiters built in hewn stone bearing 16 high vaults and a beautiful domed octagonal triangular base. From this temple, the procession of the Risen Christ beings at dawn on Easter Sunday; concluding Holy Week.

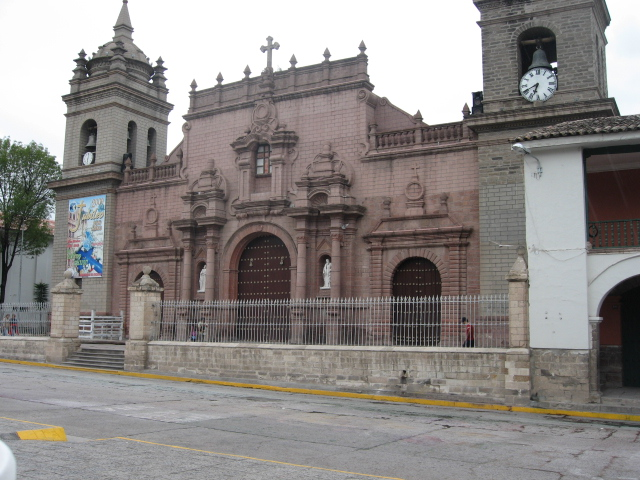
Exterior view of the cathedral during Holy Week.

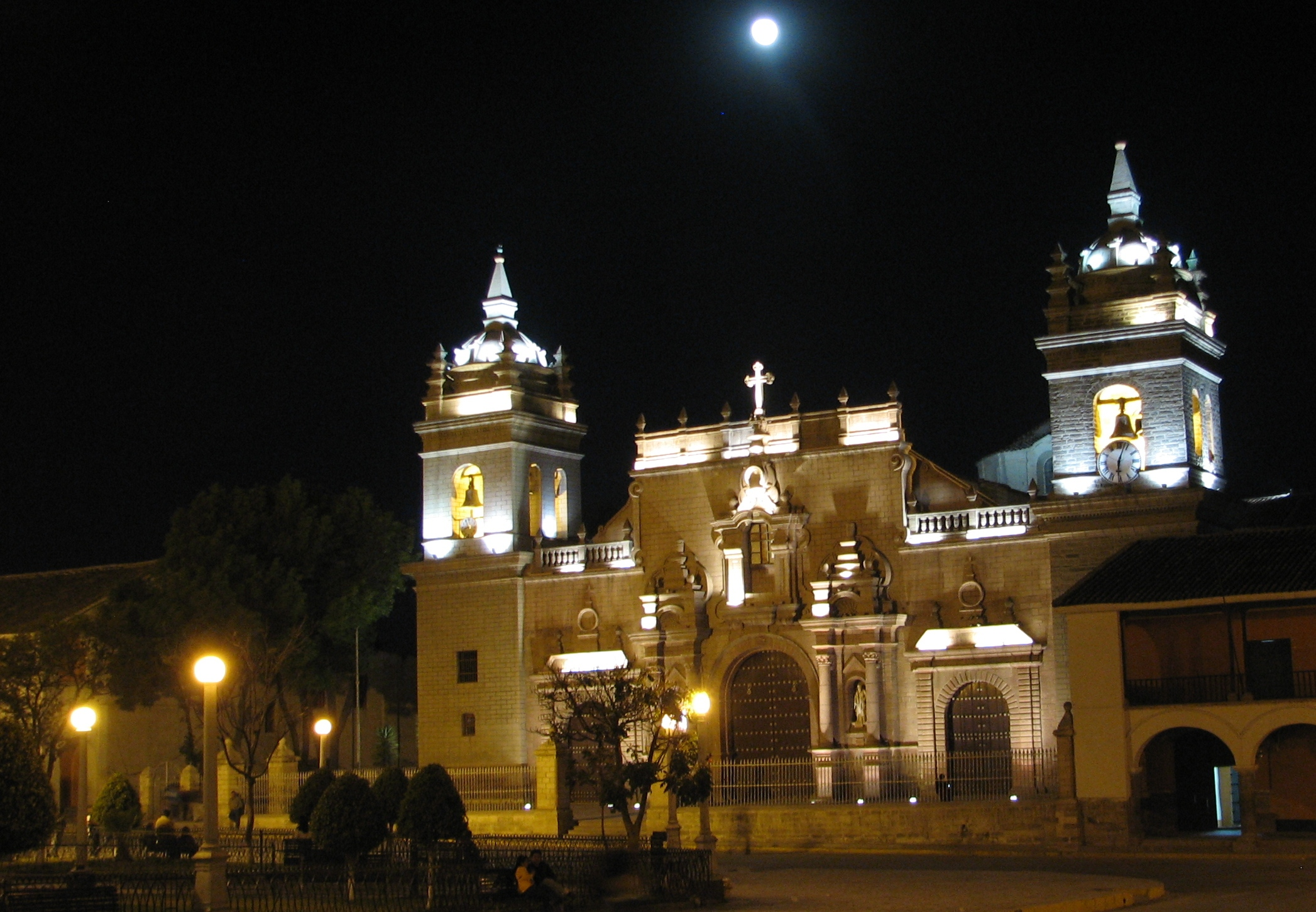
The cathedral at night.

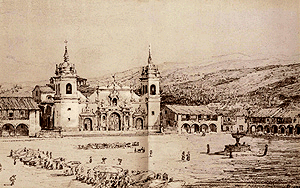
The cathedral according to an engraving of 1847.
