= Counterregulatory hormone =

A counterregulatory hormone is a hormone that opposes the action of another.

== Glucose Counterregulation ==
The action of insulin is counterregulated by glucagon, epinephrine (adrenaline), norepinephrine (noradrenaline), cortisol, and growth hormone. These counterregulatory hormones—the term is usually used in the plural—raise the level of glucose in the blood by promoting glycogenolysis, gluconeogenesis, ketogenesis, and other catabolic processes. In healthy people, counterregulatory hormones constitute a principal defense against hypoglycemia, and levels are expected to rise as the glucose falls.

As an example, the exercise-induced reduction in blood glucose is counterregulated by increases in levels of epinephrine, norepinephrine, cortisol, and growth hormone. The rise in blood concentrations of these counterregulatory hormones is dependent upon both exercise intensity and duration, and is proportional to the rate of glucose uptake by the contracting skeletal muscle.

== Blood Pressure Counterregulation ==
Similarly, the natriuretic peptides counterregulate against renin, angiotensin, and aldosterone which elevate blood pressure.

== Reproductive Counterregulation ==
In the reproductive system, inhibins and follistatin counterregulate activins, to control follicle-stimulating hormone and so the release of gonads. Inhibins and activins also regulate bone mass.
