= HMG-CoA synthase, cytoplasmic =

Enzyme found in humans

HMGCS1

Identifiers
- Aliases: HMGCS1, HMGCS, 3-hydroxy-3-methylglutaryl-CoA synthase 1
- External IDs: OMIM: 142940; MGI: 107592; GeneCards: HMGCS1
Available structures
PDB	Ortholog search: PDBe RCSB
PDB	List of PDB id codes 2P8U
Enzyme activity
EC #	BRENDA	ExPASy	KEGG	MetaCyc
2.3.3.10	↗	↗	↗	↗

Gene location (Human)
Chr.	Chromosome 5 (human)
Band	5p12	Start	43,287,470 bp
Band	5p12	End	43,313,512 bp

Gene location (Mouse)
Chr.	Chromosome 13 (mouse)
Band	13 D2.3|13	Start	120,151,915 bp
Band	13 D2.3|13	End	120,169,796 bp
RNA expression pattern
Bgee	Human / Mouse (ortholog); Top expressed in: ventricular zone; ganglionic eminence; mucosa of esophagus; vulva; skin of abdomen; skin of thigh; islet of Langerhans; amniotic fluid; prefrontal cortex; vagina / Top expressed in: barrel cortex; cumulus cell; superior cervical ganglion; anterior horn of spinal cord; substantia nigra; skin of external ear; fossa; motor neuron; ureter; ciliary body; More reference expression data
BioGPS	n/a
Gene ontology
Molecular function	transferase activity; isomerase activity; catalytic activity; organic acid binding; hydroxymethylglutaryl-CoA synthase activity; protein homodimerization activity
Cellular component	cytosol; cytoplasm
Biological process	steroid metabolic process; male gonad development; response to cholesterol; sterol biosynthetic process; response to organic cyclic compound; cellular response to follicle-stimulating hormone stimulus; lipid metabolism; response to tellurium ion; cellular response to organic cyclic compound; cholesterol metabolic process; response to organic substance; isoprenoid biosynthetic process; cellular response to cholesterol; response to gonadotropin; response to vitamin E; response to purine-containing compound; brain development; response to hormone; liver development; cholesterol biosynthetic process; metabolism; response to low light intensity stimulus; steroid biosynthetic process; regulation of lipid metabolic process; regulation of cholesterol biosynthetic process; cellular response to low-density lipoprotein particle stimulus; acetyl-CoA metabolic process; farnesyl diphosphate biosynthetic process, mevalonate pathway
Sources:Amigo / QuickGO
Orthologs
Databases	NCBI: entry; OMA: entry
Species	Human	Mouse
Entrez	3157	208715
Ensembl	ENSG00000112972	ENSMUSG00000093930
UniProt	Q01581	Q8JZK9
RefSeq (mRNA)	NM_001098272; NM_002130; NM_001324219; NM_001324220; NM_001324222 NM_001324223; NM_001324224; NM_001330663; NM_001364188	NM_001291439; NM_145942
RefSeq (protein)	NP_001091742; NP_001311148; NP_001311149; NP_001311151; NP_001311152 NP_001311153; NP_001317592; NP_002121; NP_001351117	NP_001278368; NP_666054
Location (UCSC)	Chr 5: 43.29 – 43.31 Mb	Chr 13: 120.15 – 120.17 Mb
PubMed search
- Wikidata
View/Edit Human	View/Edit Mouse

HMG-CoA synthase, cytoplasmic is a protein that in humans is encoded by the HMGCS1 gene. This hydroxymethylglutaryl-CoA synthase enzyme is located in the cytoplasm and is involved in one of the early steps of cholesterol synthesis. This differs from HMG-CoA synthase, mitochondrial (encoded by HMGCS2) which is part of ketogenesis.

== Function ==
This enzyme catalyzes the following chemical reaction:

acetoacetyl-CoA + acetyl-CoA + H_{2}O → HMG-CoA + CoA + H^{+}

Which is the second step in the mevalonate pathway which is required for cholesterol production. In the next step, the produced HMG-CoA gets acted on by the enzyme HMG-CoA reductase which is notably the target of statins.

== Medical significance ==
Pathogenic mutations in HMGCS1 are associated with a type of muscle disorder called congenital myopathy 28 with rigid spine (CMY028).
