= Hydroxymethylglutaryl-CoA synthase =

Class of enzymes

3-hydroxy-3-methylglutaryl-Coenzyme A synthase 1 (soluble)

Identifiers
- Symbol: HMGCS1
- Alt. symbols: HMGCS
- NCBI gene: 3157
- HGNC: 5007
- OMIM: 142940
- RefSeq: NM_002130
- UniProt: Q01581

Other data
- EC number: 2.3.3.10
- Locus: Chr. 5 p14-p13
Search for
- Structures: Swiss-model
- Domains: InterPro

3-hydroxy-3-methylglutaryl-Coenzyme A synthase 2 (mitochondrial)

Identifiers
- Symbol: HMGCS2
- NCBI gene: 3158
- HGNC: 5008
- OMIM: 600234
- RefSeq: NM_005518
- UniProt: P54868

Other data
- Locus: Chr. 1 p13-p12
Search for
- Structures: Swiss-model
- Domains: InterPro

Hydroxymethylglutaryl-coenzyme A synthase N terminal
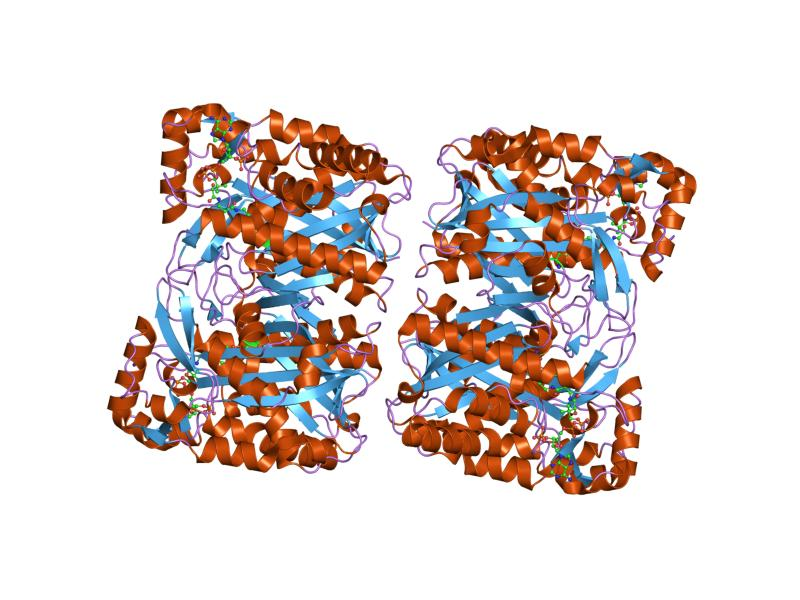
- staphylococcus aureus 3-hydroxy-3-methylglutaryl-coa synthase

Identifiers
- Symbol: HMG_CoA_synt_N
- Pfam: PF01154
- Pfam clan: CL0046
- InterPro: IPR013528
- PROSITE: PDOC00942
Available protein structures:
- PDB: IPR013528 PF01154 (ECOD; PDBsum)
- AlphaFold: IPR013528; PF01154

Hydroxymethylglutaryl-coenzyme A synthase C terminal
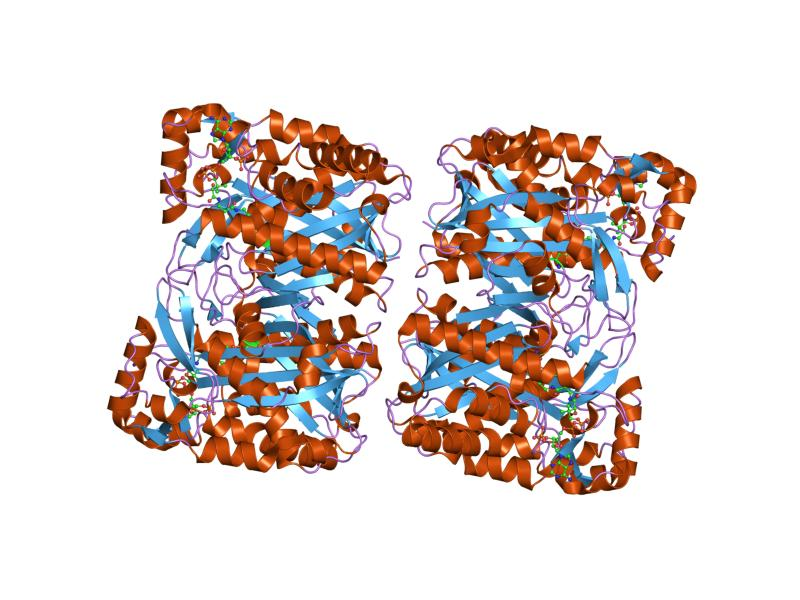
- staphylococcus aureus 3-hydroxy-3-methylglutaryl-coa synthase

Identifiers
- Symbol: HMG_CoA_synt_C
- Pfam: PF08540
- Pfam clan: CL0046
- InterPro: IPR013746
- PROSITE: PDOC00942
Available protein structures:
- PDB: IPR013746 PF08540 (ECOD; PDBsum)
- AlphaFold: IPR013746; PF08540

In biochemistry, hydroxymethylglutaryl-CoA synthase or HMG-CoA synthase EC 2.3.3.10 is an enzyme which catalyzes the reaction in which acetyl-CoA condenses with acetoacetyl-CoA to form 3-hydroxy-3-methylglutaryl-CoA (HMG-CoA). This reaction comprises the second step in the mevalonate-dependent isoprenoid biosynthesis pathway. HMG-CoA is an intermediate in both cholesterol synthesis and ketogenesis. This reaction is overactivated in patients with diabetes mellitus type 1 if left untreated, due to prolonged insulin deficiency and the exhaustion of substrates for gluconeogenesis and the TCA cycle, notably oxaloacetate. This results in shunting of excess acetyl-CoA into the ketone synthesis pathway via HMG-CoA, leading to the development of diabetic ketoacidosis.

HMG-CoA synthase reaction

acetyl-CoA + acetoacetyl-CoA + H_{2}O $\rightleftharpoons$ (S)-3-hydroxy-3-methylglutaryl-CoA + CoA

The 3 substrates of this enzyme are acetyl-CoA, H_{2}O, and acetoacetyl-CoA, whereas its two products are (S)-3-hydroxy-3-methylglutaryl-CoA and CoA.

In humans, two genes encode enzymes of this type, specifically HMGCS1 and HMGCS2.

== Classification ==
This enzyme belongs to the family of transferases, specifically those acyltransferases that convert acyl groups into alkyl groups on transfer.

== Nomenclature ==
The systematic name of this enzyme class is acetyl-CoA:acetoacetyl-CoA C-acetyltransferase (thioester-hydrolysing, carboxymethyl-forming). Other names in common use include (S)-3-hydroxy-3-methylglutaryl-CoA acetoacetyl-CoA-lyase, (CoA-acetylating), 3-hydroxy-3-methylglutaryl CoA synthetase, 3-hydroxy-3-methylglutaryl coenzyme A synthase, 3-hydroxy-3-methylglutaryl coenzyme A synthetase, 3-hydroxy-3-methylglutaryl-CoA synthase, 3-hydroxy-3-methylglutaryl-coenzyme A synthase, beta-hydroxy-beta-methylglutaryl-CoA synthase, HMG-CoA synthase, acetoacetyl coenzyme A transacetase, hydroxymethylglutaryl coenzyme A synthase, and hydroxymethylglutaryl coenzyme A-condensing enzyme.

== Mechanism ==
HMG-CoA synthase contains an important catalytic cysteine residue that acts as a nucleophile in the first step of the reaction: the acetylation of the enzyme by acetyl-CoA (its first substrate) to produce an acetyl-enzyme thioester, releasing the reduced coenzyme A. The subsequent nucleophilic attack on acetoacetyl-CoA (its second substrate) leads to the formation of HMG-CoA.

== Biological role ==
This enzyme participates in 3 metabolic pathways: synthesis and degradation of ketone bodies, valine, leucine and isoleucine degradation, and butanoate metabolism.

== Species distribution ==
HMG-CoA synthase occurs in eukaryotes, archaea, and certain bacteria.

=== Eukaryotes ===
In vertebrates, there are two different isozymes of the enzyme (cytosolic and mitochondrial); in humans the cytosolic form has only 60.6% amino acid identity with the mitochondrial form of the enzyme. HMG-CoA is also found in other eukaryotes such as insects, plants, and fungi.

==== Cytosolic ====
The cytosolic form is the starting point of the mevalonate pathway, which leads to cholesterol and other sterolic and isoprenoid compounds.

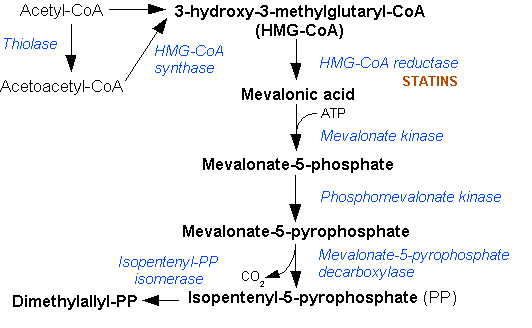
Mevalonate pathway

==== Mitochondrial ====
The mitochondrial form is responsible for the biosynthesis of ketone bodies. The gene for the mitochondrial form of the enzyme has three sterol regulatory elements in the 5' flanking region. These elements are responsible for decreased transcription of the message responsible for enzyme synthesis when dietary cholesterol is high in animals: the same is observed for 3-hydroxy-3-methylglutaryl-CoA and the low density lipoprotein receptor.

Ketogenesis

=== Bacteria ===
In bacteria, isoprenoid precursors are generally synthesised via an alternative, non-mevalonate pathway, however a number of Gram-positive pathogens utilise a mevalonate pathway involving HMG-CoA synthase that is parallel to that found in eukaryotes.

== Structural studies ==
As of late 2007, 4 structures have been solved for this class of enzymes, with PDB accession codes PDB: 1XPK, PDB: 1XPL, PDB: 1XPM, and PDB: 2P8U.
