= Bimal Kumar Bachhawat =

Indian neurochemist and glycobiologist

- Born: 16 August 1925; Kolkata, West Bengal, India
- Died: 23 September 1996 (aged 71); India
- Occupations: Neurochemist; Glycobiologist
- Years active: 1949–1996
- Known for: Glycobiology; Neurochemistry
- Awards: Padma Bhushan; Shanti Swarup Bhatnagar Prize; J. C. Bose Award; R. D. Birla Smarak Kosh Award; Outstanding Teacher Award; INSA S. S. Bhatnagar Medal; IISc Golden Jubilee Award; FICCI Award; Amrut Mody Research Foundation Award

Bimal Kumar Bachhawat (1925–1996; Kolkata, West Bengal) was an Indian neurochemist and glycobiologist, known for his discovery of HMG-CoA lyase, an intermediate in the mevalonate and ketogenesis pathway, and for the elucidation of the molecular cause of metachromatic leukodystrophy, a hereditary disease of the brain His studies on sugar-bearing liposomes led to its use as a carrier for in situ delivery of drugs and hormones to diseased organs and he pioneered the therapy of systemic fungal infections using liposomal formulations. He was a recipient of several awards including the Shanti Swarup Bhatnagar Award, the highest Indian honor in science and technology and an elected fellow of three major Indian science academies. The Government of India awarded him the third highest civilian honour of the Padma Bhushan, in 1990, for his contributions to science.. His son Anand Kumar Bachhawat is a renowned scientist of biochemistry and genetics.

== Biography ==
Dr. Bachhawat has contributed to the knowledge on the metabolism of mucopolysaccharides, gangliosides and cerebrosulphatides, especially in relation to brain function, citation of the Shanti Swarup Bhatnagar Prize.

Bimal Kumar Bachhawat was born on 26 August 1925 as one among five brothers and three sisters in Kolkata, in the Bengal region of British India. His graduate degree in chemistry and master's degree in applied chemistry came from the University of Calcutta after which he pursued his doctoral research in antibiotics at the Department of Food Technology of Jadavpur University under the supervision of A. N. Bose. Moving to US, he continued his research at the University of Illinois at Urbana–Champaign under the guidance of Carl Swensson Vestling and obtained his doctoral degree (PhD) in 1953. Subsequently, he worked with Minor J. Coon, first at University of Pennsylvania and then at the University of Michigan, working on the formation of ketone bodies in mammals.

Bachhawat return to India in 1957 to join Christian Medical College and Hospital (CMC), Vellore and established a centre for advanced research in neurochemistry and glycobiology. Here, he did research on glycolipids, glycosaminoglycans and glycoproteins and their role in neural development and neurological disorders. After working close to two decades at CMC, he moved to his native place, Kolkata, to take up the position as the director of the Indian Institute of Chemical Biology (IICB) in 1976. It was during this time, he was elected as the president of the Federation of Asian and Oceanian Biochemists (FAOB), the first Indian to be elected to the post and held the position from 1983 to 1985. He stayed with IICB till 1985 when he was appointed as the head of the Department of Biochemistry at the University of Delhi and superannuated from service in 1990 as the Dean of the Faculty of Interdisciplinary and Applied Sciences. After retirement from academic career, he served as the president of the Society of Biological Chemists for a second time (he had served the Society as its president in 1970 for a two year-term) and remained as the president till 1994 during which time the society organized the 1994 congress of the International Union of Biochemistry and Molecular Biology (IUBMB). He was associated with the Council of Scientific and Industrial Research (CSIR) as the chairman of its technical advisory board on biological studies and was a council member (1975–77) and vice president (1987–88) of the Indian National Science Academy.

Bachhawat was married to Kamala and the couple had two daughters, Kalpana and Kiran, and a son, Anand Kumar Bachhawat. He died on 23 September 1996, at the age of 71, survived by his wife and children.

== Legacy ==
Bachhawat's principal contributions are spread in three areas; institution building, researches in neurochemistry and glycobiology, and academics. At Christian Medical College, he established a centre of excellence for advanced research in neurochemistry and glycobiology, known to be the first of its kind in the world. Under his directorship, Indian Institute of Chemical Biology, developed into a major research center of contemporary biology. Later, at the University of Delhi, he established the Department of Biochemistry.

The first of Bachhawat's major research findings came when he was working with Minor J. Coon at the University of Michigan. Both the scientists together discovered HMG-CoA lyase, an intermediate in the mevalonate and ketogenesis pathway, thus broadening the understanding of the formation of ketone bodies in mammals, which was later elucidated further in his article Enzymic cleavage of p-Hydroxy-f3-Methyl-Glutaryl coenzyme A 10 acetoacctate and acetyl coenzyme A., published in 1995. On his return to India, he focused his studies on amino acids and inorganic sulphate metabolism, as well as glycosaminoglycan. His researches revealed, for the first time, that metachromatic leukodystrophy, an autosomal recessive disease, was caused by the absence of Arylsulfatase A, an enzyme responsible for the breaking down on sulfatides. This discovery assisted other scientists in the elucidation of similar glycolipid storage diseases such as Gaucher's disease and Tay–Sachs disease and in their prenatal diagnosis. His proposals on the biosynthesis and degradation of cerebroside-3-sulfate, a lipid found in high concentrations in patients afflicted with metachromatic leukodystrophy were known to have helped in the latter-day therapeutic protocols.

Bachhawat and his colleagues were credited with the discovery of CMP-N-acetylneuraminic acid which led to the understanding of the occurrence of N-acetylneuraminic acid at cell-surfaces. His studies explained the role of glycosaminoglycans in neuronal development and the property of glycolipids as biological receptors. On the therapeutic side, he proposed ways for in situ delivery of drugs and enzymes to the affected organs, using sugar-bearing liposomes. He also worked on the therapy of systemic fungal infections by developing liposomal formulations.

On the academic front, he contributed in developing the departments he helped establish at CMC Vellore and Delhi University into centes of excellence in research. His researches have been documented by way of over 150 scientific papers published in refereed journals and he has also edited a number of books. He served as a member of the editorial board of Indian Journal of Biochemistry and Biophysics and he mentored 42 research scholars for master's and doctoral studies. Apart from the International Union of Biochemistry and Molecular Biology congress of 1994, he was a part of the organizing committee of many other international conferences held in India.

== Selected articles ==
- Austin J. H.; Balasubramanian A. S.; Partabiraman T. N.; Saraswati. S.; Basu D. K. & Bachhawat (1963). "Controlled study of enzyme activities in three human disorders of glycolipid metabolism (gangoylism and metachromatic and globoid leukodystrophy)". J. Neurochem. 10 (11): 805–816. doi:10.1111/j.1471-4159.1963.tb11905.x. PMID 14086829. S2CID 38161295.
- Singh M. & Bachhawat B.K. (1965). "Distribution and variation with age of different uronic acid-containing mucopolysaccharide in brain". Neurochem. 12 (6): 529–535. doi:10.1111/j.1471-4159.1965.tb06779.x. PMID 5830953. S2CID 36772874.
- Balasubramanian A. S.; Bachhawat. B. K. (1965). "Formation of cerebroside sulfate from 3'-phosphoadenosine-5'phosphosulfate in sheep brain". Biochim. Biophys. Acta. 106 (1): 218–220. doi:10.1016/0005-2760(65)90115-3. PMID 4954549.
- Bimal K Bachhawat; James Austin; Donald Armstrong (1967). "A Cerebroside Sulphotransferase Deficiency in a Human Disorder of Myelin". Biochem. J. 104 (4): 15C–17C. doi:10.1042/bj1040015C. PMC 1270641. PMID 4860468.
- Chandrasekaran E.V.; Bachhawat B. K. (November 1969). "Isolation and characterization of glycosaminoglycans in peripheral nerve and spinal cord of monkey". J. Neurochem. 16 (11): 1529–1532. doi:10.1111/j.1471-4159.1969.tb09908.x. PMID 4245162. S2CID 13984950.
- Shoyab, Bachhawat B. K. (1967). "Enzymic degradation of cytidine 5'-monophosphate-N-acetylneuraminic acid". Biochem. J. 102 (2): 13C1–4C. doi:10.1042/bj1020013C. PMC 1270291. PMID 6029591.
- Singh M.; Bachhawal B. K. (1968). "Isolation and characterization of glycosaminoglycans in human brain of different groups". J. Neurochem. 15 (3): 249–258. doi:10.1111/j.1471-4159.1968.tb06204.x. PMID 5644207. S2CID 9364246.
- Balasubramanian A. S.; Bachhawat B. K. (1970). "Sulfate metabolism in brain". Brain Res. 20 (3): 341–360. doi:10.1016/0006-8993(70)90165-4. PMID 4247104.
- Balasubramanian A. S.; Bachhawat B. K. (June 1970). "Sulfate metabolism in brain". Brain Res. 20 (3): 341–360. doi:10.1016/0006-8993(70)90165-4. PMID 4247104.
- Farooqui, Bachhawat B. K. (1973). "Enzymic desulfation of cerebroside-3'-sulfate by chicken brain arylsulfatase". J. Neurochem. 20 (3): 889–891. doi:10.1111/j.1471-4159.1973.tb00049.x. PMID 4703798. S2CID 17202139.
- Surolia, Bachhawat B. K.; Podder S. K. (1975). "Interaction between lectin from Ricinus communis and liposome containing gangliosides". Nature. 257 (5529): 802–804. Bibcode:1975Natur.257..802S. doi:10.1038/257802a0. PMID 1186866. S2CID 4245681.
- Mumtaz, Ghosh C.; Bachhawat B. K. (1991). "Design of liposomes for circumventing the reticuloendothelial cells". Glycobiology. 1 (5): 505–10. doi:10.1093/glycob/1.5.505. PMID 1726577.
- Bachhawat B. K.; Robinson W. M. G.; Coon, M. J. (1955). "The enzymatic cleavage of beta-hydroxy-beta-methylglutaryl coenzyme A to acetoacetate and acetyl coenzyme A." The Journal of Biological Chemistry. 216 (2): 727–36. doi:10.1016/S0021-9258(19)81427-8. PMID 13271348.

== Awards and honors ==
Bimal Kumar Bachhawat received the Shanti Swarup Bhatnagar Prize for Biological sciences of the Council of Scientific and Industrial Research, the highest Indian award in science and technology, in 1962. He was awarded Amrut Mody Research Foundation Award in 1974, the Golden Jubilee Award of the Indian Institute of Science (IISc) in 1976, and the FICCI Award of the Federation of Indian Chambers of Commerce & Industry in 1982. R. D. Birla Smarak Kosh Award reached him in 1986 and the Government of India included him the Republic Day Honours list for the civilian award of the Padma Bhushan in 1990. A recipient of the Outstanding Teacher Award, Bachhawat also delivered several award orations; J. C. Bose Memorial Award (1980) and B. C. Guha Award (1984) of the Indian Science Congress Association, R. N. Chopra Lectureship (1977), Prof, J. B. Chatterji Memorial Oration and Gold Medal of Calcutta School of Tropical Medicine and Distinguished Scientist Lecture of the Council of Scientific and Industrial Research (1989) are some of the notable ones among them.

Bachhawat was elected as a fellow by the Indian National Science Academy in 1973, and a year later, the Indian Academy of Sciences inducted him as their fellow. He was also an elected fellow of the National Academy of Sciences, India and held the Bhatnagar Fellowship of the Council of Scientific and Industrial Research since 1990. The National Academy of Sciences, India, jointly with Jaypee Institute of Information Technology (JIIT), have instituted an annual oration, Professor B. K. Bachhawat Memorial Lecture, in his honor. Phytochemicals & Human Health: Pharmacological & Molecular Aspects - A Tribute to Late Professor Bimal Kumar Bachhawat is a text on phytochemicals published by Nova Science Publishers in honor of Bachhawat in 2011.

== Trivia ==
- Bachhawat was known to have been fascinated by the Louis Pasteur saying, In the field of experimentation, chance favors only the prepared mind.
- Human Genomics and the ethical and socio-economic issues related to it were topics of interest to him.
- The brain storming sessions he organized during his tenancy as the chairman of the CSIR Technical Advisory Board later developed into a full-fledged movement, the Molecular Immunology Forum, which meets every year.

== See also ==
- Minor J. Coon
- Gaucher's disease
- Tay–Sachs disease
- CMP-N-acetylneuraminic acid
