= Acetoacetyl-CoA synthase =

Class of enzymes

Identifiers
- EC no.: 2.3.1.194

Databases
- IntEnz: IntEnz view
- BRENDA: BRENDA entry
- ExPASy: NiceZyme view
- KEGG: KEGG entry
- MetaCyc: metabolic pathway
- PRIAM: profile
- PDB structures: RCSB PDB PDBe PDBsum
Search
- PMC: articles
- PubMed: articles
- NCBI: proteins

Acetoacetyl-CoA synthase (EC 2.3.1.194, NphT7) is an enzyme with systematic name acetyl-CoA:malonyl-CoA C-acetyltransferase (decarboxylating). This enzyme catalyses the following chemical reaction

malonyl-CoA
+
acetyl-CoA
CO_{2}
acetoacetyl-CoA
+ coenzyme A

The enzyme from the soil bacterium Streptomyces sp. CL190 produces acetoacetyl-CoA, which is incorporated into the mevalonate pathway.
