= HMG-CoA reductase (NADH) =

Class of enzymes

Hydroxymethylglutaryl-CoA reductase

Identifiers
- EC no.: 1.1.1.88
- CAS no.: 37250-24-1

Databases
- BRENDA: enzyme data
- ExPASy: NiceZyme view
- KEGG: enzyme entry
- MetaCyc: metabolic pathway
- Rhea: reactions
- PDB structures: RCSB PDB PDBe PDBsum
Search
- PMC: articles
- PubMed: articles
- NCBI: proteins

In enzymology, hydroxymethylglutaryl-CoA reductase (EC 1.1.1.88) is an enzyme that catalyzes the chemical reaction

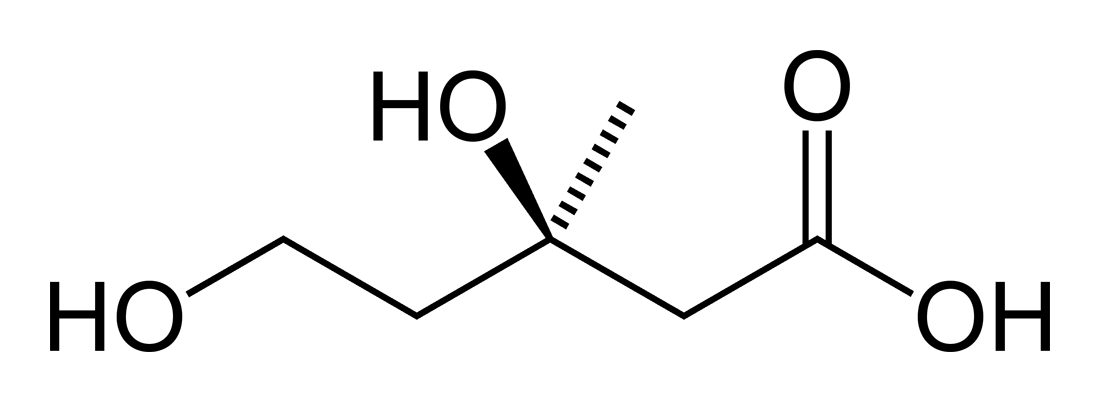
Mevalonic acid
+ Coenzyme A + 2 NAD^{+}
2 H^{+}
2 H^{+}
HMG-CoA
+ 2 NADH

The substrates of this enzyme are mevalonic acid, coenzyme A, and oxidised nicotinamide adenine dinucleotide (NAD^{+}). Its products are 3-hydroxy-3-methylglutaryl-CoA (HMG-CoA), reduced NADH, and two protons.

This enzyme belongs to the family of oxidoreductases, specifically those acting on the CH-OH group of donor with NAD^{+} or NADP^{+} as acceptor. The systematic name of this enzyme class is (R)-mevalonate:NAD^{+} oxidoreductase (CoA-acylating). Other names in common use include beta-hydroxy-beta-methylglutaryl coenzyme A reductase, beta-hydroxy-beta-methylglutaryl CoA-reductase, 3-hydroxy-3-methylglutaryl coenzyme A reductase, and hydroxymethylglutaryl coenzyme A reductase.
