= Isopentenyl-diphosphate delta isomerase =

Class of enzymes

isopentenyl-diphosphate Δ-isomerase
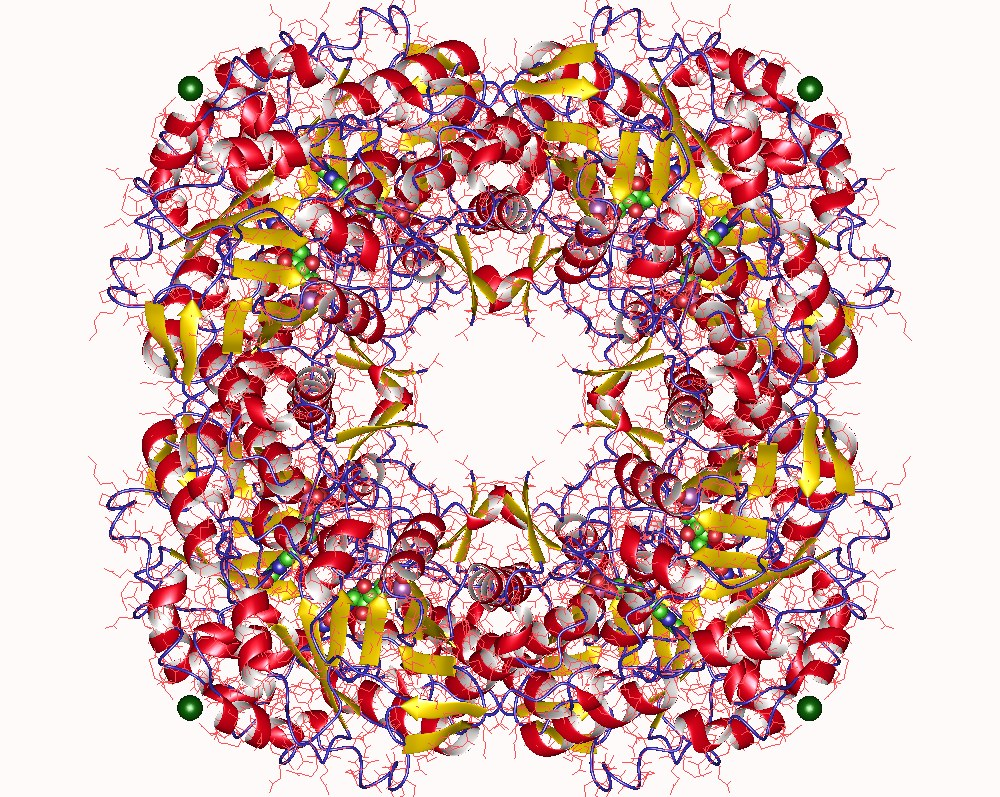
- Isopentenyl-diphosphate delta isomerase octamer, Thermus thermophilus

Identifiers
- EC no.: 5.3.3.2
- CAS no.: 9033-27-6

Databases
- BRENDA: enzyme data
- ExPASy: NiceZyme view
- KEGG: enzyme entry
- MetaCyc: metabolic pathway
- Rhea: reactions
- PDB structures: RCSB PDB PDBe PDBsum
- Gene Ontology: AmiGO / QuickGO
Search
- PMC: articles
- PubMed: articles
- NCBI: proteins

Isopentenyl pyrophosphate isomerase (EC 5.3.3.2, IPP isomerase), also known as Isopentenyl-diphosphate delta isomerase, is an isomerase that catalyzes the conversion of the relatively un-reactive isopentenyl pyrophosphate (IPP) to the more-reactive electrophile dimethylallyl pyrophosphate (DMAPP). This isomerization is a key step in the biosynthesis of isoprenoids through the mevalonate pathway and the MEP pathway.

isopentenyl diphosphate $\rightleftharpoons$ dimethylallyl diphosphate

This enzyme belongs to the family of isomerases, specifically those intramolecular oxidoreductases transposing C=C bonds.

== Nomenclature ==
The systematic name of this enzyme class is isopentenyl-diphosphate Delta3-Delta2-isomerase.

Other names in common use include:

- isopentenylpyrophosphate Delta-isomerase,
- methylbutenylpyrophosphate isomerase, and
- isopentenylpyrophosphate isomerase.

== Isozymes ==
In humans, there are two isozymes of isopentenyl pyrophosphate isomerase, each encoded by a separate gene:

Isopentenyl-pyrophosphate Δ isomerase 1

Identifiers
- Symbol: IDI1
- NCBI gene: 3422
- HGNC: 5387
- OMIM: 604055
- RefSeq: NM_004508
- UniProt: Q13907

Other data
- EC number: 5.3.3.2
- Locus: Chr. 10 p15.3
Search for
- Structures: Swiss-model
- Domains: InterPro

Isopentenyl-pyrophosphate Δ isomerase 2

Identifiers
- Symbol: IDI2
- Alt. symbols: IPPI2
- NCBI gene: 91734
- HGNC: 23487
- OMIM: 615389
- RefSeq: NM_033261
- UniProt: Q9BXS1

Other data
- EC number: 5.3.3.2
- Locus: Chr. 10
Search for
- Structures: Swiss-model
- Domains: InterPro

== Mechanism ==
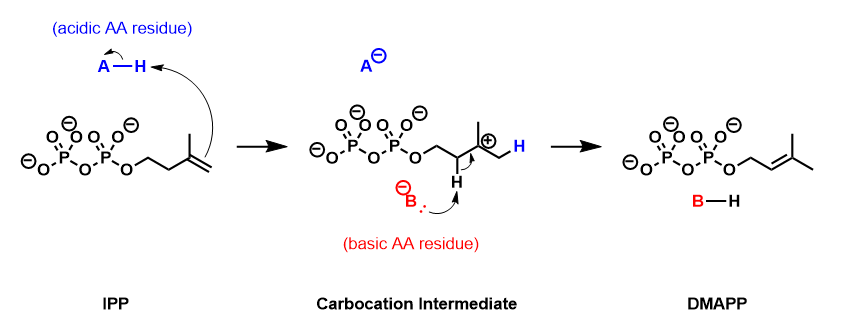
The mechanism for the isomerization between IPP and DMAPP. Generic proton donors and acceptors are shown because the identities of the amino acids that carry out these functions have not conclusively been established.

IPP isomerase catalyzes the isomerization of IPP to DMAPP by an antarafacial transposition of hydrogen. The empirical evidence suggests that this reaction proceeds by a protonation/deprotonation mechanism, with the addition of a proton to the re-face of the inactivated C_{3}-C_{4} double bond resulting in a transient carbocation intermediate. The removal of the pro-R proton from C_{2} forms the C_{2}-C_{3} double bond of DMAPP.

== Structure ==
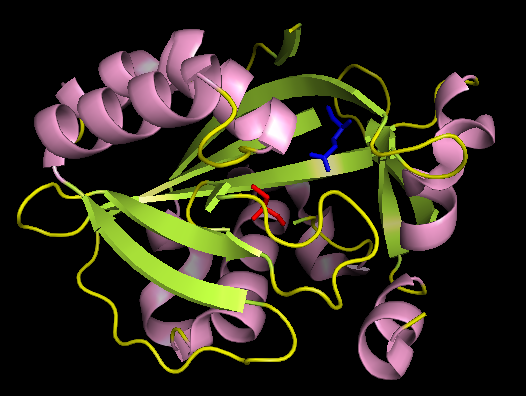
A cartoon diagram of human IPP isomerase with the catalytic cysteine residue (Cys87) in red and the catalytic glutamic acid residue (Glu149) in blue (RCSB Protein Data Bank accession number 2ICJ).

Crystallographic studies have observed that the active form of IPP isomerase is a monomer with alternating α-helices and β-sheets. The active site of IPP isomerase is deeply buried within the enzyme and consists of a glutamic acid residue and a cysteine residue that interact with opposite sides of the IPP substrate, consistent with the antarafacial stereochemistry of isomerization. The origin of the initial protonation step has not been conclusively established. Recent evidence suggests that the glutamic acid residue is involved in the protonating step despite the observation that its carboxylic acid side-chain is stabilized in its carboxylate form. This discrepancy has been addressed by the discovery of a water molecule in the active site of human IPP isomerase, suggesting a mechanism where the glutamine residue polarizes the double bond of IPP and makes it more susceptible to protonation by water.

IPP isomerase also requires a divalent cation to fold into its active conformation. The enzyme contains several amino acids, including the catalytic glutamate, that are involved in coordinating with Mg^{2+} or Mn^{2+}. The coordination of the metal cation to the glutamate residue stabilizes the carbiocation intermediate after protonation.

== function ==
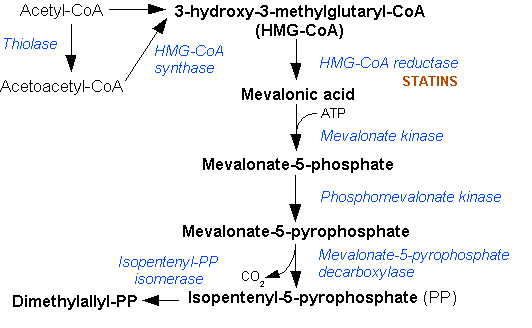
Mevalonate pathway

The protonation of an inactivated double bond is rarely seen in nature, highlighting the unique catalytic mechanism of IPP isomerase. The isomerization of IPP to DMAPP is a crucial step in the synthesis of isoprenoids and isoprenoid-derivatives, compounds that play vital roles in the biosynthetic pathways of all living organisms. Because of the importance of the mevalonate pathway in isoprenoid biosynthesis, IPP isomerase is found in a variety of different cellular compartments, including plastids and mammalian mitochondria.

== Disease relevance ==
Mutations in IDI1, the gene that codes for IPP isomerase 1, have been implicated in decreased viability in a number of organisms, including the yeast Saccharomyces cerevisiae, the nematode Caenorhabditis elegans and the plant Arabidopsis thaliana. While there have been no evidence directly implicating IDI1 mutations in human disease, genomic analysis has identified a copy-number gain near two IPP isomerase genes in a substantial proportion of patients with sporadic amyotrophic lateral sclerosis, suggesting that the isomerase may play a role in this disease.
