= 3-Hydroxy-3-methylglutaryl-CoA lyase =

Class of enzymes

Hydroxymethylglutaryl-CoA lyase
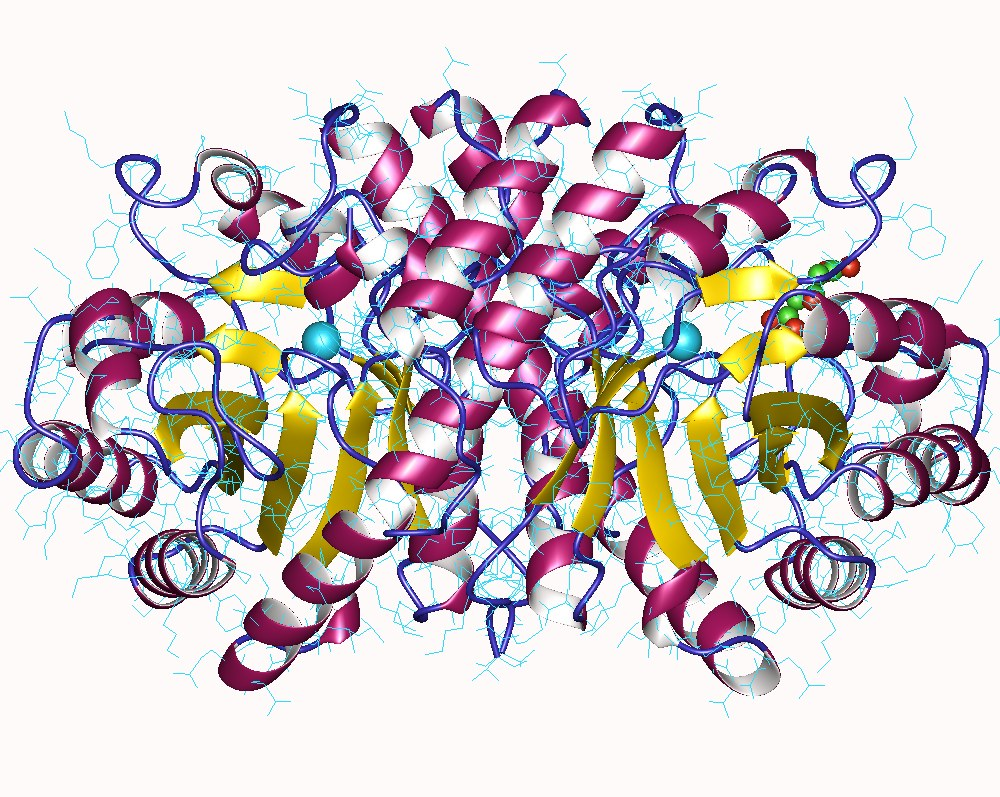
- HMG-CoA lyase dimer, Human

Identifiers
- EC no.: 4.1.3.4
- CAS no.: 9030-83-5

Databases
- BRENDA: enzyme data
- ExPASy: NiceZyme view
- KEGG: enzyme entry
- MetaCyc: metabolic pathway
- Rhea: reactions
- PDB structures: RCSB PDB PDBe PDBsum
- Gene Ontology: AmiGO / QuickGO
Search
- PMC: articles
- PubMed: articles
- NCBI: proteins

A 3-Hydroxy-3-methylglutaryl-CoA lyase (EC 4.1.3.4), or HMG-CoA lyase, is a type of enzyme that catalyzes the chemical reaction:

(3S)-3-hydroxy-3-methylglutaryl-CoA = acetoacetate + acetyl-CoA

In humans, there are two known isoforms: HMG-CoA lyase, mitochondrial (sometimes just called HMG-CoA lyase) which is encoded by the HMGCL gene, and HMG-CoA lyase, cytoplasmic, encoded by the gene HMGCLL1 (and sometimes referred to as HMGCL-like 1). This enzyme catalyzes a key step in ketogenesis, and is also involved in breaking down leucine.
