= Acetoacetyl-CoA =

Names
- IUPAC name 3′-O-Phosphonoadenosine 5′-[(3R)-3-hydroxy-2,2-dimethyl-4-oxo-4-{[3-oxo-3-({2-[(3-oxobutanoyl)sulfanyl]ethyl}amino)propyl]amino}butyl dihydrogen diphosphate]
- Systematic IUPAC name O^{1}-{[(2R,3S,4R,5R)-5-(6-Amino-9H-purin-9-yl)-4-hydroxy-3-(phosphonooxy)oxolan-2-yl]methyl} O^{3}-[(3R)-3-hydroxy-2,2-dimethyl-4-oxo-4-{[3-oxo-3-({2-[(3-oxobutanoyl)sulfanyl]ethyl}amino)propyl]amino}butyl] dihydrogen diphosphate

Identifiers
CAS Number	1420-36-6
3D model (JSmol)	Interactive image
ChEBI	CHEBI:15345
ChemSpider	83198
ECHA InfoCard	100.014.378
IUPHAR/BPS	3039
MeSH	acetoacetyl+CoA
PubChem CID	74
CompTox Dashboard (EPA)	DTXSID30931292
- InChI: InChI=1S/C25H40N7O18P3S/c1-13(33)8-16(35)54-7-6-27-15(34)4-5-28-23(38)20(37)25(2,3)10-47-53(44,45)50-52(42,43)46-9-14-19(49-51(39,40)41)18(36)24(48-14)32-12-31-17-21(26)29-11-30-22(17)32/h11-12,14,18-20,24,36-37H,4-10H2,1-3H3,(H,27,34)(H,28,38)(H,42,43)(H,44,45)(H2,26,29,30)(H2,39,40,41)/t14-,18-,19-,20+,24-/m1/s1 Key: OJFDKHTZOUZBOS-CITAKDKDSA-N; InChI=1/C25H40N7O18P3S/c1-13(33)8-16(35)54-7-6-27-15(34)4-5-28-23(38)20(37)25(2,3)10-47-53(44,45)50-52(42,43)46-9-14-19(49-51(39,40)41)18(36)24(48-14)32-12-31-17-21(26)29-11-30-22(17)32/h11-12,14,18-20,24,36-37H,4-10H2,1-3H3,(H,27,34)(H,28,38)(H,42,43)(H,44,45)(H2,26,29,30)(H2,39,40,41)/t14-,18-,19-,20+,24-/m1/s1 Key: OJFDKHTZOUZBOS-CITAKDKDBD
- SMILES: O=C(C)CC(=O)SCCNC(=O)CCNC(=O)[C@H](O)C(C)(C)COP(=O)(O)OP(=O)(O)OC[C@H]3O[C@@H](n2cnc1c(ncnc12)N)[C@H](O)[C@@H]3OP(=O)(O)O

Properties
Chemical formula	C_{25}H_{40}N_{7}O_{18}P_{3}S
Molar mass	851.61 g·mol^{−1}
- Except where otherwise noted, data are given for materials in their standard state (at 25 °C [77 °F], 100 kPa). verify (what is ?) Infobox references

Acetoacetyl CoA is the precursor of HMG-CoA in the mevalonate pathway, which is essential for cholesterol biosynthesis. It also takes a similar role in the ketone bodies synthesis (ketogenesis) pathway of the liver. In the ketone bodies digestion pathway (in the tissue), it is no longer associated with having HMG-CoA as a product or as a reactant.

It is created from acetyl-CoA, a thioester, which reacts with the enolate of a second molecule of acetyl-CoA in a Claisen condensation reaction, and it is acted upon by HMG-CoA synthase to form HMG-CoA. During the metabolism of leucine, this last reaction is reversed. Some individuals may experience Acetoacetyl-CoA deficiency. This deficiency is classified as a disorder ketone body and isoleucine metabolism that can be inherited. Additional mutations include those with the enzymes within pathways related to Acetoacetyl CoA, including Beta-Ketothiolase deficiency and Mitochondrial 3-hydroxy-3-methylglutaryl-CoA Synthase mutation.

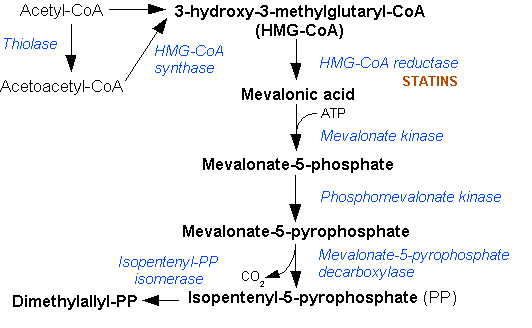
Mevalonate pathway

Additionally, it reacts with NADPH-dependent acetoacetyl-coenzyme A reductase, also known as PhaB, in a pathway that produces polyester polyhydroxyalkanoate (PHA). The reduction of acetoacetyl-coA by Pha creates (R)-3-hydroxybutyryl-CoA, which polymerizes to PHA. The pathway is present in bacteria such as Ralstonia eutropha and the PCC6803 strain of Synechocystis. Mover over, Acetoacetyl-CoA is involved with neuronal development involving lipogenesis and providing fats and cholesterol for neuronal cells.

== Mutations ==
Mitochondrial acetoacetyl-CoA thiolase, also known as thiolase II, the enzyme responsible for catalyzing the synthesis of acetoacetyl-CoA within ketogenesis as mentioned, is also involved within acetoacetyl-CoA cleavage in ketolysis. It is observed to play a role within cleavage of acetyl-CoA from acetoacetyl-CoA and 2-methylacetoacetyl-CoA. The enzyme is involved in an autosomal recessive disorders that impacts the catabolism of ketone bodies and isoleucine: beta-ketothiolase deficiency, leading to their deficiency within mitochondria. The mutation takes place within the acetoacetyl-CoA thiolase (ACAT) gene mapped on chromosome 11q22.3-23.1.

Mutations in mitochondrial 3-hydroxy-3-methylglutaryl-CoA synthase (HMG-CoA synthase) is another inherited autosomal recessive disorder affecting the catabolism of ketone bodies and can lead to the build-up of acetoacetyl-CoA.

== Additional application ==
Acetoacetyl-CoA also behaves as a product of acetoacetyl-CoA synthetase (AACS) within the cytosol, using acetoacetate as the substrate, the reaction provides acetyl groups for lipogenesis. Understanding acetoacetyl-CoA is important in cholesterol development and lipogenesis and Acetoacetyl-CoA synthetase playing a role in its development, it also plays a significant role within the brain. Cholesterol and fats have been observed in high concentrations within neuronal tissue, as well as high AACS mRNA expression levels within cells of the hippocampus and cortical region. In addition, they play a significant role in neuronal development during the early embryonic and fetal developmental stages.

== See also ==
- Mevalonate pathway
- Acetoacetic acid
- Beta-hydroxybutyryl-CoA dehydrogenase
