= Keto diet =

Keto diet may refer to:

- A low-carbohydrate diet (high in fat) mainly used for weight loss in adults
- The ketogenic diet, a special diet for treating epilepsy, mostly in children
