= HMG-CoA =

Names
- IUPAC name (9R,21S)-1-[(2R,3S,4R,5R)-5-(6-amino-9H-purin-9-yl)-4-hydroxy-3-(phosphonooxy)tetrahydrofuran-2-yl]-3,5,9,21-tetrahydroxy-8,8,21-trimethyl-10,14,19-trioxo-2,4,6-trioxa-18-thia-11,15-diaza-3,5-diphosphatricosan-23-oic acid 3,5-dioxide
- Other names 3-hydroxy-3-methylglutaryl CoA; 3-hydroxy-3-methylglutaryl coenzyme A

Identifiers
CAS Number	1553-55-5
3D model (JSmol)	Interactive image
ChEBI	CHEBI:61659
ChemSpider	392859
ECHA InfoCard	100.014.820
IUPHAR/BPS	3040
MeSH	HMG-CoA
PubChem CID	445127
CompTox Dashboard (EPA)	DTXSID40862689 DTXSID00935181, DTXSID40862689
- InChI: InChI=1S/C27H44N7O20P3S/c1-26(2,21(40)24(41)30-5-4-15(35)29-6-7-58-17(38)9-27(3,42)8-16(36)37)11-51-57(48,49)54-56(46,47)50-10-14-20(53-55(43,44)45)19(39)25(52-14)34-13-33-18-22(28)31-12-32-23(18)34/h12-14,19-21,25,39-40,42H,4-11H2,1-3H3,(H,29,35)(H,30,41)(H,36,37)(H,46,47)(H,48,49)(H2,28,31,32)(H2,43,44,45)/t14-,19-,20-,21+,25-,27+/m1/s1 Key: CABVTRNMFUVUDM-VRHQGPGLSA-N; InChI=1/C27H44N7O20P3S/c1-26(2,21(40)24(41)30-5-4-15(35)29-6-7-58-17(38)9-27(3,42)8-16(36)37)11-51-57(48,49)54-56(46,47)50-10-14-20(53-55(43,44)45)19(39)25(52-14)34-13-33-18-22(28)31-12-32-23(18)34/h12-14,19-21,25,39-40,42H,4-11H2,1-3H3,(H,29,35)(H,30,41)(H,36,37)(H,46,47)(H,48,49)(H2,28,31,32)(H2,43,44,45)/t14-,19-,20-,21+,25-,27+/m1/s1 Key: CABVTRNMFUVUDM-VRHQGPGLBX
- SMILES: O=C(O)C[C@@](O)(C)CC(=O)SCCNC(=O)CCNC(=O)[C@H](O)C(C)(C)COP(=O)(O)OP(=O)(O)OC[C@H]3O[C@@H](n2cnc1c(ncnc12)N)[C@H](O)[C@@H]3OP(=O)(O)O

Properties
Chemical formula	C_{27}H_{44}N_{7}O_{20}P_{3}S
Molar mass	911.661 g/mol
- Except where otherwise noted, data are given for materials in their standard state (at 25 °C [77 °F], 100 kPa). verify (what is ?) Infobox references

β-Hydroxy β-methylglutaryl-CoA (HMG-CoA), also known as 3-hydroxy-3-methylglutaryl coenzyme A, is an intermediate in the mevalonate and ketogenesis pathways. It is formed from acetyl CoA and acetoacetyl CoA by HMG-CoA synthase. The research of Minor J. Coon and Bimal Kumar Bachhawat in the 1950s at University of Illinois led to its discovery.

HMG-CoA is a metabolic intermediate in the metabolism of the branched-chain amino acids, which include leucine, isoleucine, and valine. Its immediate precursors are β-methylglutaconyl-CoA (MG-CoA) and β-hydroxy β-methylbutyryl-CoA (HMB-CoA).

HMG-CoA reductase catalyzes the conversion of HMG-CoA to mevalonic acid, a necessary step in the biosynthesis of cholesterol.

== Biosynthesis ==
Leucine metabolism in humans

Human metabolic pathway for HMB and isovaleryl-CoA relative to L-leucine. Of the two major pathways, L-leucine is mostly metabolized into isovaleryl-CoA, while only about 5% is metabolized into HMB.

== Mevalonate pathway ==
Mevalonate synthesis begins with the beta-ketothiolase-catalyzed Claisen condensation of two molecules of acetyl-CoA to produce acetoacetyl CoA. The following reaction involves the joining of acetyl-CoA and acetoacetyl-CoA to form HMG-CoA, a process catalyzed by HMG-CoA synthase.

In the final step of mevalonate biosynthesis, HMG-CoA reductase, an NADPH-dependent oxidoreductase, catalyzes the conversion of HMG-CoA into mevalonate, which is the primary regulatory point in this pathway. Mevalonate serves as the precursor to isoprenoid groups that are incorporated into a wide variety of end-products, including cholesterol in humans.

Mevalonate pathway

== Ketogenesis pathway ==
HMG-CoA lyase breaks it into acetyl CoA and acetoacetate.

Ketogenesis

== See also ==
- Steroidogenic enzyme
