= Ketone bodies =

Chemicals produced during fat metabolism

Ketone bodies

Acetone

Acetoacetic acid

(R)-beta-Hydroxybutyric acid

Ketone bodies are water-soluble molecules or compounds that contain the ketone groups produced from fatty acids by the liver (ketogenesis). Ketone bodies are readily transported into tissues outside the liver, where they are converted into acetyl-CoA (acetyl-Coenzyme A) – which then enters the citric acid cycle (Krebs cycle) and is oxidized for energy. These liver-derived ketone groups include acetoacetic acid (acetoacetate), beta-hydroxybutyrate, and acetone, a spontaneous breakdown product of acetoacetate (see graphic).

Ketone bodies are produced by the liver during periods of caloric restriction of various scenarios: low food intake (fasting), carbohydrate restrictive diets, starvation, prolonged intense exercise, alcoholism, or during untreated (or inadequately treated) type 1 diabetes mellitus. Ketone bodies are produced in liver cells by the breakdown of fatty acids. They are released into the blood after glycogen stores in the liver have been depleted. (Glycogen stores typically are depleted within the first 24 hours of fasting.)

When two acetyl-CoA molecules lose their -CoAs (or coenzyme A groups), they can form a (covalent) dimer called acetoacetate. β-hydroxybutyrate is a reduced form of acetoacetate, in which the ketone group is converted into an alcohol (or hydroxyl) group (see illustration on the right). Both are 4-carbon molecules that can readily be converted back into acetyl-CoA by most tissues of the body, with the notable exception of the liver. Acetone is the decarboxylated form of acetoacetate which cannot be converted back into acetyl-CoA except via detoxification in the liver where it is converted into lactic acid, which can, in turn, be oxidized into pyruvic acid, and only then into acetyl-CoA.

Ketone bodies have a characteristic smell, which can easily be detected in the breath of persons in ketosis and ketoacidosis. It is often described as fruity or like nail polish remover (which usually contains acetone or ethyl acetate).

Apart from the three endogenous ketone bodies, other ketone bodies like β-ketopentanoate and β-hydroxypentanoate may be created as a result of the metabolism of synthetic triglycerides, such as triheptanoin.

== Production ==
Acetyl-CoA with the acetyl group indicated in blue.

Fats stored in adipose tissue are released from the fat cells into the blood as free fatty acids and glycerol when insulin levels are low and glucagon and epinephrine levels in the blood are high. This occurs between meals, during fasting, starvation and strenuous exercise, when blood glucose levels are likely to fall. Fatty acids are very high energy fuels and are taken up by all metabolizing cells that have mitochondria. This is because fatty acids can only be metabolized in the mitochondria. Red blood cells do not contain mitochondria and are therefore entirely dependent on anaerobic glycolysis for their energy requirements. In all other tissues, the fatty acids that enter the metabolizing cells are combined with coenzyme A to form acyl-CoA chains. These are transferred into the mitochondria of the cells, where they are broken down into acetyl-CoA units by a sequence of reactions known as β-oxidation.

The acetyl-CoA produced by β-oxidation enters the citric acid cycle in the mitochondrion by combining with oxaloacetate to form citrate. This results in the complete combustion of the acetyl group of acetyl-CoA (see diagram above, on the right) to CO_{2} and water. The energy released in this process is captured in the form of 1 GTP and 9 ATP molecules per acetyl group (or acetic acid molecule) oxidized. This is the fate of acetyl-CoA wherever β-oxidation of fatty acids occurs, except under certain circumstances in the liver. In the liver oxaloacetate is wholly or partially diverted into the gluconeogenic pathway during fasting, starvation, a low carbohydrate diet, prolonged strenuous exercise, and in uncontrolled type 1 diabetes mellitus. Under these circumstances oxaloacetate is hydrogenated to malate which is then removed from the mitochondrion to be converted into glucose in the cytoplasm of the liver cells, from where the glucose is released into the blood. In the liver, therefore, oxaloacetate is unavailable for condensation with acetyl-CoA when significant gluconeogenesis has been stimulated by low (or absent) insulin and high glucagon concentrations in the blood. Under these circumstances, acetyl-CoA is diverted to the formation of acetoacetate and beta-hydroxybutyrate. Acetoacetate, beta-hydroxybutyrate, and their spontaneous breakdown product, acetone, are known as ketone bodies. The ketone bodies are released by the liver into the blood. All cells with mitochondria can take ketone bodies up from the blood and reconvert them into acetyl-CoA, which can then be used as fuel in their citric acid cycles, as no other tissue can divert its oxaloacetate into the gluconeogenic pathway in the way that the liver does this. Unlike free fatty acids, ketone bodies can cross the blood–brain barrier and are therefore available as fuel for the cells of the central nervous system, acting as a substitute for glucose, on which these cells normally survive. The occurrence of high levels of ketone bodies in the blood during starvation, a low carbohydrate diet and prolonged heavy exercise can lead to ketosis, and in its extreme form in out-of-control type 1 diabetes mellitus, as ketoacidosis.

Acetoacetate has a highly characteristic smell, for the people who can detect this smell, which occurs in the breath and urine during ketosis. On the other hand, most people can smell acetone, whose "sweet & fruity" odor also characterizes the breath of persons in ketosis or, especially, ketoacidosis.

== Fuel utilization across different organs ==
Ketone bodies can be used as fuel in the heart, brain and muscle, but not the liver. They yield 2 guanosine triphosphate (GTP) and 22 adenosine triphosphate (ATP) molecules per acetoacetate molecule when oxidized in the mitochondria. Ketone bodies are transported from the liver to other tissues, where acetoacetate and β-hydroxybutyrate can be reconverted to acetyl-CoA to produce reducing equivalents (NADH and FADH_{2}), via the citric acid cycle. Though it is the source of ketone bodies, the liver cannot use them for energy because it lacks the enzyme thiophorase (β-ketoacyl-CoA transferase). Acetone is taken up by the liver in low concentrations and undergoes detoxification through the methylglyoxal pathway which ends with lactate. Acetone in high concentrations, as can occur with prolonged fasting or a ketogenic diet, is absorbed by cells outside the liver and metabolized through a different pathway via propylene glycol. Though the pathway follows a different series of steps requiring ATP, propylene glycol can eventually be turned into pyruvate.

=== Heart ===
Under normal physiologic conditions fatty acids provide the majority (60–90%) of metabolic energy production in the heart. However, under ketotic conditions, the heart will burn ketone bodies in preference to fatty acids.

=== Brain ===
The brain gets a portion of its fuel requirements from ketone bodies when glucose is less available than normal. In the event of low glucose concentration in the blood, most other tissues have alternative fuel sources besides ketone bodies and glucose (such as fatty acids), but studies have indicated that the brain has an obligatory requirement for some glucose. After strict fasting for 3 days, the brain gets 25% of its energy from ketone bodies. After about 24 days, ketone bodies become the major fuel of the brain, making up to two-thirds of brain fuel consumption. Many studies suggest that human brain cells can survive with little or no glucose, but proving the point is ethically questionable. During the initial stages of ketosis, the brain does not burn ketones, since they are an important substrate for lipid synthesis in the brain. Furthermore, ketones produced from omega-3 fatty acids may reduce cognitive deterioration in old age.

Ketogenesis helped fuel the enlargement of the human brain during its evolution. It was previously proposed that ketogenesis is key to the evolution and viability of bigger brains in general. However, the loss of HMGCS2 (and consequently this ability) in three large-brained mammalian lineages (cetaceans, elephants–mastodons, Old World fruit bats) shows otherwise. Out of the three lineages, only fruit bats have the expected sensitivity to starvation; the other two have found alternative ways to fuel the body during starvation.

== Ketosis and ketoacidosis ==
In normal individuals, there is a constant production of ketone bodies by the liver and their utilization by extrahepatic tissues. The concentration of ketone bodies in blood is maintained around 1 mg/dL. Their excretion in urine is very low and undetectable by routine urine tests (Rothera's test).

When the rate of synthesis of ketone bodies exceeds the rate of utilization, their concentration in blood increases; this is known as ketonemia. This is followed by ketonuria – excretion of ketone bodies in urine. The overall picture of ketonemia and ketonuria is commonly referred to as ketosis. The smell of acetoacetate and/or acetone in breath is a common feature in ketosis.

When a type 1 diabetic suffers acute biological stress (infection, heart attack, or physical trauma) or fails to administer enough insulin, they may enter the pathological state of diabetic ketoacidosis. Under these circumstances, the low or absent insulin levels in the blood, combined with the inappropriately high glucagon concentrations, induce the liver to produce glucose at an inappropriately increased rate, causing acetyl-CoA resulting from the beta-oxidation of fatty acids, to be converted into ketone bodies. The resulting very high levels of ketone bodies lower the pH of the blood plasma, which reflexively triggers the kidneys to excrete urine with very high acid levels. The high levels of glucose and ketones in the blood also spill passively into the urine (due to the inability of the renal tubules to reabsorb glucose and ketones from the tubular fluid, being overwhelmed by the high volumes of these substances being filtered into the tubular fluid). The resulting osmotic diuresis of glucose causes the removal of water and electrolytes from the blood resulting in potentially fatal dehydration.

Individuals who follow a low-carbohydrate diet will also develop ketosis. This induced ketosis is sometimes called nutritional ketosis, but the level of ketone body concentrations are on the order of 0.5–5 mM whereas the pathological ketoacidosis is 15–25 mM.

The process of ketosis has been studied for its effects in improving the cognitive symptoms of neurodegenerative diseases including Alzheimer's disease. Clinical trials have also looked to ketosis in children for Angelman syndrome.

== See also ==
- Fatty acid metabolism
