= HMG-CoA synthase, mitochondrial =

Enzyme found in humans

HMGCS2

Identifiers
- Aliases: HMGCS2, 3-hydroxy-3-methylglutaryl-CoA synthase 2
- External IDs: OMIM: 600234; MGI: 101939; GeneCards: HMGCS2
Available structures
PDB	Ortholog search: PDBe RCSB
PDB	List of PDB id codes 2WYA
Enzyme activity
EC #	BRENDA	ExPASy	KEGG	MetaCyc
2.3.3.10	↗	↗	↗	↗

Gene location (Human)
Chr.	Chromosome 1 (human)
Band	1p12	Start	119,748,002 bp
Band	1p12	End	119,768,905 bp

Gene location (Mouse)
Chr.	Chromosome 3 (mouse)
Band	3 F2.2|3 42.74 cM	Start	98,187,751 bp
Band	3 F2.2|3 42.74 cM	End	98,218,054 bp
RNA expression pattern
Bgee	Human / Mouse (ortholog); Top expressed in: right lobe of liver; mucosa of transverse colon; jejunal mucosa; rectum; mucosa of sigmoid colon; duodenum; renal medulla; human kidney; thoracic diaphragm; apex of heart / Top expressed in: left lobe of liver; lumbar spinal ganglion; Stroma of ovary; migratory enteric neural crest cell; retinal pigment epithelium; duodenum; gastrula; tunica media of zone of aorta; vestibular sensory epithelium; sexually immature organism; More reference expression data
BioGPS	n/a
Gene ontology
Molecular function	transferase activity; catalytic activity; hydroxymethylglutaryl-CoA synthase activity
Cellular component	mitochondrion; mitochondrial matrix
Biological process	steroid metabolic process; sterol biosynthetic process; lipid metabolism; cholesterol metabolic process; isoprenoid biosynthetic process; cholesterol biosynthetic process; metabolism; steroid biosynthetic process; ketone body biosynthetic process; regulation of lipid metabolic process; acetyl-CoA metabolic process; farnesyl diphosphate biosynthetic process, mevalonate pathway
Sources:Amigo / QuickGO
Orthologs
Databases	NCBI: entry; OMA: entry
Species	Human	Mouse
Entrez	3158	15360
Ensembl	ENSG00000134240	ENSMUSG00000027875
UniProt	P54868	P54869
RefSeq (mRNA)	NM_001166107; NM_005518	NM_008256
RefSeq (protein)	NP_001159579; NP_005509	NP_032282
Location (UCSC)	Chr 1: 119.75 – 119.77 Mb	Chr 3: 98.19 – 98.22 Mb
PubMed search
- Wikidata
View/Edit Human	View/Edit Mouse

HMG-CoA synthase, mitochondrial is an enzyme in humans that is encoded by the HMGCS2 gene.

The protein encoded by this gene belongs to the HMG-CoA synthase family. It is a mitochondrial enzyme that catalyzes the second and rate-limiting reaction of ketogenesis, a metabolic pathway that provides lipid-derived energy for various organs during times of carbohydrate deprivation, such as fasting, by addition of a third acetyl group to acetoacetyl-CoA, producing HMG-CoA.

Alternatively spliced transcript variants encoding different isoforms have been found for this gene.

== Clinical significance ==
Mutations in this gene are associated with mitochondrial HMG-CoA synthase deficiency (also known as HMGCS2D), affecting ketone body synthesis. Affected patients are unable to perform ketogenesis during starvation and times of higher energy need such as fever and vigorous exercise. Commonly found is damage to heart muscles and the brain, along with hypoglycemia (not always present) and elevated blood fatty acid concentration. The mortality rate is 20%. Urine organic acid analysis can be used to detect likely cases, which can be further confirmed using DNA sequencing.

== Occurrence ==
HMGCS2 deficiency is a rare disorder in humans, with fewer than 20 patients reported worldwide HMGCS2 is not found in cetaceans, elephantids, or Old World fruit bats. Fruit bats are known to be very sensitive to starvation, similar to humans with HMGCS2D. The other two groups seem to have evolved other means of coping with starvation.
