= Mevalonate pathway =

Series of interconnected biochemical reactions

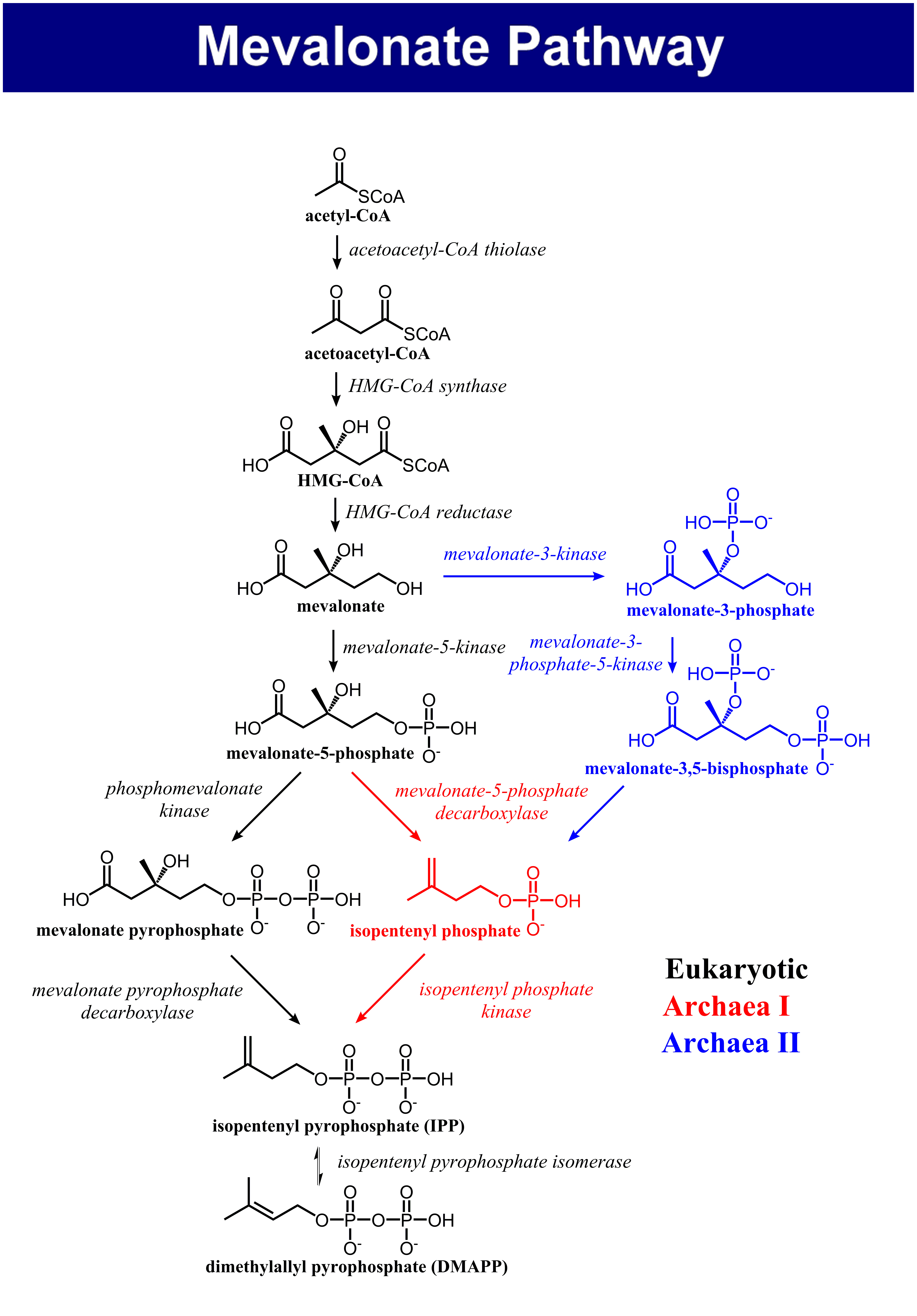
Mevalonate pathway diagram showing the conversion of acetyl-CoA into isopentenyl pyrophosphate, the essential building block of all isoprenoids. The eukaryotic variant is shown in black. Archaeal variants are shown in red and blue.

The mevalonate pathway, also known as the isoprenoid pathway or HMG-CoA reductase pathway, is an essential metabolic pathway present in eukaryotes, archaea, and some bacteria. The pathway produces two five-carbon building blocks called isopentenyl pyrophosphate (IPP) and dimethylallyl pyrophosphate (DMAPP), which are used to make isoprenoids, a diverse class of over 30,000 biomolecules such as cholesterol, vitamin K, coenzyme Q10, and all steroid hormones.

The mevalonate pathway begins with acetyl-CoA and ends with the production of IPP and DMAPP. It is best known as the target of statins, a class of cholesterol lowering drugs. Statins inhibit HMG-CoA reductase within the mevalonate pathway.

== Upper mevalonate pathway ==
The mevalonate pathway of eukaryotes, archaea, and eubacteria all begin the same way. The sole carbon feed stock of the pathway is acetyl-CoA. The first step condenses two acetyl-CoA molecules to yield acetoacetyl-CoA. This is followed by a second condensation to form HMG-CoA (3-hydroxy-3- methyl-glutaryl-CoA). Reduction of HMG-CoA yields (R)-mevalonate. These first 3 enzymatic steps are called the upper mevalonate pathway.

== Lower mevalonate pathway ==
The lower mevalonate pathway which converts (R)-mevalonate into IPP and DMAPP has 3 variants. In eukaryotes, mevalonate is phosphorylated twice in the 5-OH position, then decarboxylated to yield IPP. In some archaea such as Haloferax volcanii, mevalonate is phosphorylated once in the 5-OH position, decarboxylated to yield isopentenyl phosphate (IP), and finally phosphorylated again to yield IPP (Archaeal Mevalonate Pathway I). A third mevalonate pathway variant found in Thermoplasma acidophilum, phosphorylates mevalonate at the 3-OH position followed by phosphorylation at the 5-OH position. The resulting metabolite, mevalonate-3,5-bisphosphate, is decarboxylated to IP, and finally phosphorylated to yield IPP (Archaeal Mevalonate Pathway II).

== Regulation and feedback ==
Several key enzymes can be activated through DNA transcriptional regulation on activation of SREBP (sterol regulatory element-binding protein-1 and -2). This intracellular sensor detects low cholesterol levels and stimulates endogenous production by the HMG-CoA reductase pathway, as well as increasing lipoprotein uptake by up-regulating the LDL-receptor. Regulation of this pathway is also achieved by controlling the rate of translation of the mRNA, degradation of reductase and phosphorylation.

== Pharmacology ==
A number of drugs target the mevalonate pathway:

- Statins (used to decrease cholesterol levels);
- Bisphosphonates (used to treat various bone-degenerative diseases such as osteoporosis)

== Diseases ==
A number of diseases affect the mevalonate pathway:

- Mevalonate Kinase Deficiency
  - Mevalonic Aciduria
  - Hyperimmunoglobulinemia D Syndrome (HIDS).

== Alternative pathway ==
Plants, most bacteria, and some protozoa such as malaria parasites have the ability to produce isoprenoids using an alternative pathway called the methylerythritol phosphate (MEP) or non-mevalonate pathway. The output of both the mevalonate pathway and the MEP pathway are the same, IPP and DMAPP; however, the enzymatic reactions to convert acetyl-CoA into IPP are entirely different. Interaction between the two metabolic pathways can be studied by using ^{13}C-glucose isotopomers. In higher plants, the MEP pathway operates in plastids while the mevalonate pathway operates in the cytosol. Examples of bacteria that contain the MEP pathway include Escherichia coli and pathogens such as Mycobacterium tuberculosis.

== Enzymatic reactions ==
Enzyme	Reaction	Description
Acetoacetyl-CoA thiolase		Acetyl-CoA (citric acid cycle) undergoes condensation with another acetyl-CoA molecule to form acetoacetyl-CoA
HMG-CoA synthase		Acetoacetyl-CoA condenses with another Acetyl-CoA molecule to form 3-hydroxy-3-methylglutaryl-CoA (HMG-CoA).
HMG-CoA reductase		HMG-CoA is reduced to mevalonate by NADPH. This is the rate limiting step in cholesterol synthesis, which is why this enzyme is a good target for pharmaceuticals (statins).
mevalonate-5-kinase		Mevalonate is phosphorylated at the 5-OH position to yield mevalonate-5-phosphate (also called phosphomevalonic acid).
mevalonate-3-kinase		Mevalonate is phosphorylated at the 3-OH position to yield mevalonate-3-phosphate. 1 ATP is consumed.
mevalonate-3-phosphate-5-kinase		Mevalonate-3-phosphate is phosphorylated at the 5-OH position to yield mevalonate-5-phosphate (also called phosphomevalonic acid). 1 ATP is consumed.
phosphomevalonate kinase		mevalonate-5-phosphate is phosphorylated to yield mevalonate-5-pyrophosphate. 1 ATP is consumed.
mevalonate-5-pyrophosphate decarboxylase		Mevalonate-5-pyrophosphate is decarboxylated to yield isopentenyl pyrophosphate (IPP). 1 ATP is consumed.
isopentenyl pyrophosphate isomerase		isopentenyl pyrophosphate is isomerized to dimethylallyl pyrophosphate.
