= Acetoacetic acid =

Organic compound

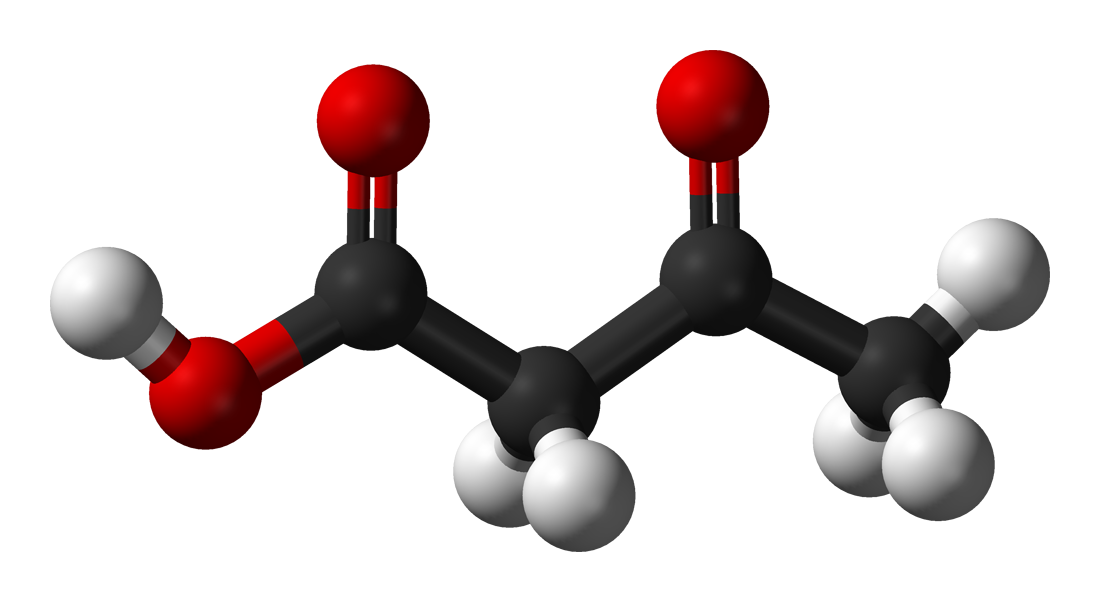

Names
- Preferred IUPAC name 3-Oxobutanoic acid
- Systematic IUPAC name 3-Oxobutyric acid
- Other names Acetoacetic acid Diacetic acid Acetylacetic acid Acetonecarboxylic acid

Identifiers
CAS Number	541-50-4
3D model (JSmol)	Interactive image
ChEBI	CHEBI:15344
ChEMBL	ChEMBL1230762
ChemSpider	94
DrugBank	DB01762
KEGG	C00164
PubChem CID	96
UNII	4ZI204Y1MC
CompTox Dashboard (EPA)	DTXSID00202441
- InChI: InChI=1S/C4H6O3/c1-3(5)2-4(6)7/h2H2,1H3,(H,6,7) Key: WDJHALXBUFZDSR-UHFFFAOYSA-N; InChI=1/C4H6O3/c1-3(5)2-4(6)7/h2H2,1H3,(H,6,7) Key: WDJHALXBUFZDSR-UHFFFAOYAH
- SMILES: O=C(C)CC(=O)O

Properties
Chemical formula	C_{4}H_{6}O_{3}
Molar mass	102.089 g·mol^{−1}
Appearance	Colorless, oily liquid
Melting point	36.5 °C (97.7 °F; 309.6 K)
Boiling point	Decomposes
Solubility in water	Soluble
Solubility in organic solvents	Soluble in ethanol, ether
Acidity (pK_{a})	3.58
- Except where otherwise noted, data are given for materials in their standard state (at 25 °C [77 °F], 100 kPa). verify (what is ?) Infobox references

Acetoacetic acid (IUPAC name: 3-oxobutanoic acid, also known as acetonecarboxylic acid or diacetic acid) is the organic compound with the formula CH_{3}COCH_{2}COOH. It is the simplest beta-keto acid, and like other members of this class, it is unstable. The methyl and ethyl esters, which are quite stable, are produced on a large scale industrially as precursors to dyes. Acetoacetic acid is a weak acid.

== Biochemistry ==
Under typical physiological conditions, acetoacetic acid exists as its conjugate base, acetoacetate:

AcCH_{2}CO_{2}H → AcCH_{2}CO^{−}_{2} + H^{+}

Unbound acetoacetate is primarily produced by liver mitochondria from its thioester with coenzyme A (CoA):

AcCH_{2}C(O)−CoA + OH^{−} → AcCH_{2}CO^{−}_{2} + H−CoA

The acetoacetyl-CoA itself is formed by three routes:

- 3-hydroxy-3-methylglutaryl CoA releases acetyl CoA and acetoacetate:
  ^{−}O_{2}CCH_{2}−C(Me)(OH)−CH_{2}C(O)−CoA → ^{−}O_{2}CCH_{2}−Ac + Ac−CoA
- Acetoacetyl-CoA can come from beta oxidation of butyryl-CoA:
  Et−CH_{2}C(O)−CoA + 2NAD^{+} + H_{2}O + FAD → Ac−CH_{2}C(O)−CoA + 2NADH + FADH_{2}
- Condensation of pair of acetyl CoA molecules as catalyzed by thiolase.
  2Ac−CoA → AcCH_{2}C(O)−CoA + H−CoA

In mammals, acetoacetate produced in the liver (along with the other two "ketone bodies") is released into the bloodstream as an energy source during periods of fasting, exercise, or as a result of type 1 diabetes mellitus. First, a CoA group is enzymatically transferred to it from succinyl CoA, converting it back to acetoacetyl CoA; this is then broken into two acetyl CoA molecules by thiolase, and these then enter the citric acid cycle. Heart muscle and renal cortex prefer acetoacetate over glucose. The brain uses acetoacetate when glucose levels are low due to fasting or diabetes.

== Synthesis and properties ==
Acetoacetic acid may be prepared by the hydrolysis of diketene. Its esters are produced analogously via reactions between diketene and alcohols, and acetoacetic acid can be prepared by the hydrolysis of these species. In general, acetoacetic acid is generated at 0 °C and used in situ immediately.

It decomposes at a moderate reaction rate into acetone and carbon dioxide:

CH_{3}C(O)CH_{2}CO_{2}H → CH_{3}C(O)CH_{3} + CO_{2}

The acid form has a half-life of 140 minutes at 37 °C in water, whereas the basic form (the anion) has a half-life of 130 hours. That is, it reacts about 55 times more slowly. The corresponding decarboxylation of trifluoroacetoacetate is used to prepare trifluoroacetone:

CF_{3}C(O)CH_{2}CO_{2}H → CF_{3}C(O)CH_{3} + CO_{2}

It is a weak acid (like most alkyl carboxylic acids), with a pK_{a} of 3.58.

Acetoacetic acid displays keto-enol tautomerisation, with the enol form being partially stabilised by extended conjugation and intramolecular H-bonding. The equilibrium is strongly solvent dependent; with the keto form dominating in polar solvents (98% in water) and the enol form accounting for 25-49% of material in non-polar solvents.

== Detection ==
Acetoacetic acid is measured in the urine of people with diabetes to test for ketoacidosis and for monitoring people on a ketogenic or low-carbohydrate diet. This is done using dipsticks coated in nitroprusside or similar reagents. Nitroprusside changes from pink to purple in the presence of acetoacetate, the conjugate base of acetoacetic acid, and the colour change is graded by eye. The test does not measure β-hydroxybutyrate, the most abundant ketone in the body; during treatment of ketoacidosis β-hydroxybutyrate is converted to acetoacetate so the test is not useful after treatment begins and may be falsely low at diagnosis.

Similar tests are used in dairy cows to test for ketosis.

== See also ==
- 3-Hydroxybutyrate dehydrogenase
- Ethyl acetoacetate
