= Ketogenesis =

Chemical synthesis of ketone bodies

Ketogenesis pathway. The three ketone bodies (acetoacetate, acetone, and beta-hydroxy-butyrate) are marked within orange boxes

Ketogenesis is the biochemical process through which organisms produce ketone bodies by breaking down fatty acids and ketogenic amino acids. The process supplies energy to certain organs, particularly the brain, heart and skeletal muscle, under specific scenarios including fasting, caloric restriction, sleep, or others. (In rare metabolic diseases, insufficient gluconeogenesis can cause excessive ketogenesis and hypoglycemia, which may lead to the life-threatening condition known as non-diabetic ketoacidosis.)

== Production ==
Ketone bodies are produced mainly in the mitochondria of liver cells, and synthesis can occur in response to an unavailability of blood glucose, such as during fasting. Other cells, e.g. human astrocytes, are capable of carrying out ketogenesis, but they are not as effective at doing so. Ketogenesis occurs constantly in a healthy individual. Ketogenesis in healthy individuals is ultimately under the control of the master regulatory protein AMPK, which is activated during times of metabolic stress, such as carbohydrate insufficiency. Its activation in the liver inhibits lipogenesis, promotes fatty acid oxidation, switches off acetyl-CoA carboxylase, turns on malonyl-CoA decarboxylase, and consequently induces ketogenesis. Ethanol is a potent AMPK inhibitor and therefore can cause significant disruptions in the metabolic state of the liver, including halting of ketogenesis, even in the context of hypoglycemia.

Ketogenesis takes place in the setting of low glucose levels in the blood, after exhaustion of other cellular carbohydrate stores, such as glycogen. It can also take place when there is insufficient insulin (e.g. in type 1 (and less commonly type 2) diabetes), particularly during periods of "ketogenic stress" such as intercurrent illness.

The production of ketone bodies is then initiated to make available energy that is stored as fatty acids. Fatty acids are enzymatically broken down in β-oxidation to form acetyl-CoA. Under normal conditions, acetyl-CoA is further oxidized by the citric acid cycle (TCA/Krebs cycle) and then by the mitochondrial electron transport chain to release energy. However, if the amounts of acetyl-CoA generated in fatty-acid β-oxidation challenge the processing capacity of the TCA cycle; i.e. if activity in TCA cycle is low due to low amounts of intermediates such as oxaloacetate, acetyl-CoA is then used instead in biosynthesis of ketone bodies via acetoacetyl-CoA and β-hydroxy-β-methylglutaryl-CoA (HMG-CoA). Furthermore, since there is only a limited amount of coenzyme A in the liver, the production of ketone bodies allows some of the coenzyme to be freed to continue fatty-acid β-oxidation. Depletion of glucose and oxaloacetate can be triggered by fasting, vigorous exercise, high-fat diets or other medical conditions, all of which enhance ketone production. Deaminated amino acids that are ketogenic, such as leucine, also feed TCA cycle, forming acetoacetate & ACoA and thereby produce ketones. Besides its role in the synthesis of ketone bodies, HMG-CoA is also an intermediate in the synthesis of cholesterol, but the steps are compartmentalised. Ketogenesis occurs in the mitochondria, whereas cholesterol synthesis occurs in the cytosol, hence both processes are independently regulated.

== Ketone bodies ==
The three ketone bodies, each synthesized from acetyl-CoA molecules, are:

- Acetoacetate, which can be converted by the liver into β-hydroxybutyrate, or spontaneously turn into acetone. Most acetoacetate is reduced to beta-hydroxybutyrate, which serves to additionally ferry reducing electrons to the tissues, especially the brain, where they are stripped back off and used for metabolism.
- Acetone, which is generated through the decarboxylation of acetoacetate, either spontaneously or through the enzyme acetoacetate decarboxylase. It can then be further metabolized either by CYP2E1 into hydroxyacetone (acetol) and then via propylene glycol to pyruvate, lactate and acetate (usable for energy) and propionaldehyde, or via methylglyoxal to pyruvate and lactate.
- β-hydroxybutyrate (not technically a ketone according to IUPAC nomenclature) is generated through the action of the enzyme D-β-hydroxybutyrate dehydrogenase on acetoacetate. Upon entering the tissues, beta-hydroxybutyrate is converted by D-β-hydroxybutyrate dehydrogenase back to acetoacetate along with a proton and a molecule of NADH, the latter of which goes on to power the electron transport chain and other redox reactions. β-Hydroxybutyrate is the most abundant of the ketone bodies, followed by acetoacetate and finally acetone.

β-Hydroxybutyrate and acetoacetate can pass through membranes easily, and are therefore a source of energy for the brain, which cannot directly metabolize fatty acids. The brain receives 60-70% of its required energy from ketone bodies when blood glucose levels are low. These bodies are transported into the brain by monocarboxylate transporters 1 and 2. Therefore, ketone bodies are a way to move energy from the liver to other cells. The liver does not have the critical enzyme, succinyl CoA transferase, to process ketone bodies, and therefore cannot undergo ketolysis. The result is that the liver only produces ketone bodies, but does not use a significant amount of them.

== Regulation ==
Ketogenesis may or may not occur, depending on levels of available carbohydrates in the cell or body. This is closely related to the paths of acetyl-CoA:

- When the body has ample carbohydrates available as energy source, glucose is completely oxidized to CO_{2}; acetyl-CoA is formed as an intermediate in this process, first entering the citric acid cycle followed by complete conversion of its chemical energy to ATP in oxidative phosphorylation.
- When the body has excess carbohydrates available, some glucose is fully metabolized, and some of it is stored in the form of glycogen or, upon citrate excess, as fatty acids (see lipogenesis). Coenzyme A is recycled at this step.
- When the body has no free carbohydrates available, fat must be broken down into acetyl-CoA in order to get energy. Under these conditions, acetyl-CoA cannot be metabolized through the citric acid cycle because the citric acid cycle intermediates (mainly oxaloacetate) have been depleted to feed the gluconeogenesis pathway. The resulting accumulation of acetyl-CoA activates ketogenesis.

Insulin and glucagon are key regulating hormones of ketogenesis, with insulin being the primary regulator. Both hormones regulate hormone-sensitive lipase and acetyl-CoA carboxylase. Hormone-sensitive lipase produces diglycerides from triglycerides, freeing a fatty acid molecule for oxidation. Acetyl-CoA carboxylase catalyzes the production of malonyl-CoA from acetyl-CoA. Malonyl-CoA reduces the activity of carnitine palmitoyltransferase I, an enzyme that brings fatty acids into the mitochondria for β-oxidation. Insulin inhibits hormone-sensitive lipase and activates acetyl-CoA carboxylase, thereby reducing the amount of starting materials for fatty acid oxidation and inhibiting their capacity to enter the mitochondria. Glucagon activates hormone-sensitive lipase and inhibits acetyl-CoA carboxylase, thereby stimulating ketone body production, and making passage into the mitochondria for β-oxidation easier. Insulin also inhibits HMG-CoA lyase, further inhibiting ketone body production. Similarly, cortisol, catecholamines, epinephrine, norepinephrine, and thyroid hormones can increase the amount of ketone bodies produced, by activating lipolysis (the mobilization of fatty acids out of fat tissue) and thereby increasing the concentration of fatty acids available for β-oxidation. Unlike glucagon, catecholamines are capable of inducing lipolysis even in the presence of insulin for use by peripheral tissues during acute stress.

Peroxisome Proliferator Activated Receptor alpha (PPARα) also has the ability to upregulate ketogenesis, as it has some control over a number of genes involved in ketogenesis. For example, monocarboxylate transporter 1, which is involved in transporting ketone bodies over membranes (including the blood–brain barrier), is regulated by PPARα, thus affecting ketone body transportation into the brain. Carnitine palmitoyltransferase is also upregulated by PPARα, which can affect fatty acid transportation into the mitochondria.

== Pathology ==
Both acetoacetate and beta-hydroxybutyrate are acidic, and, if levels of these ketone bodies are too high, the pH of the blood drops, resulting in ketoacidosis. Ketoacidosis is known to occur in untreated type I diabetes (see diabetic ketoacidosis) and in alcoholics after prolonged binge-drinking without intake of sufficient carbohydrates (see alcoholic ketoacidosis).

The production and use of ketones can be ineffective in people with defects in the pathway for beta-oxidation, in the genes for ketogenesis (HMGCS2 and HMGCL), or for ketolysis (OXCT1 and ACAT1). Defects in this pathway can cause varying degrees of inability to cope with fasting. HMGCS2 deficiency, for example, can cause hypoglycemic crises that lead to brain damage, and death.

Individuals with diabetes mellitus can experience overproduction of ketone bodies due to a lack of insulin. Without insulin to help extract glucose from the blood, the levels of malonyl-CoA are reduced, and it becomes easier for fatty acids to be transported into mitochondria, causing the accumulation of excess acetyl-CoA. The accumulation of acetyl-CoA in turn produces excess ketone bodies through ketogenesis. The result is a rate of ketone production higher than the rate of ketone disposal, and a decrease in blood pH. In extreme cases the resulting acetone can be detected in the patient's breath as a faint, sweet odor.

There are some health benefits to ketone bodies and ketogenesis as well. It has been suggested that a low-carb, high fat ketogenic diet can be used to help treat epilepsy in children. Additionally, ketone bodies can be anti-inflammatory. Some kinds of cancer cells are unable to use ketone bodies, as they do not have the necessary enzymes to engage in ketolysis. It has been proposed that actively engaging in behaviors that promote ketogenesis could help manage the effects of some cancers.

== See also ==
- Ketone bodies
- Fatty acid metabolism
- Ketosis
- Ketogenic diet
