= Acetyl-CoA =

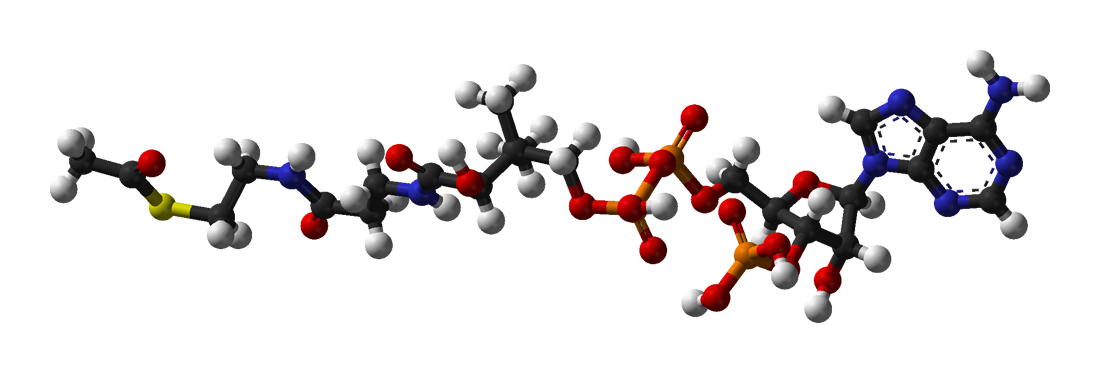

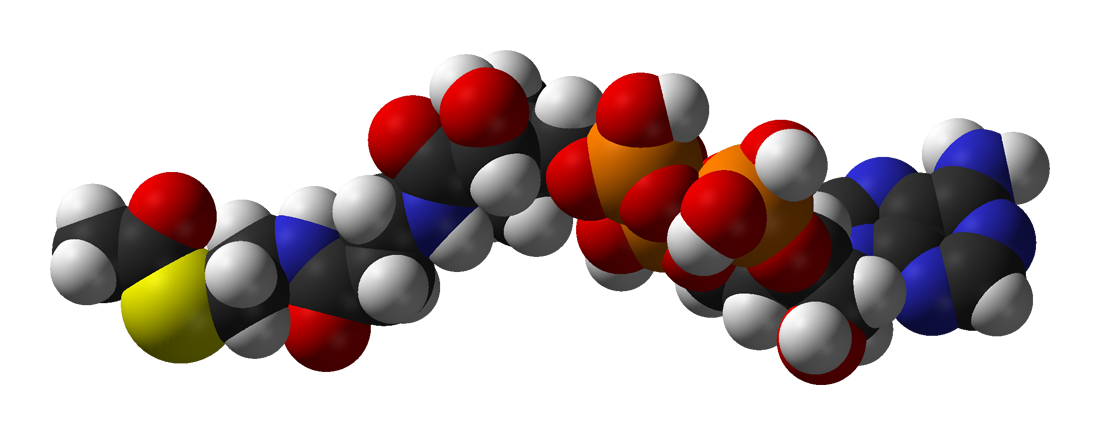

Names
- Preferred IUPAC name O^{1}-{(3R)-4-[(3-{[2-(Acetylsulfanyl)ethyl]amino}-3-oxopropyl)amino]-3-hydroxy-2,2-dimethyl-4-oxobutyl} O^{3}-{[(2R,3S,4R,5R)-5-(6-amino-9H-purin-9-yl)-4-hydroxy-3-(phosphonooxy)oxolan-2-yl]methyl} dihydrogen diphosphate

Identifiers
CAS Number	72-89-9 (free acid)
3D model (JSmol)	Interactive image; Interactive image
ChEBI	CHEBI:15351
ChemSpider	392413
ECHA InfoCard	100.000.719
IUPHAR/BPS	3038
KEGG	C00024
MeSH	Acetyl+Coenzyme+A
PubChem CID	444493
UNII	76Q83YLO3O
CompTox Dashboard (EPA)	DTXSID30992686
- InChI: InChI=1S/C23H38N7O17P3S/c1-12(31)51-7-6-25-14(32)4-5-26-21(35)18(34)23(2,3)9-44-50(41,42)47-49(39,40)43-8-13-17(46-48(36,37)38)16(33)22(45-13)30-11-29-15-19(24)27-10-28-20(15)30/h10-11,13,16-18,22,33-34H,4-9H2,1-3H3,(H,25,32)(H,26,35)(H,39,40)(H,41,42)(H2,24,27,28)(H2,36,37,38)/t13-,16-,17-,18+,22-/m1/s1 Key: ZSLZBFCDCINBPY-ZSJPKINUSA-N; InChI=1/C23H38N7O17P3S/c1-12(31)51-7-6-25-14(32)4-5-26-21(35)18(34)23(2,3)9-44-50(41,42)47-49(39,40)43-8-13-17(46-48(36,37)38)16(33)22(45-13)30-11-29-15-19(24)27-10-28-20(15)30/h10-11,13,16-18,22,33-34H,4-9H2,1-3H3,(H,25,32)(H,26,35)(H,39,40)(H,41,42)(H2,24,27,28)(H2,36,37,38)/t13-,16-,17-,18+,22-/m1/s1 Key: ZSLZBFCDCINBPY-ZSJPKINUBJ
- SMILES: O=C(SCCNC(=O)CCNC(=O)[C@H](O)C(C)(C)COP(=O)(O)OP(=O)(O)OC[C@H]3O[C@@H](n2cnc1c(ncnc12)N)[C@H](O)[C@@H]3OP(=O)(O)O)C; CC(=O)SCCNC(=O)CCNC(=O)[C@@H](C(C)(C)COP(=O)(O)OP(=O)(O)OC[C@@H]1[C@H]([C@H]([C@@H](O1)n2cnc3c2ncnc3N)O)OP(=O)(O)O)O

Properties
Chemical formula	C_{23}H_{38}N_{7}O_{17}P_{3}S
Molar mass	809.57 g·mol^{−1}
UV-vis (λ_{max})	260 nm; 232 nm
Absorbance	ε_{260} = 16.4 mM^{−1} cm^{−1} (adenosine) ε_{232} = 8.7 mM^{−1} cm^{−1} (thioester); Δε_{232} on thioester hydrolysis = −4.5 mM^{−1} cm^{−1}
- Except where otherwise noted, data are given for materials in their standard state (at 25 °C [77 °F], 100 kPa). verify (what is ?) Infobox references

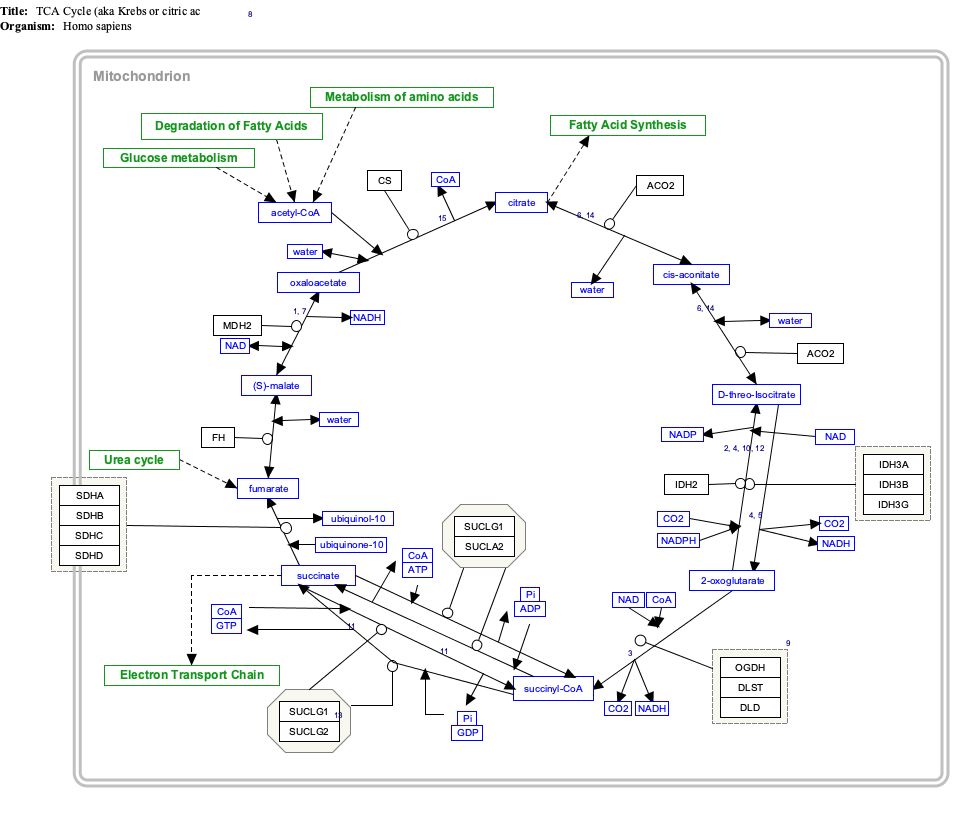

TCACycle_WP78 edit
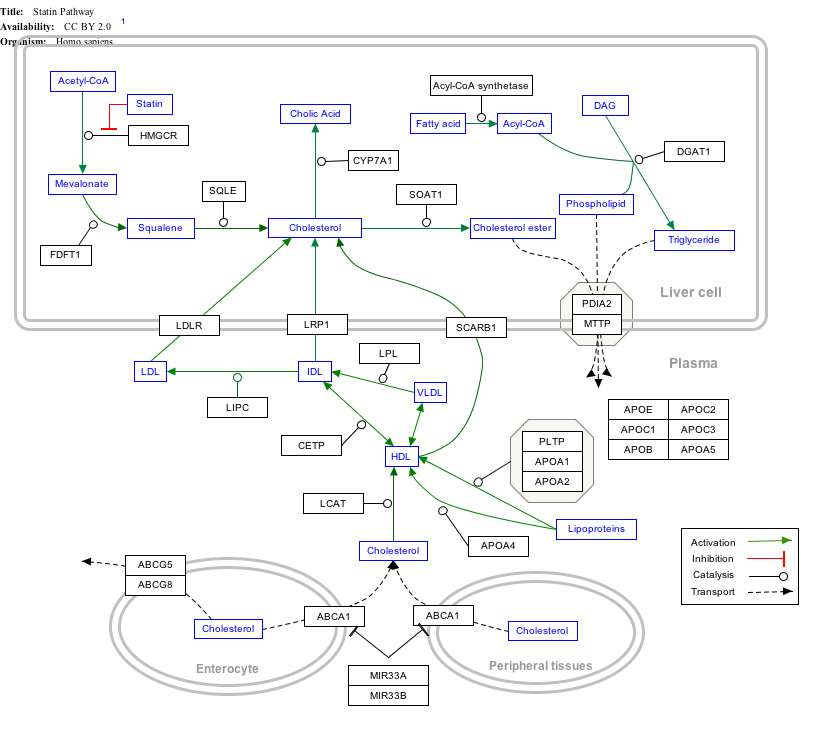

Statin pathway edit

Acetyl-CoA (acetyl coenzyme A) is a molecule that participates in many biochemical reactions in protein, carbohydrate and lipid metabolism. Its main function is to deliver the acetyl group to the citric acid cycle (Krebs cycle) to be oxidized for energy production.

Coenzyme A (CoASH or CoA) consists of a β-mercaptoethylamine group linked to pantothenic acid (vitamin B5) through an amide linkage and 3', 5'-phosphorylated ADP. The acetyl group (indicated in blue in the structural diagram on the right) of acetyl-CoA is linked to the sulfhydryl substituent of the β-mercaptoethylamine group. This thioester linkage is a "high energy" bond, which is particularly reactive. Hydrolysis of the thioester bond is exergonic (−31.5 kJ/mol).

CoA is acetylated to acetyl-CoA by the breakdown of carbohydrates through glycolysis and by the breakdown of fatty acids through β-oxidation. Acetyl-CoA then enters the citric acid cycle, where the acetyl group is oxidized to carbon dioxide and water, and the energy released is captured in the form of 11 ATP and one GTP per acetyl group.

Konrad Bloch and Feodor Lynen were awarded the 1964 Nobel Prize in Physiology or Medicine for their discoveries linking acetyl-CoA and fatty acid metabolism. Fritz Lipmann won the Nobel Prize in 1953 for his discovery of the cofactor coenzyme A.

== Role ==
Acetyl-CoA is a metabolic intermediate that is involved in many metabolic pathways in an organism. It is produced during the breakdown of glucose, fatty acids, and amino acids, and is used in the synthesis of many other biomolecules, including cholesterol, fatty acids, and ketone bodies. Acetyl-CoA is also a key molecule in the citric acid cycle, which is a series of chemical reactions that occur in the mitochondria of cells and is responsible for generating energy in the form of ATP.

In addition, acetyl-CoA is a precursor for the biosynthesis of various acetyl-chemicals, acting as an intermediate to transfer an acetyl group during the biosynthesis of those acetyl-chemicals. Acetyl-CoA is also involved in the regulation of various cellular mechanisms by providing acetyl groups to target amino acid residues for post-translational acetylation reactions of proteins.

== Biosynthesis ==
The acetylation of CoA is determined by the carbon sources.

=== Extramitochondrial ===
At high glucose levels, glycolysis takes place rapidly, thus increasing the amount of citrate produced from the citric acid cycle. This citrate is then exported to other organelles outside the mitochondria to be broken into acetyl-CoA and oxaloacetate by the enzyme ATP citrate lyase (ACL). This principal reaction is coupled with the hydrolysis of ATP.

At low glucose levels CoA is acetylated using acetate by acetyl-CoA synthetase (ACS), also coupled with ATP hydrolysis. Ethanol also serves as a carbon source for acetylation of CoA utilizing the enzyme alcohol dehydrogenase. Degradation of branched-chain ketogenic amino acids such as valine, leucine, and isoleucine occurs. These amino acids are converted to α-ketoacids by transamination and eventually to isovaleryl-CoA through oxidative decarboxylation by an α-ketoacid dehydrogenase complex. Isovaleryl-CoA undergoes dehydrogenation, carboxylation and hydration to form another CoA-derivative intermediate before it is cleaved into acetyl-CoA and acetoacetate.

Additionally, malonyl-CoA decarboxylase (MCD), present in the cytosol, contributes to the extramitochondrial acetyl-CoA pool by converting malonyl-CoA into acetyl-CoA.

=== Intramitochondrial ===
Pyruvate dehydrogenase complex reaction

At high glucose levels, acetyl-CoA is produced through glycolysis. Pyruvate undergoes oxidative decarboxylation in which it loses its carboxyl group (as carbon dioxide) to form acetyl-CoA, giving off 33.5 kJ/mol of energy. The oxidative conversion of pyruvate into acetyl-CoA is referred to as the pyruvate dehydrogenase reaction. It is catalyzed by the pyruvate dehydrogenase complex. Other conversions between pyruvate and acetyl-CoA are possible. For example, pyruvate formate lyase disproportionates pyruvate into acetyl-CoA and formic acid.

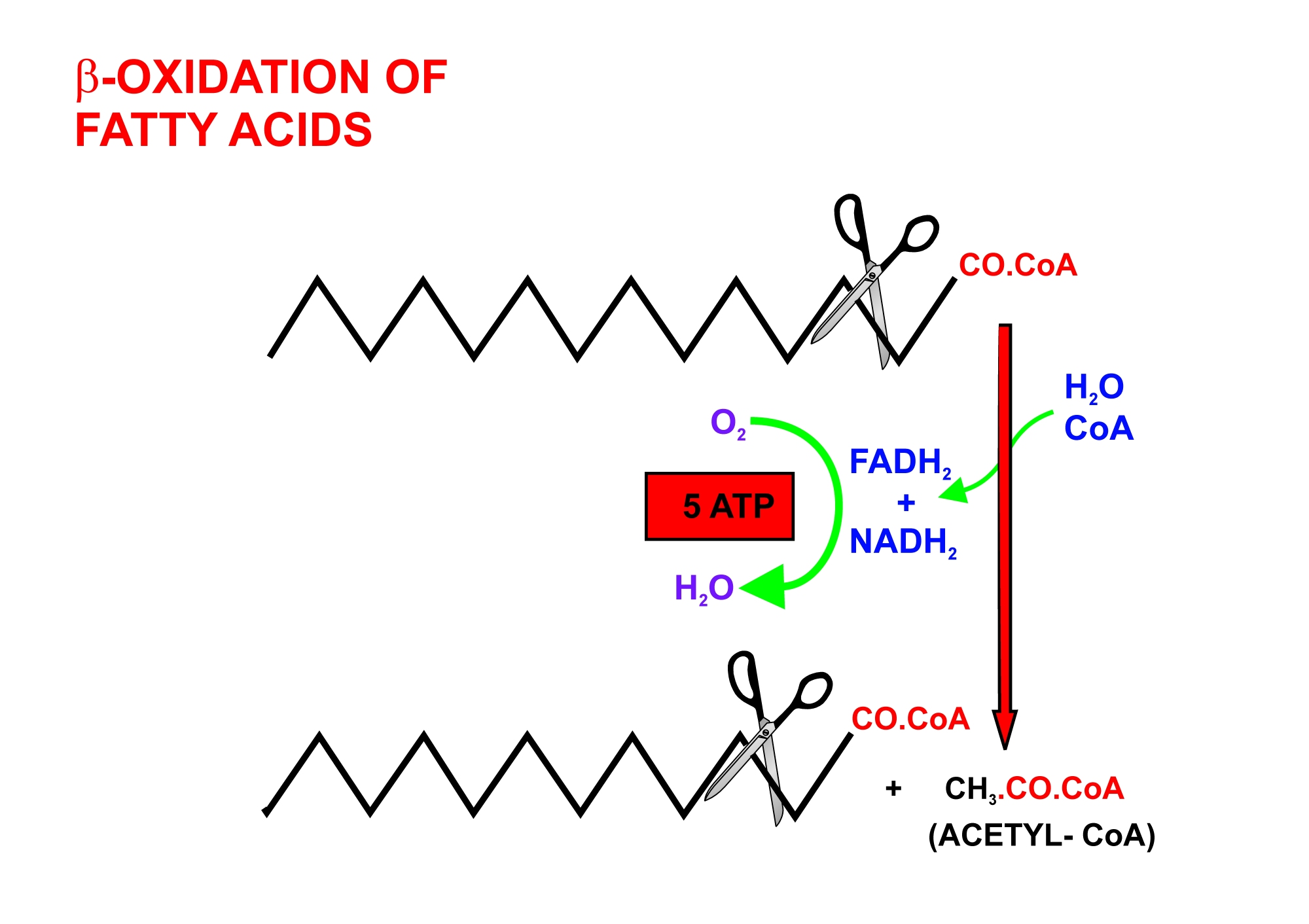
β-Oxidation of fatty acids

At low glucose levels, the production of acetyl-CoA is linked to β-oxidation of fatty acids. Fatty acids are first converted to acyl-CoA. Acyl-CoA is then degraded in a four-step cycle of oxidation, hydration, oxidation and thiolysis catalyzed by four respective enzymes, namely acyl-CoA dehydrogenase, enoyl-CoA hydratase, 3-hydroxyacyl-CoA dehydrogenase, and thiolase. The cycle produces a new fatty acid chain with two fewer carbons and acetyl-CoA as a byproduct.

Within mitochondria, MCD similarly facilitates acetyl-CoA production by decarboxylating malonyl-CoA, thereby supporting metabolic flexibility during low-glucose states.

== Functions ==
=== Intermediates in various pathways ===
==== Citric Acid Cycle ====
In cellular respiration, acetyl-CoA is used in the Citric acid cycle, where, through a series of chemical reactions, stored energy is released through the oxidation of acetyl-CoA derived from carbohydrates, fats, and proteins into adenosine triphosphate (ATP) and carbon dioxide.

==== β-oxidation ====
In β-oxidation, acetyl-CoA is produced by the breakdown of both carbohydrates (by glycolysis) and lipids (by β-oxidation). It then enters the citric acid cycle in the mitochondrion by combining with oxaloacetate to form citrate.

==== Cytosolic fatty acid synthesis (FAS) ====
When the insulin concentration in the blood is high, and that of glucagon is low (i.e. after meals), the acetyl-CoA produced by glycolysis condenses as normal with oxaloacetate to form citrate in the mitochondrion. However, instead of continuing through the citric acid cycle to be converted to carbon dioxide and water, the citrate is removed from the mitochondrion into the cytoplasm. There it is cleaved by ATP citrate lyase into acetyl-CoA and oxaloacetate. The oxaloacetate is returned to the mitochondrion as malate (and then converted back into oxaloacetate to transfer more acetyl-CoA out of the mitochondrion). This cytosolic acetyl-CoA can then be used to synthesize fatty acids through carboxylation by acetyl-CoA carboxylase into malonyl CoA, the first committed step in the synthesis of fatty acids. This conversion occurs primarily in the liver, adipose tissue and lactating mammary glands, where the fatty acids are combined with glycerol to form triglycerides, the major fuel reservoir of most animals. Fatty acids are also components of the phospholipids that make up the bulk of the lipid bilayers of all cellular membranes.

In plants, de novo fatty acid synthesis occurs in the plastids. Many seeds accumulate large reservoirs of seed oils to support germination and early growth of the seedling before it is a net photosynthetic organism.

==== Mitochondrial fatty acid synthesis (mtFAS) ====
Mitochondrial acetyl-CoA is converted to malonyl-CoA by the mitochondrial isoform of acetyl-CoA carboxylase 1 (mtACC1), in tandem with acyl-CoA synthetase family member 3 (ACSF3), which additionally generates malonyl-CoA from malonate, together providing the extender units for mitochondrial fatty acid synthesis (mtFAS). In response to mitochondrial acetyl-CoA availability, mitochondrial fatty acid synthesis (mtFAS) builds acyl chains on the matrix-soluble acyl carrier protein (holo-ACP), producing acyl-ACP species with varying chain lengths. These acyl-ACP species are required for the biosynthesis of lipoic acid—a cofactor of key mitochondrial enzyme complexes such as the pyruvate dehydrogenase complex (PDC), the 2-oxoglutarate dehydrogenase complex (OGDC), the 2-oxoadipate dehydrogenase complex (OADHC), the branched-chain α-keto acid dehydrogenase complex (BCKDHC), and the glycine cleavage system—as well as for the allosteric activation of the LYRM protein network. Members of this network regulate iron–sulfur cluster biogenesis, assembly of the electron transport chain complexes, and mitochondrial translation, which remains active even under conditions of limited acetyl-CoA availability. In summary, acetyl-CoA controls its own mitochondrial consumption via mtFAS and acylated ACP, enhancing oxidative capacity in times of substrate excess and downregulating electron transport chain activity under substrate-limited conditions to prevent reactive oxygen species (ROS) generation.

==== Ketone body formation and utilization ====
Two acetyl-CoA molecules condense to form acetoacetyl-CoA, which gives rise to the formation of acetoacetate and β-hydroxybutyrate. Acetoacetate, β-hydroxybutyrate, and their spontaneous breakdown product acetone are frequently, but confusingly, known as ketone bodies (as they are not "bodies" at all, but water-soluble chemical substances). The ketone bodies are released by the liver into the blood. All cells with mitochondria can take ketone bodies up from the blood and reconvert them into acetyl-CoA, which can then be used as fuel in their citric acid cycles, as no other tissue can divert its oxaloacetate into the gluconeogenic pathway in the way that the liver does. Unlike free fatty acids, ketone bodies can cross the blood–brain barrier and are therefore available as fuel for the cells of the central nervous system, acting as a substitute for glucose, on which these cells normally survive. The occurrence of high levels of ketone bodies in the blood during starvation, a low-carbohydrate diet, prolonged heavy exercise, and uncontrolled type-1 diabetes mellitus is known as ketosis, and in its extreme form in out-of-control type-1 diabetes mellitus, as ketoacidosis.

==== Cholesterol synthesis ====
The cytosolic acetyl-CoA can also condense with acetoacetyl-CoA to form 3-hydroxy-3-methylglutaryl-CoA (HMG-CoA) which is the rate-limiting step controlling the synthesis of cholesterol. Cholesterol can be used as is, as a structural component of cellular membranes, or it can be used to synthesize steroid hormones, bile salts, and vitamin D.

==== Other biosynthetic roles ====
Acetyl-CoA can be carboxylated in the cytosol by acetyl-CoA carboxylase, giving rise to malonyl-CoA, a substrate required for synthesis of flavonoids and related polyketides, for elongation of fatty acids to produce waxes, cuticle, and seed oils in members of the Brassica family, and for malonation of proteins and other phytochemicals. In plants, these include sesquiterpenes, brassinosteroids (hormones), and membrane sterols.

==== Steroid synthesis ====
Acetyl-CoA participates in the mevalonate pathway by partaking in the synthesis of hydroxymethyl glutaryl-CoA.

==== Acetylcholine synthesis ====
Acetyl-CoA is also an important component in the biogenic synthesis of the neurotransmitter acetylcholine. Choline, in combination with acetyl-CoA, is catalyzed by the enzyme choline acetyltransferase to produce acetylcholine and coenzyme A as a byproduct.

==== Acetylation ====
Acetyl-CoA is also the source of the acetyl group incorporated onto certain lysine residues of histone and nonhistone proteins in the posttranslational modification acetylation. This acetylation is catalyzed by acetyltransferases. This acetylation affects cell growth, mitosis, and apoptosis.

==== Allosteric regulator ====
Acetyl-CoA serves as an allosteric regulator of pyruvate dehydrogenase kinase (PDK). It regulates through the ratio of acetyl-CoA versus CoA. Increased concentration of acetyl-CoA activates PDK.

Acetyl-CoA is also an allosteric activator of pyruvate carboxylase.

== See also ==
- Malonyl-CoA decarboxylase
