= Mevalonic acid =

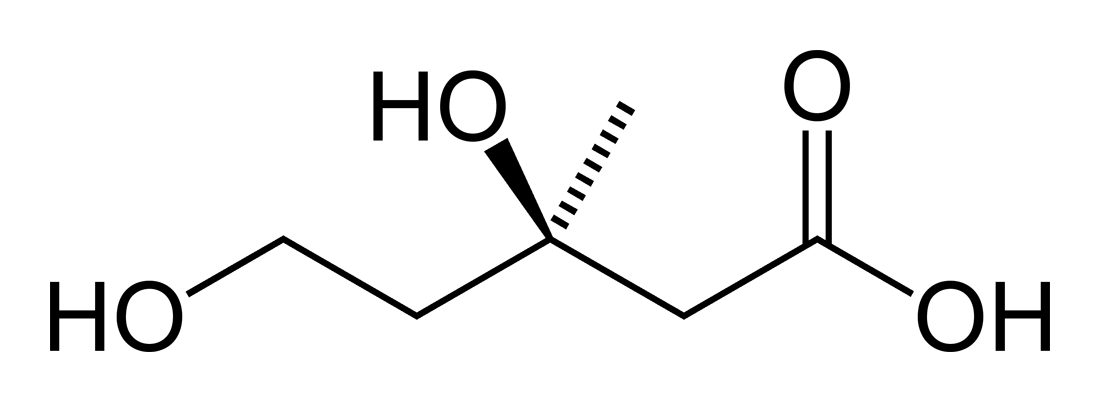

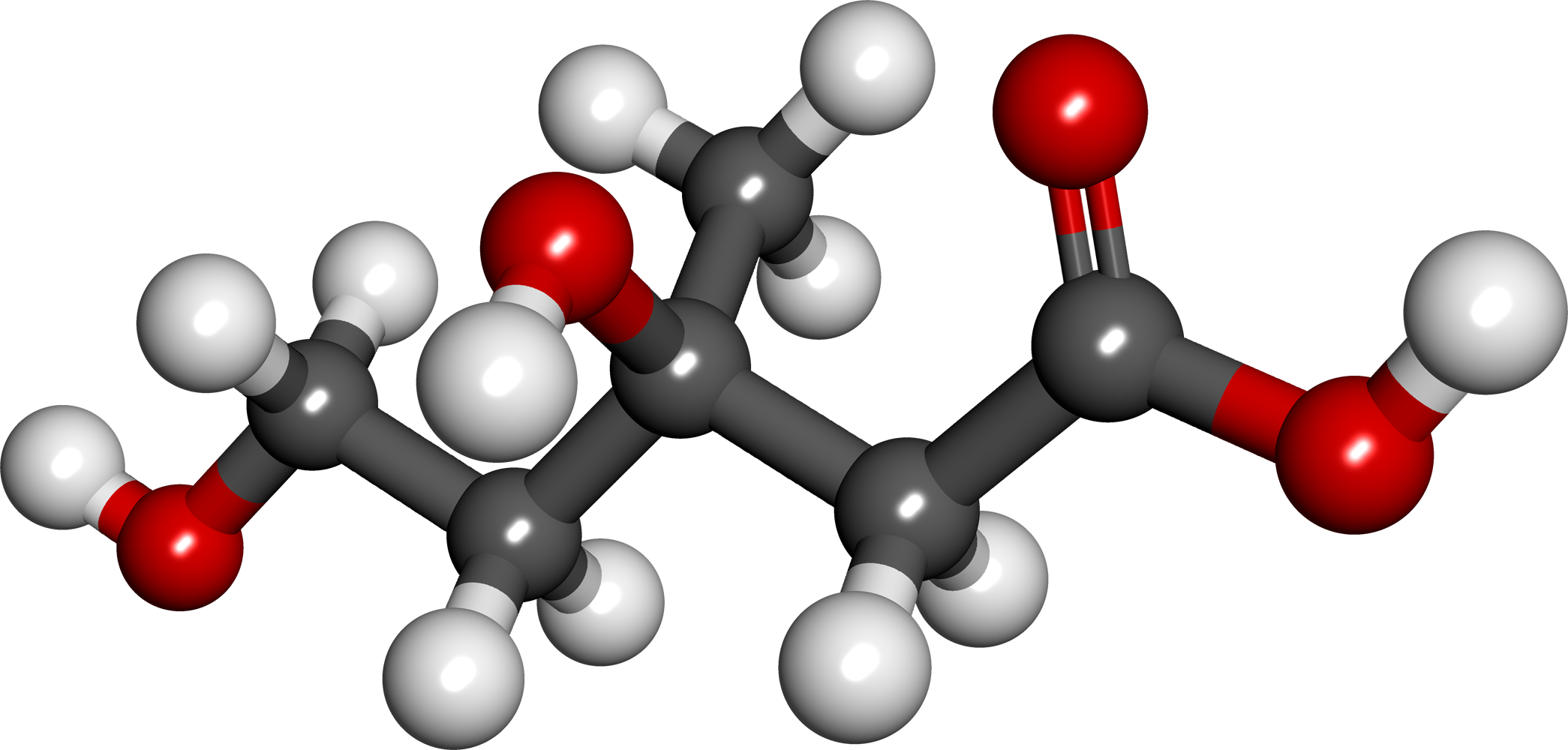

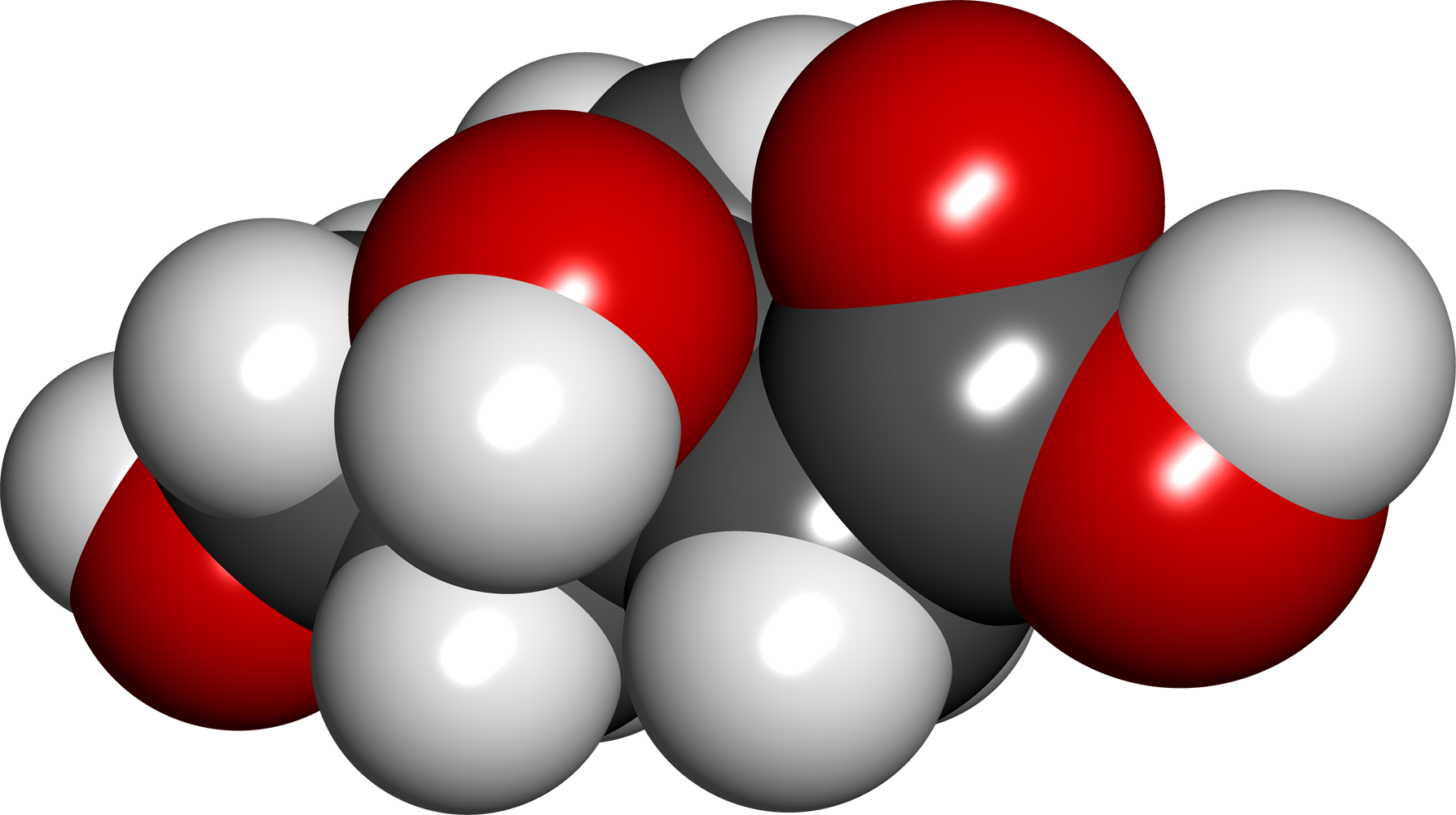

Names
- Preferred IUPAC name (3R)-3,5-Dihydroxy-3-methylpentanoic acid

Identifiers
CAS Number	150-97-0
3D model (JSmol)	Interactive image
ChEBI	CHEBI:17710
ChemSpider	388367
KEGG	C00418
PubChem CID	439230
UNII	S5UOB36OCZ
CompTox Dashboard (EPA)	DTXSID801314151 DTXSID5040546, DTXSID801314151
- InChI: InChI=1S/C6H12O4/c1-6(10,2-3-7)4-5(8)9/h7,10H,2-4H2,1H3,(H,8,9)/t6-/m1/s1 Key: KJTLQQUUPVSXIM-ZCFIWIBFSA-N; InChI=1/C6H12O4/c1-6(10,2-3-7)4-5(8)9/h7,10H,2-4H2,1H3,(H,8,9)/t6-/m1/s1 Key: KJTLQQUUPVSXIM-ZCFIWIBFBE
- SMILES: C[C@@](O)(CCO)CC(=O)O

Properties
Chemical formula	C_{6}H_{12}O_{4}
Molar mass	148.158 g·mol^{−1}
- Except where otherwise noted, data are given for materials in their standard state (at 25 °C [77 °F], 100 kPa). verify (what is ?) Infobox references

Mevalonic acid (MVA) is a key organic compound in biochemistry; the name is a contraction of dihydroxymethylvalerolactone. The carboxylate anion of mevalonic acid, which is the predominant form in biological environments, is known as mevalonate and is of major pharmaceutical importance. Drugs like statins (which lower levels of cholesterol) stop the production of mevalonate by inhibiting HMG-CoA reductase.

== Chemistry ==
Mevalonic acid is very soluble in water and polar organic solvents. It exists in equilibrium with its lactone form, called mevalonolactone, that is formed by internal condensation of its terminal alcohol and carboxylic acid functional groups with loss of water and formation of a six membered ring. Mevalonolactone acts to correct statin linked myopathy and limb girdle muscular disease caused by HMG CoA reductase mutation.

== Biology ==
Mevalonic acid is a precursor in the biosynthetic pathway known as the mevalonate pathway that produces terpenes and steroids. Mevalonic acid is the primary precursor of isopentenyl pyrophosphate (IPP), that is in turn the basis for all terpenoids. Mevalonic acid is chiral and the (3R)-enantiomer is the only one that is biologically active.

Mevalonate pathway: The figure doesn't show that the HMG-CoA synthase needs another Acetyl-CoA as Substrate. Moreover, the enzyme that synthesizes mevalonic acid (HMG-CoA reductase) consumes two equivalents of NADH and releases one reduced CoA-SH.

== See also ==
- Fructilactobacillus fructivorans
- Sake
