= DXP =

DXP may refer to:

- 1-Deoxy-D-xylulose 5-phosphate, chemical compound
- 1-deoxy-D-xylulose-5-phosphate synthase (also DXP-synthase), an enzyme
- Deep eXecution Processor, a class of processor made by British multinational fabless semiconductor company Icera
- Domino's DXP, custom third-generation Chevrolet Sparks commissioned by Domino's Pizza
- DXP Productions, the record label that released the debut album by English progressive rock band DeeExpus, Half Way Home
- DXP reductoisomerase, an enzyme
- DXP, acronym of Digital Experience Platform
