= 4-Diphosphocytidyl-2-C-methylerythritol =

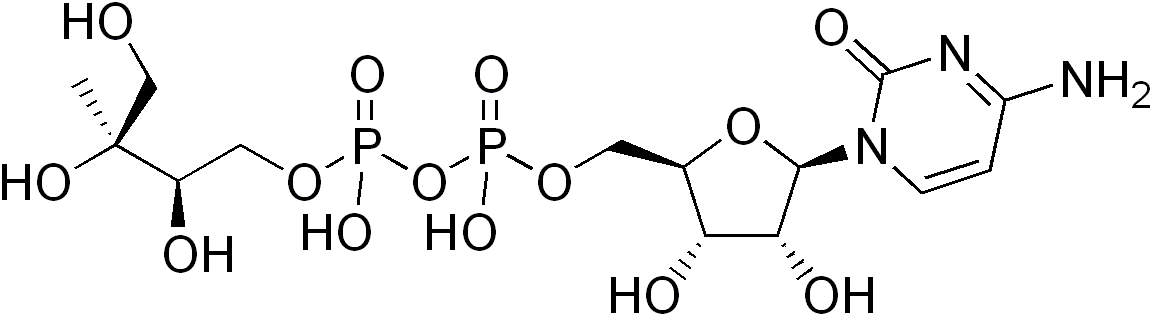

Names
- IUPAC name Cytidine 5′-(1-deoxy-2-C-methyl-D-erythritol-1-yl dihydrogen diphosophate)
- Preferred IUPAC name O^{1}-{[(2R,3S,4R,5R)-5-(4-Amino-2-oxopyrimidin-1(2H)-yl)-3,4-dihydroxyoxan-2-yl]methyl} O^{3}-[(2R,3S)-2,3,4-trihydroxy-3-methylbutyl] dihydrogen diphosphate

Identifiers
CAS Number	263016-94-0
3D model (JSmol)	Interactive image
ChEBI	CHEBI:16578
ChemSpider	391471
KEGG	C11435
MeSH	4-diphosphocytidyl-2-C-methylerythritol
PubChem CID	443199
UNII	FB44VKC5JD
CompTox Dashboard (EPA)	DTXSID50332065
- InChI: InChI=1S/C14H25N3O14P2/c1-14(23,6-18)8(19)5-29-33(26,27)31-32(24,25)28-4-7-10(20)11(21)12(30-7)17-3-2-9(15)16-13(17)22/h2-3,7-8,10-12,18-21,23H,4-6H2,1H3,(H,24,25)(H,26,27)(H2,15,16,22)/t7-,8-,10-,11-,12-,14+/m1/s1 Key: YFAUKWZNPVBCFF-XHIBXCGHSA-N
- SMILES: CC(CO)(C(COP(=O)(O)OP(=O)(O)OCC1C(C(C(O1)N2C=CC(=NC2=O)N)O)O)O)O

Properties
Chemical formula	C_{14}H_{25}N_{3}O_{14}P_{2}
Molar mass	521.31 g/mol
- Except where otherwise noted, data are given for materials in their standard state (at 25 °C [77 °F], 100 kPa). Infobox references

4-Diphosphocytidyl-2-C-methylerythritol (or CDP-ME) is an intermediate in the MEP pathway (non-mevalonate pathway) of isoprenoid precursor biosynthesis. It is produced by the enzyme 2-C-methyl-D-erythritol 4-phosphate cytidylyltransferase (IspD) and is a substrate for CDP-ME kinase (IspE).

== Biochemical role ==
CDP-ME is an intermediate in the non-mevalonate pathway for the biosynthesis of the isoprenoid precursors isopentenyl pyrophosphate and dimethylallyl pyrophosphate. Most gram-negative bacteria, the photosynthetic cyanobacteria and green algae use only this pathway, while higher plants also use the mevalonate pathway.

The enzyme 2-C-methyl-D-erythritol 4-phosphate cytidylyltransferase combines 2-C-methylerythritol 4-phosphate and cytidine triphosphate to form CDP-ME, with a pyrophosphate (PP_{i}) fragment as a byproduct:

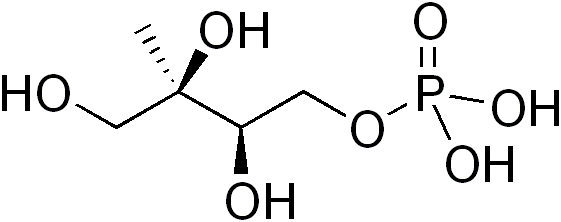
2-C-methylerythritol 4-phosphate
+
cytidine triphosphate
PP_{i}
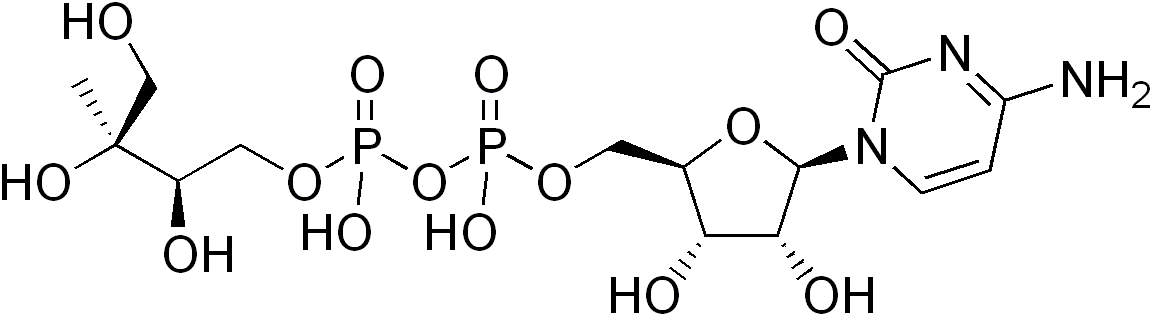
CDP-ME

In the next step, the enzyme 4-(cytidine 5'-diphospho)-2-C-methyl-D-erythritol kinase uses the cofactor, adenosine triphosphate (ATP) to introduce a terminal phosphate group, giving 4-diphosphocytidyl-2-C-methyl-D-erythritol 2-phosphate (CDP-MEP) and adenosine diphosphate (ADP):

ATP + CDP-ME
ADP +
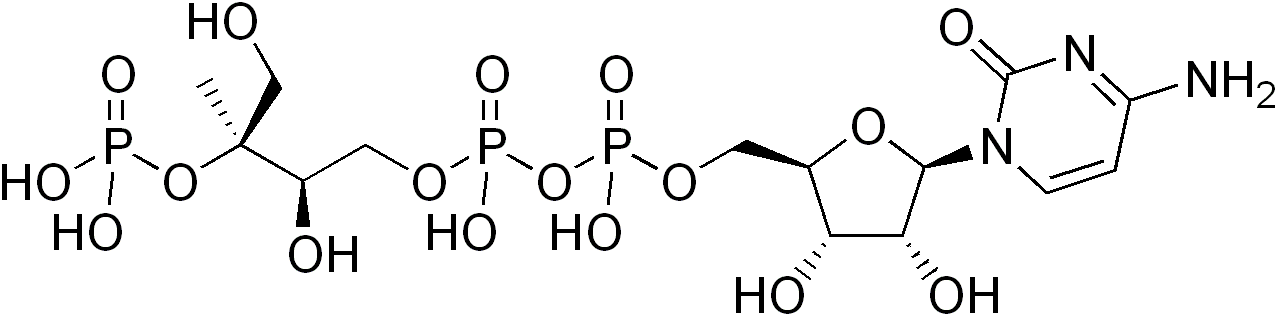
CDP-MEP
