= Dimethylallyltranstransferase =

Mammalian protein found in humans

FDPS

Identifiers
- Aliases: FDPS, FPPS, FPS, POROK9, farnesyl diphosphate synthase
- External IDs: OMIM: 134629; MGI: 104888; GeneCards: FDPS
Available structures
| PDB | Ortholog search: PDBe RCSB |
| PDB | List of PDB id codes 1YQ7, 1YV5, 1ZW5, 2F7M, 2F89, 2F8C, 2F8Z, 2F92, 2F94, 2F9K, 2OPM, 2OPN, 2QIS, 2RAH, 2VF6, 3B7L, 3CP6, 3N1V, 3N1W, 3N3L, 3N45, 3N46, 3N49, 3N5H, 3N5J, 3N6K, 3RYE, 3S4J, 4DEM, 4GA3, 4H5C, 4H5D, 4H5E, 4JVJ, 4KFA, 4KPD, 4KPJ, 4KQ5, 4KQS, 4KQU, 4L2X, 4LFV, 4LPG, 4LPH, 4N1Z, 4N9U, 4NFI, 4NFJ, 4NFK, 4NG6, 4NKE, 4NKF, 4NUA, 4OGU, 4P0V, 4P0W, 4P0X, 4PVX, 4PVY, 4Q23, 4QPF, 4QXS, 4RXA, 4XQR, 5CG5, 5DIQ, 5CG6, 5DJR, 5DJP, 4XQS, 5DJV, 5DGN, 4XQT, 5DGM, 5DGS |
Enzyme activity
| EC # | BRENDA | ExPASy | KEGG | MetaCyc |
|---|---|---|---|---|
| 2.5.1.1 | ↗ | ↗ | ↗ | ↗ |
| 2.5.1.10 | ↗ | ↗ | ↗ | ↗ |

Gene location (Human)
| Chr. | Chromosome 1 (human) |
| Band | 1q22 | Start | 155,308,748 bp |
| Band | 1q22 | End | 155,320,666 bp |

Gene location (Mouse)
| Chr. | Chromosome 3 (mouse) |
| Band | 3 F1|3 39.01 cM | Start | 89,000,895 bp |
| Band | 3 F1|3 39.01 cM | End | 89,009,266 bp |
RNA expression pattern
| Bgee | Human / Mouse (ortholog); Top expressed in: ventricular zone; mucosa of transverse colon; ganglionic eminence; right adrenal gland; skin of thigh; tendon of biceps brachii; right adrenal cortex; right lobe of liver; upper lobe of left lung; mucosa of esophagus / Top expressed in: mesencephalon; neural tube; morula; lip; esophagus; hepatobiliary system; exocrine gland; liver; ovary; adrenal gland; More reference expression data |
| BioGPS | n/a |
Gene ontology
| Molecular function | transferase activity; metal ion binding; geranyltranstransferase activity; dimethylallyltranstransferase activity; RNA binding |
| Cellular component | nucleoplasm; cytoplasm; cytosol; mitochondrion |
| Biological process | cholesterol biosynthetic process; steroid metabolic process; viral process; cholesterol metabolic process; geranyl diphosphate biosynthetic process; sterol biosynthetic process; isoprenoid biosynthetic process; lipid metabolism; steroid biosynthetic process; farnesyl diphosphate biosynthetic process; regulation of cholesterol biosynthetic process |
Sources:Amigo / QuickGO
Orthologs
| Databases | NCBI: entry; OMA: entry |
| Species | Human | Mouse |
| Entrez | 2224 | 110196 |
| Ensembl | ENSG00000160752 | ENSMUSG00000059743 |
| UniProt | P14324 | Q920E5 |
| RefSeq (mRNA) | NM_001135821; NM_001135822; NM_001242824; NM_001242825; NM_002004 NM_001378424; NM_001378425 | NM_001253751; NM_134469; NM_180985 |
| RefSeq (protein) | NP_001129293; NP_001129294; NP_001229753; NP_001229754; NP_001995 NP_001365353; NP_001365354 | NP_001240680; NP_608219 |
| Location (UCSC) | Chr 1: 155.31 – 155.32 Mb | Chr 3: 89 – 89.01 Mb |
| PubMed search |
- Wikidata
| View/Edit Human | View/Edit Mouse |

Dimethylallyltranstransferase
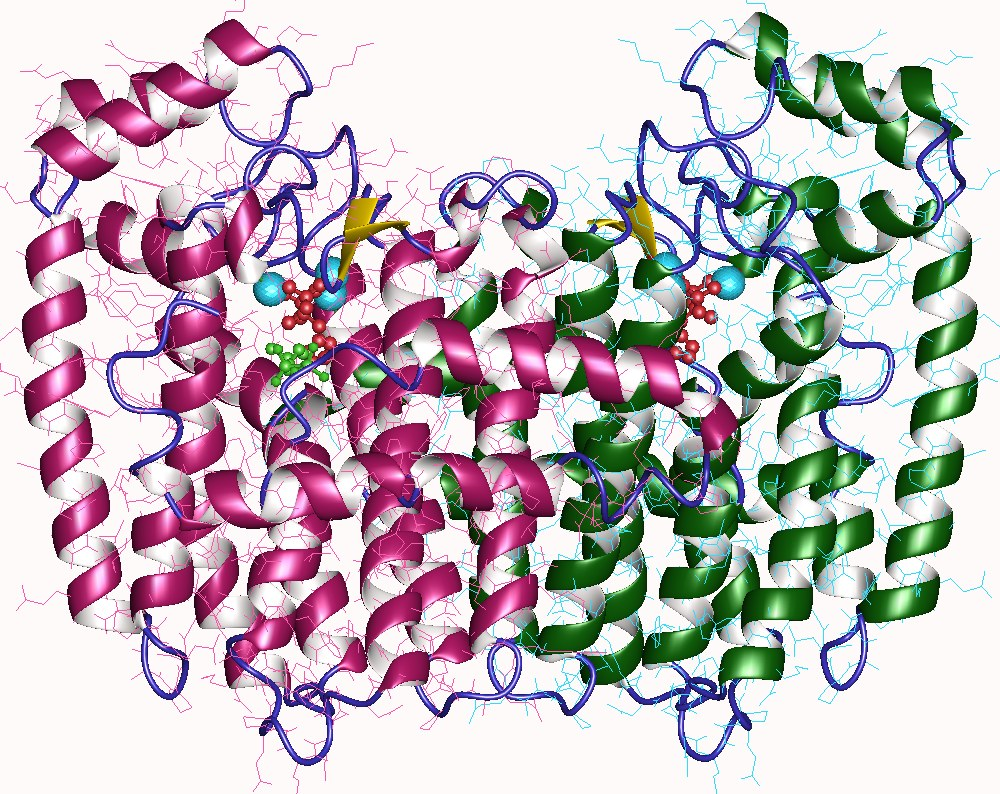

Identifiers
- EC no.: 2.5.1.1
- CAS no.: 9032-79-5

Databases
- BRENDA: enzyme data
- ExPASy: NiceZyme view
- KEGG: enzyme entry
- MetaCyc: metabolic pathway
- Rhea: reactions
- PDB structures: RCSB PDB PDBe PDBsum
Search
- PMC: articles
- PubMed: articles
- NCBI: proteins

Farnesyldiphosphate synthase (farnesylpyrophosphate synthetase, dimethylallyltranstransferase, geranyltranstransferase)

Identifiers
- Symbol: FDPS
- NCBI gene: 2224
- HGNC: 3631
- OMIM: 134629
- RefSeq: NM_002004
- UniProt: P14324

Other data
- EC number: 2.5.1.1
- Locus: Chr. 1 q22
Search for
- Structures: Swiss-model
- Domains: InterPro

Dimethylallyltranstransferase (DMATT), also known as farnesylpyrophosphate synthase (FPPS) or as farnesyldiphosphate synthase (FDPS), is an enzyme that in humans is encoded by the FDPS gene and catalyzes the transformation of dimethylallylpyrophosphate (DMAPP) and isopentenyl pyrophosphate (IPP) into farnesylpyrophosphate (FPP).

Pyrophosphate is also involved, as both a reactant and a product. Geranylpyrophosphate is created in an intermediate step.

== See also ==
- Geranyltranstransferase
