= 2-C-Methyl-D-erythritol-2,4-cyclopyrophosphate =

2-C-Methyl-d-erythritol-2,4-cyclodiphosphate

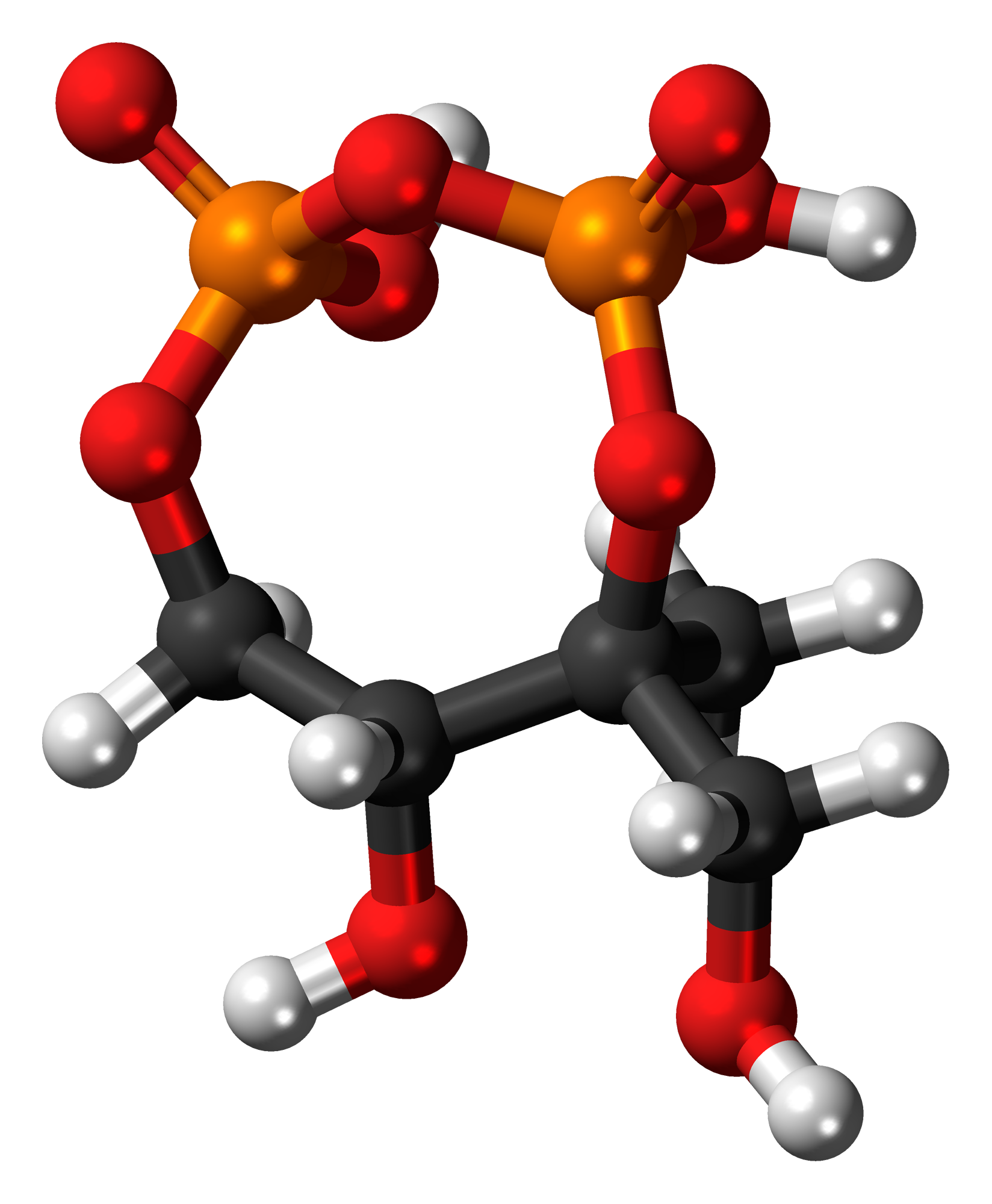

Names
- Systematic IUPAC name (6S,7R)-2,4,7-Trihydroxy-6-(hydroxymethyl)-6-methyl-1,3,5,2λ^{5},4λ^{5}-trioxadiphosphocane-2,4-dione

Identifiers
CAS Number	143488-44-2
3D model (JSmol)	Interactive image
ChEBI	CHEBI:18425
ChemSpider	112576
KEGG	C11453
MeSH	2-methyl-butan-1,2,3,4-tetraol-2,4-cyclopyrophosphate
PubChem CID	126747
CompTox Dashboard (EPA)	DTXSID10931210 DTXSID60610886, DTXSID10931210
- InChI: InChI=1S/C5H12O9P2/c1-5(3-6)4(7)2-12-15(8,9)14-16(10,11)13-5/h4,6-7H,2-3H2,1H3,(H,8,9)(H,10,11)/t4-,5+/m1/s1 Key: SFRQRNJMIIUYDI-UHNVWZDZSA-N
- SMILES: CC1(C(COP(=O)(OP(=O)(O1)O)O)O)CO

Properties
Chemical formula	C_{5}H_{12}O_{9}P_{2}
Molar mass	278.09 g/mol
- Except where otherwise noted, data are given for materials in their standard state (at 25 °C [77 °F], 100 kPa). Infobox references

2-C-Methyl-d-erythritol-2,4-cyclopyrophosphate (MEcPP) (also 2-C-Methyl-d-erythritol-2,4-cyclodiphosphate) is an intermediate in the MEP pathway (non-mevalonate) of isoprenoid precursor biosynthesis. MEcPP is produced by MEcPP synthase (IspF) and is a substrate for HMB-PP synthase (IspG).

== Biochemical role ==
MEcPP is an intermediate in the non-mevalonate pathway for the biosynthesis of the isoprenoid precursors isopentenyl pyrophosphate and dimethylallyl pyrophosphate. Most gram-negative bacteria, the photosynthetic cyanobacteria and green algae use only this pathway, while higher plants also use the mevalonate pathway.

The enzyme 2-C-methyl-D-erythritol 2,4-cyclodiphosphate synthase, splits 4-diphosphocytidyl-2-C-methyl-D-erythritol 2-phosphate (CDP-MEP) into MEcPP and cytidine monophosphate.

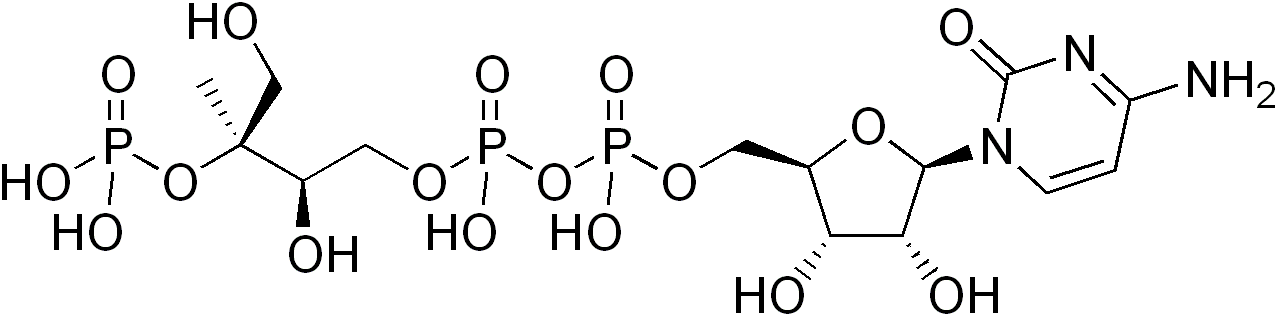
CDP-MEP
MEcPP
+
cytidine monophosphate

Next, 4-hydroxy-3-methylbut-2-en-1-yl diphosphate synthase uses two reduced ferredoxin proteins per molecule of MEcPP to convert it to (E)-4-hydroxy-3-methyl-but-2-enyl pyrophosphate (HMB-PP):

MEcPP + 2 oxidised ferredoxin
H_{2}O
HMB-PP
+ 2 reduced ferredoxin

Under conditions of oxidative stress, MEcPP accumulates in certain bacteria. MEcPP releases histone-like proteins from DNA, triggering nucleoid decondensation in Chlamydia trachomatis during the process of terminal differentiation. Abiotic stresses to plants, including wounding and excessive high-light exposure, lead to an increase in MEcPP accumulation in chloroplasts. Transported from the chloroplast to the plant cell nucleus, MEcPP engages in retrograde signalling that leads to the specific induction of nuclear-encoded stress-response genes.
