= C5H12O7P2 =

The molecular formula C_{5}H_{12}O_{7}P_{2} (molar mass: 246.09 g/mol, exact mass: 246.0058 u) may refer to:

- Dimethylallyl pyrophosphate (DMAPP)
- Isopentenyl pyrophosphate (IPP)
