= Non-peptidic antigen =

Non-peptidic antigens are low-molecular-weight compounds that stimulate human Vγ9/Vδ2 T cells. The most potent activator for Vγ9/Vδ2 T cells is (E)-4-hydroxy-3-methyl-but-2-enyl pyrophosphate (HMB-PP), a natural intermediate of the non-mevalonate pathway of isopentenyl pyrophosphate (IPP) biosynthesis. HMB-PP is an essential metabolite in most pathogenic bacteria including Mycobacterium tuberculosis as well as in malaria parasites, but is absent from the human host.

IPP itself is structurally closely related to HMB-PP and ubiquitously present in all living cells (i.e., also in human cells), yet its potency in vitro is 10,000-fold reduced; whether IPP represents a physiological 'danger' signal of stressed or transformed cells is still unclear.

Of pharmacological interest and with bioactivities comparable to that of IPP are synthetic aminobisphosphonates such as zoledronate (Zometa) that are widely used to treat osteoporosis and bone metastases, and act as Vγ9/Vδ2 T cell receptor agonists.

Certain alkylated amines have been described to activate Vγ9/Vδ2 T cells in vitro, however only at millimolar concentrations, i.e., with potencies 10^{6}-fold to 10^{8}-fold lower than those of HMB-PP, thereby questioning their physiological relevance.
