= Gamma delta T cell =

T cell subset

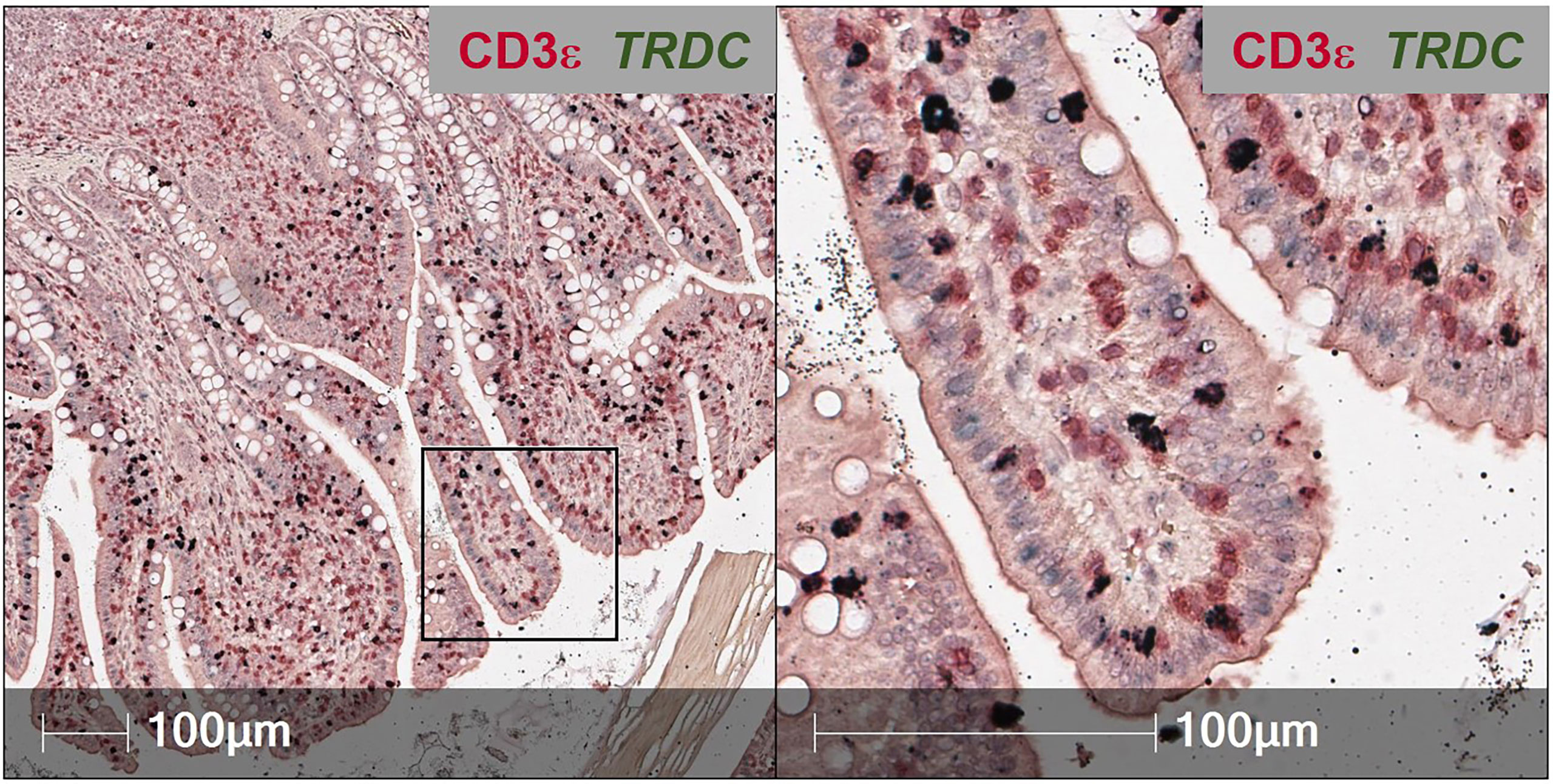
TRDC^{+} cells (darkgreen) are γδ T-cells, TRDC^{-}CD3e^{+} cells (red) are αβ T-cells.

Gamma delta T cells (γδ T cells) are T cells that have a γδ T-cell receptor (TCR) on their surface. Most T cells are αβ (alpha beta) T cells with TCR composed of two glycoprotein chains called α (alpha) and β (beta) TCR chains. In contrast, γδ T cells have a TCR that is made up of one γ (gamma) chain and one δ (delta) chain. This group of T cells is usually less common than αβ T cells. Their highest abundance is in the gut mucosa, within a population of lymphocytes known as intraepithelial lymphocytes (IELs).

The antigenic molecules that activate γδ T cells are largely unknown. γδ T cells are peculiar in that they do not seem to require antigen processing and major-histocompatibility-complex (MHC) presentation of peptide epitopes, although some recognize MHC class Ib molecules. γδ T cells are believed to have a prominent role in lipid antigen recognition. They are of an invariant nature. They may be triggered by alarm signals such as heat shock proteins (HSP).

A γδ-T-cell sub-population exists within the epidermal compartment of mice skin. Originally referred to as Thy-1+ dendritic epidermal cells (Thy1+DEC), these cells are more commonly known as dendritic epidermal T cells (DETC). DETCs arise during fetal development and express an invariant and canonical Vγ3 Vδ1 T-cell receptor (using Garman nomenclature).

== Innate and adaptive immunity ==
The conditions that lead to responses of γδ T cells are not fully understood, and current concepts of them as 'first line of defense', 'regulatory cells', or 'bridge between innate and adaptive responses' only address facets of their complex behavior. In fact, γδ T cells form an entire lymphocyte system that develops under the influence of other leukocytes in the thymus and in the periphery. When mature, they develop into functionally distinct subsets that obey their own (mostly unknown) rules and have countless direct and indirect effects on healthy tissues and immune cells, pathogens and tissues enduring infections, and the host responses to them.

Like other 'unconventional' T cell subsets bearing invariant TCRs, such as CD1d-restricted Natural Killer T cells, γδ T cells exhibit several characteristics that place them at the border between the more evolutionarily primitive innate immune system that permits a rapid beneficial response to a variety of foreign agents and the adaptive immune system, where B and T cells coordinate a slower but highly antigen-specific immune response leading to long-lasting memory against subsequent challenges by the same antigen.

γδ T cells may be considered a component of adaptive immunity in that they rearrange TCR genes to produce junctional diversity and can develop a memory phenotype. However, the various subsets may also be considered part of the innate immunity in which a specific TCR can function as a pattern recognition receptor. For example, according to this paradigm, large numbers of (human) Vγ9/Vδ2 T cells respond within hours to common molecules produced by microbes, and highly restricted intraepithelial Vδ1 T cells will respond to stressed epithelial cells bearing sentinels of danger.

Recent work has shown that human Vγ9/Vδ2 T cells are also capable of phagocytosis, a function previously exclusive to innate myeloid lineage cells such as neutrophils, monocytes and dendritic cells This provides further evidence that the biology of γδ T cells spans both innate and adaptive immune responses.

== Murine thermogenesis ==
Recently, it was believed that γδ17 T cells were only able to produce IL-17 in acute infections. It was recently discovered that γδ17 T cells can produce IL-17 even when the immune response is not induced. These cells are likely to be generated from fetal γδ thymocytes and as they egress from the thymus, they will progress to non-lymphoid tissues such as lungs, peritoneal cavity, dermis, tongue and uterus.

The γδ17 T that will accumulate in the adipose tissue (dermis) will not only controls the homeostasis of regulatory T cells but also an adaptive thermogenesis, therefore they are able to control the maintenance of core body temperature. Using aging mice as a model, the molecular and cellular mechanisms that act under thermoneutrality circumstances (steady state) or after cold exposure have recently been acknowledged.

When mice are in a steady state, IL-17 produced by the γδ17 T cells will stimulate stromal cells expressing the IL-17 receptor to produce IL-33 in vivo, and therefore provide a molecular link to T reg cells expressing the IL-33 receptor ST2 in the adipose tissue, so ST2+ Treg cells will accumulate and this will lead to the maintenance of tissue homeostasis. This recent finding explains the mechanism by which the number of T reg cells continuously increases during aging. On the other hand, it has been shown that, after exposing mice to cold, the production of TNF and IL-17 will act on the adipocytes uncoupling the protein UCP1, which is required for inducing a UCP1-dependent thermogenic program.

== Autoimmunity ==
Autoimmune disease results from abnormal response of immune system. Production of autoantibodies or autoreactive T cells is present during such disease. The role of γδ T cell in autoimmune disease is to help B cells to produce autoantibodies, through proinflammatory cytokines. IL-17A is important for development and progression of autoimmune diseases. Main sources are Th17 CD4+ αβ T cells, but γδ T cell subset plays role in autoimmune pathogenesis and regulation, too, because they contribute to production of IL-17A and other chemokines. They also interact with other innate and adaptive immune cells and modulate their functions. γδ T cells enhance or suppress inflammation, depending on the site and stage of disease. They rise from periphery and can be accumulated in inflamed tissue. These T cells can become active without TCR ligand – they can induce inflammation in autoimmune diseases very fast.

γδ T cells have clinical association with many autoimmune diseases.

=== Inflammatory bowel diseases IBD ===
γδ T cells are a major T cell subset of intraepithelial lymphocytes (IEL) present in the epithelial layer of mucosa. They regulate immunosuppressive functions of IELs and play role in development of tolerance. These so-called protective γδ T cells promote tissue repair and cell healing. Pathogens and other inflammation stimuli cause production of retinoic acid by dendritic cells, it induces γδ T cells to produce IL-22. This cytokine is responsible for cell-mediated production of antimicrobial peptides and tissue repair.

On the other hand, pathogenic γδ T cells produce IL-17. This cytokine induces Th17 cells differentiation, and dendritic cell- mediated production of IL-12 and IL-23 promotes differentiation of Th17 cells to Th1 cells, which produce IFN‐γ. Matrix metalloproteinases and NO present in inflamed tissue damage and degrade basal membrane, leading to development of IBD.

=== Type 1 diabetes T1D ===
T1D is an autoimmune disease where β cells of the pancreas, which produce insulin, are damaged by autoreactive T cells. There is infiltration of both innate and adaptive immune cells in pancreas. Studies on mice showed that γδ T cells play a role in T1D pathogenesis. They infiltrate islets and may even co-operate with αβ T cells to induce T1D.

=== Rheumatoid arthritis RA ===
RA is a chronic autoimmune disease caused by accumulation of self-reactive T cells, which are induced by inflammation in synovial fluid and joints. RA patients have higher numbers of γδ T cells producing IL-17. It leads to production of inflammatory cytokines by neutrophils, macrophages and fibroblasts, and RANKL by osteoblasts (RANKL causes conversion of precursors into osteoclasts). Matrix metalloproteinases and cathepsins induced by inflammatory cytokines, together with RANKL, cause bone and cartilage erosion, which leads to RA development.

=== Multiple sclerosis MS ===
γδ T cells are involved in development of this autoimmune disease. They are cytotoxic against oligodendrocytes, cells that participate in the myelinization of axons. Patients have increased numbers of γδ T cells in brain and cerebrospinal fluid, and these cells accumulate in demyelinated areas of CNS and make plaques. In the mice models, different subsets of γδ T cells were identified. The most abundant were the ones producing IL-17. IL-17 induces Th17 cells and Th17 response.

=== Psoriasis ===
Psoriasis is one of the autoimmune diseases in which the γδ T cells together with Th1 and Th17 play an essential role in the disease development. In response to IL-23, the adipose gamma T cells will produce IL-17, and this interleukin promotes development and progression of psoriasis. Also it has been proven that Vγ9Vδ2 T cells in patients with Psoriasis participate in the development of the disease. The number of Vγ9Vδ2 T cells increase in the skin lesions of psoriasis patients but decreased in the blood. This finding indicates redistribution of Vγ9Vδ2 T cells from the blood to the skin compartment in psoriasis. The psoriasis severity is associated with lower level of γ9Vδ2 T cells in the circulation, therefore a successful anti-psoriatic therapy leads to increase of peripheral Vγ9Vδ2 T cells. The major outcome is that the measurement of these cells in blood and skin lesions can be used as a marker in order to follow up the psoriasis progression.

== Cancer ==
Non-MHC restricted recognition of antigens and high cytokine secretion of γδ T cells suggest that these cells can be effective in cancer immunotherapy. Trials in numerous cancers (renal carcinoma, leukemia, lung cancer) showed that they are tolerated and safe, but some studies report that γδ T cells cause cancer development for example through production of IL-17 in the tumor microenvironment, which promotes angiogenesis and cell growth or because their ability to increase numbers of myeloid derived suppressor cells. Therefore, the effectiveness of immunotherapy based on γδ T cells is limited. Their invariant nature implies that immunotherapies that rely on them would not require customization for individual patients.

γδ T cells can be divided into effector and regulatory cells:

=== Effector functions ===
After infiltrating a tumor as a response to chemokines produced by monocytes and macrophages, γδ T cells interact with stress-induced molecules on tumor cells and secrete cytotoxic molecules, inflammatory cytokines and activate adaptive immunity cells. They can also lyse tumor cells by antibody‐dependent cellular cytotoxicity (ADCC) (through binding Fc region of IgG deposited on tumor cells). γδ T cells secrete IFN-γ and IL-17, which leads to higher expression of MHC-I, positive regulation of cytotoxic T lymphocytes and induction of anti-tumor response. γδ T cells also interact with DCs and develop Th1 response.

=== Regulatory functions ===
γδ T cells perform a regulatory and suppressive role in the TME expression of transcription factors (FoxP3, Helios) and CD86-CTLA-4 interaction between APCs and γδ T cells. They also impair effector immune cells (DC, NK, iNKT, CD8+ T cells) through IL-4, IL-10 and TGF-β. Also IL-17 secreted by γδ T cells has pro-tumorogenic role (enhanced angiogenesis, recruitment of macrophages, expansion and polarization of neutrophils and their suppression of CD8+ T cells).

== Gene families in different species ==
=== Laboratory mice (Mus musculus) ===
==== Mouse Vγ chains ====
This table summarizes the nomenclature of mouse Vγ chains and indicates monoclonal antibodies often used to identify these chains. This system has been best described in strain C57BL/6 and might not apply well to other strains. There are two systems of nomenclature in use (Heilig; Garman), and many writers do not indicate which system they use. For example, the IMGT (International Immunogenetics Information System) uses the Heilig notation, but does not indicate this fact on its website. This table refers to variable chain Vγ gene segments and to monoclonal antibodies that detect the corresponding Vγ protein chains. Note that Adrian Hayday's proposed nomenclature is not widely used, leaving considerable confusion in the literature. One advantage and weakness of the Hayday nomenclature is that it is based on the gene order in the B6 genome, but this might not apply to other strains.

Heilig and Tonegawa's system	Garman's system	"Hayday's system"	antibodies	comments
Vγ5	Vγ3	GV1S1	536; 17D1 specific for Vγ5(Heilig)+Vδ1 clonotype	Skin, Jγ1Cγ1
Vγ6	Vγ4	GV2S1	17D1; can detect Vγ6Vδ1 when pretreated with GL3 antibodies	reproductive mucosa;Jγ1Cγ1
Vγ4	Vγ2	GV3S1	UC310A6	lung;Jγ1Cγ1
Vγ7	Vγ5	GV4S1	F2.67 Pereira	most common form in intestinal IEL orthologous to human Vγ1; Jγ1Cγ1
Vγ1	Vγ1.1	GV5S1	2.11 Pereira 1995	peripheral lymphoid tissues;Jγ4Cγ4
Vγ2	Vγ1.2	GV5S2		Jγ1Cγ1
Vγ3	Vγ1.3	GV5S3		Jγ3-pseudoCγ3

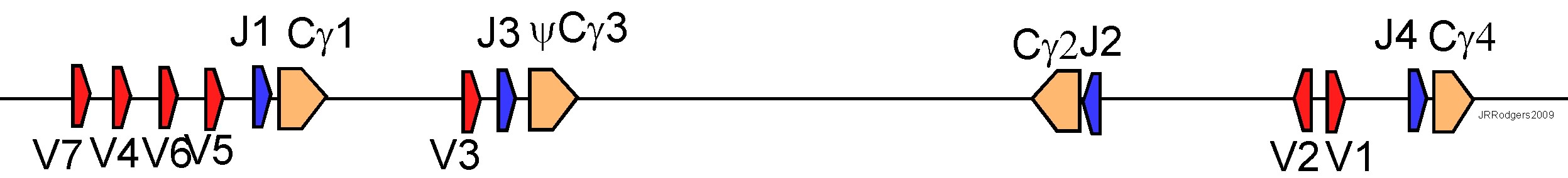
Mouse Vgamma locus for C57BL/6 genome; drawn to scale. Chromosome 13: 1.927 to 1.440 Megabp Heilig notation

=== Human forms ===
==== Human Vδ2^{+} T cells ====
Vγ9/Vδ2 T cells are unique to humans and primates and represent a minor and unconventional constituent of the leukocyte population in peripheral blood (0.5–5%), yet they are assumed to play an early and essential role in sensing 'danger' by invading pathogens as they expand dramatically in many acute infections and may exceed all other lymphocytes within a few days, e.g. in tuberculosis, salmonellosis, ehrlichiosis, brucellosis, tularemia, listeriosis, toxoplasmosis, and malaria.

Of note, all Vγ9/Vδ2 T cells recognize the same small microbial compound (E)-4-hydroxy-3-methyl-but-2-enyl pyrophosphate (HMB-PP), a natural intermediate of the non-mevalonate pathway of isopentenyl pyrophosphate (IPP) biosynthesis. HMB-PP is an essential metabolite in most pathogenic bacteria including Mycobacterium tuberculosis and malaria parasites, but is absent from the human host. Bacterial species that lack the non-mevalonate pathway and synthesize IPP via the classical mevalonate pathway instead, such as Streptococcus, Staphylococcus, and Borrelia, are unable to produce HMB-PP and do not specifically activate Vγ9/Vδ2 T cells.

IPP itself is structurally closely related to HMB-PP and ubiquitously present in all living cells (including human cells), yet its potency in vitro is reduced 10,000-fold; whether IPP represents a physiological 'danger' signal of stressed or transformed cells is still unclear. Of pharmacological interest and with bioactivities comparable to that of IPP are synthetic aminobisphosphonates such as zoledronate (Zometa) or pamidronate (Aredia), that are widely used to treat osteoporosis and bone metastases, and incidentally act as Vγ9/Vδ2 T cell receptor agonists. However, increasing evidence suggests that these aminobisphosphonate 'antigens' are not recognised directly by Vγ9/Vδ2 T cells and in fact act indirectly, via their effects on the mevalonate biosynthetic pathway, leading to an accumulation of IPP. Finally, certain alkylated amines have been described to activate Vγ9/Vδ2 T cells in vitro, however only at millimolar concentrations, i.e. with potencies 10^{6}-10^{8}-fold lower than those of HMB-PP, thereby raising questions about their physiological relevance.

It is still not clear whether these non-peptidic antigens bind directly to the Vγ9/Vδ2 TCR or if a presenting element exists. There is evidence for a requirement for a species-specific cell-cell contact. However, none of the known antigen-presenting molecules like MHC class I and II or CD1 are required for γδ T cell activation suggesting the existence of a novel presenting element. Strong support for a direct recognition of non-peptide antigens by the Vγ9/Vδ2 TCR comes from studies which demonstrated that a transfected Vγ9/Vδ2 TCR can confer responsiveness onto a hitherto unresponsive cell; furthermore, antibodies to the γδ TCR block recognition. Thus, the presence of a functional Vγ9/Vδ2 TCR appears mandatory for a response to non-peptidic antigens although the basis for the huge differences in bioactivity between closely related molecules like HMB-PP and IPP cannot be explained by conventional epitope presentation/recognition models.

These Vγ9Vδ2 T cells can also behave like professional antigen-presenting cells (APC). It seems that human Vγ9Vδ2 T cells are characterized by a specific inflammatory migration program, including multiple receptors for inflammatory chemokines (CXCR3, CCR1, CCR2 and CCR5). It means that the stimulation with IPP or HMB-PP induces migration to the lymphatic tissues, specifically to the T cell area of lymph nodes. So the stimulation of Vγ9Vδ2 T cells with phosphoantigens results in expression of multiple markers which are associated with APC, like MHC I and II molecules, co-stimulatory molecules (CD80, CD86) and adhesion receptors (CD11a, CD18, CD54). Thus activated Vγ9Vδ2 T cells behave like APCs (γδ T-APC) and present antigens to αβ T cells. This leads to turn of naïve CD4+ and CD8+ αβ T cells into effector cells. The differentiation, induced by γδ T-APC, most often led to T helper cell response, in the most of cases to pro-inflammatory Th1 response with subsequent production of IFN-γ and TNF-α. But in the case of a low γδ T-APC: CD4+ ratio it leads to differentiation of some naïve αβ T cells into Th2 (IL-4) or Th0 (IL-4 plus IFN-γ) cells. Human Vγ9Vδ2 T cells are also cells with excellent antigen cross-presentation activity, a process describing the uptake of exogenous antigen and its routing to the MHC I pathway for induction CD8+ cytotoxic T cells. Thus activated cytotoxic T cells can effectively kill infected or tumor cells. This fact can be used in the immunotherapy of cancer and infectious diseases.

==== Human non-Vδ2^{+} T cells ====
The extensive structural diversity of Vδ1 and Vδ3 TCRs and the existence of Vδ1^{+} clones reactive against MHC, MHC-like, or non-MHC molecules suggest recognition of a highly diverse and heterogeneous set of antigens by non-Vδ2 cells, although cognate interactions between non-Vδ2 TCRs and any of these antigens have not been shown yet. MHC class-I-chain-related gene A (MICA) has also been proposed as an important tumor antigen recognized by Vδ1^{+} T cells. However, the very low affinity of MICA–Vδ1 TCR interactions estimated by surface plasmon resonance analyses raises doubts about the functional relevance of MICA or MHC class-I-chain-related gene B (MICB) recognition by Vδ1^{+} TCRs.

Non-Vδ2 γδ T cells are expanded in various infectious contexts involving intracellular bacteria (mycobacteria and Listeria) as well as extracellular bacteria, such as Borrelia burgdorferi and viruses (HIV, cytomegalovirus). In most instances, the stimuli that trigger Vd1 expansion are not derived from pathogens but instead correspond to endogenous gene products presumably upregulated on infection. The antigens recognized by non-Vδ2 T cells expanded in the above infectious contexts have not been characterized, but the fact that Vδ1^{+} T-cell responses are not blocked by monoclonal antibody directed against known classical or non-classical MHC molecules suggests recognition of a new class of conserved stress-induced antigens. A recent study of primary cytomegalovirus infection in infants found increased Vδ1 T cells that also expressed the typically NK cell associated markers NKG2C and CD57.

A recent study has identified a specific subset of gut-resident Vδ1 IELs (intraepithelial lymphocytes) which express high levels of a natural cytotoxic receptor (NCR) which is NKp46. These receptors are expressed almost exclusively by natural killer (NK) cells and play a central role in triggering their activation, but it has been described that γδ T cells can express these receptors. These cells are named NKp46+/Vδ1 IELs.

The major outcome of this study is the clinical relevance of this cells, which can be used a prognostic marker in the colorectal cancer (CRC), in order to follow-up its progression. Lower frequencies of NKp46+/Vδ1 IELs in healthy intestinal tissues surrounding the tumor mass, associate with a higher tumor progression and metastasis. It is acknowledged that this subset can control the metastasis, so the higher levels of this population, the less probabilities for the tumor to progress and proliferate to other tissues.

== See also ==
- Naive T cells
- Memory T cells
- Helper T cells
- Cytotoxic T cells
- Natural killer T cells
- Innate immune system
- Adaptive immune system
- Regulatory T cells
