= ISPE =

ISPE may refer to:

- International Society for Pharmacoepidemiology
- Instituto Superior Parque de España
- 4-(cytidine 5'-diphospho)-2-C-methyl-D-erythritol kinase (IspE)
- I.S.P.E F.C., a football club in Myanmar
