= 7-Dimethylallyltryptophan synthase =

Class of enzymes

7-dimethylallyltryptophan synthase

Identifiers
- EC no.: 2.5.1.80

Databases
- IntEnz: IntEnz view
- BRENDA: BRENDA entry
- ExPASy: NiceZyme view
- KEGG: KEGG entry
- MetaCyc: metabolic pathway
- PRIAM: profile
- PDB structures: RCSB PDB PDBe PDBsum
Search
- PMC: articles
- PubMed: articles
- NCBI: proteins

7-dimethylallyltryptophan synthase (EC 2.5.1.80, 7-DMATS) is an enzyme with systematic name dimethylallyl-diphosphate:L-tryptophan 7-dimethylallyltransferase. It catalyses the following chemical reaction which adds a prenyl group from dimethylallyl pyrophosphate to L-tryptophan, specifically in its 7-position, giving 7-(3-methylbut-2-enyl)-L-tryptophan, with pyrophosphate (PP_{i}) as byproduct:

dimethylallyl pyrophosphate
+
tryptophan
PP_{i}
7-(3-methylbut-2-enyl)-L-tryptophan

This enzyme characterised from Aspergillus fumigatus is more flexible towards the aromatic substrate than tryptophan dimethylallyltransferase.
