= Isoprene synthase =

Identifiers
- EC no.: 4.2.3.27

Databases
- BRENDA: enzyme data
- ExPASy: NiceZyme view
- KEGG: enzyme entry
- MetaCyc: metabolic pathway
- Rhea: reactions
- PDB structures: RCSB PDB PDBe PDBsum
Search
- PMC: articles
- PubMed: articles
- NCBI: proteins

The enzyme isoprene synthase (EC 4.2.3.27) catalyzes the chemical reaction

dimethylallyl pyrophosphate $\longrightarrow$ isoprene + diphosphate

This enzyme belongs to the family of lyases, specifically those carbon-oxygen lyases acting on phosphates. The systematic name of this enzyme class is prenyl-diphosphate diphosphate-lyase (isoprene-forming). It is most commonly referred to as ISPS. The crystal structure of ISPS was the first of a hemiterpene synthase and was reported by the research group of David W. Christianson at the University of Pennsylvania.

The substrate of isoprene synthase, dimethylallyl pyrophosphate, can be synthesised via two metabolic pathways: the methylerythritol phosphate pathway (MEP pathway) and the mevalonate pathway (MVA pathway). Plants comprise both the MEP pathway in the chloroplast and the MVA pathway in the cytoplasm, whereas some bacteria and archaea contain only one of the pathway to produce dimethylallyl pyrophosphate (DMAPP) and isopentenyl pyrophosphate (IPP), the substrates for terpene biosynthesis.

Isoprene synthases are found in terrestrial plants that emit isoprene. The best characterised and most commonly used isoprene synthases for biotechnology include the enzymes encoded by Eucalyptus globulus, Ipomea batatas, kudzu, Populus x canescens, Metrosideros polymorpha. Even though isoprene synthase encoding genes have only been found in plant genomes, there are bacteria that produce isoprene, e.g. from the Bacillus genus. Despite isoprene production, the enzyme responsible for the production of isoprene remains unknown in these species. It has been reported, that the MEP pathway enzyme 4-hydroxy-3-methylbut-2-enyl diphosphate reductase (IspH), which catalyses the conversion of 4-hydroxy-3-methyl-but-2-enyl pyrophosphate (HMBPP) to IPP and DMAPP, has a promiscuous activity and can produce isoprene.

== Enzyme kinetics, catalytic mechanism and physiological role ==
Compared to other monoterpene synthases, isoprene synthases usually have a lower substrate affinity, i.e. a higher K_{M} value, which usually lies in the mM range, compared to other monoterpene synthases in the µM range. This is caused by the need of dimethylallyl pyrophosphate, for the synthesis of essential terpenes and pigments. Therefore, isoprene synthase does not compete for substrates with other terpene synthases. Plants generally produce isoprene as a response to stress, such as elevated temperature, or cold stress. Isoprene synthase required a divalent metal ion for its catalytic activity, which is most commonly Mg^{2+}. However, in vitro experiments also showed high catalytic activity of Metrosideros polymorpha isoprene synthase with other metal ion cofactors, such as Mn^{2+}, Zn^{2+}, Cu^{2+}, Ni^{2+} and Co^{2+}.

== Use in biotechnology ==
Isoprene synthase encoding genes are used in biotechnology for the microbial isoprene production. This has only been reported in smaller scale academic research. Most bacteria do not produce isoprene, but with introduction of a plant derived isoprene synthase gene different species have been reported to emit isoprene. In the heterotrophic model organism Escherichia coli, where production rates of up to 2 g L^{−1} h^{−1} have been reported using the kudzu isoprene synthase. Also photo-autotrophic organisms like cyanobacteria have been engineered to produce isoprene. Different isoprene synthases showed great differences in the production rates in the cyanobacterium Synechocystis sp. PCC6803, where the isoprene synthases from E. globulus and I. batatas showed the highest production rates, reaching up to 150 mg L^{−1} h^{−1} with E. globulus isoprene synthase. Those isoprene synthases are known to have a lower K_{M} and lower k_{cat} value, which seem to be important for their role in biotechnology in photo-autotrophic hosts.
