= 4-Diphosphocytidyl-2-C-methyl-D-erythritol 2-phosphate =

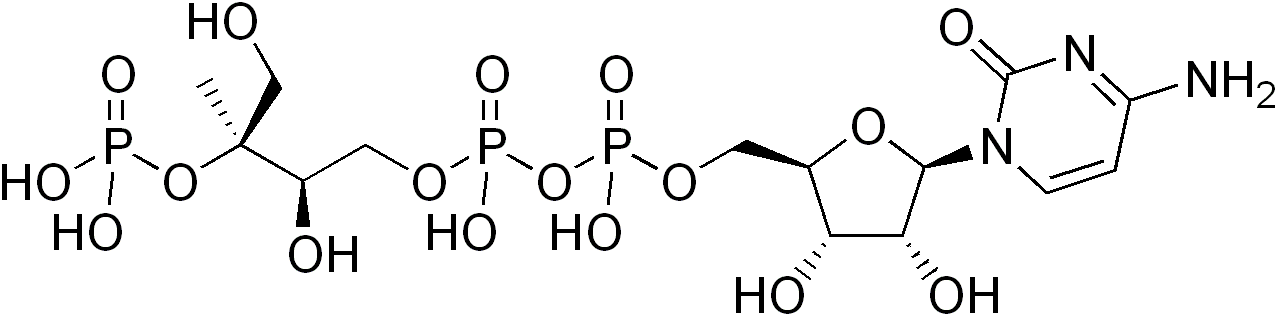

Names
- IUPAC name Cytidine 5′-(1-deoxy-2-C-methyl-2-O-phosphono-D-erythritol-1-yl dihydrogen diphosophate)
- Systematic IUPAC name O^{1}-{[(2R,3S,4R,5R)-5-(4-Amino-2-oxopyrimidin-1(2H)-yl)-3,4-dihydroxyoxan-2-yl]methyl} O^{3}-[(2R,3S)-2,4-dihydroxy-3-methyl-3-(phosphonooxy)butyl] dihydrogen diphosphate

Identifiers
CAS Number	263016-95-1
3D model (JSmol)	Interactive image
Beilstein Reference	8528909
ChEBI	CHEBI:16840
ChemSpider	391472
DrugBank	DB01859
KEGG	C11436
MeSH	4-diphosphocytidyl-2C+methylerythritol+2-phosphate
PubChem CID	443200
CompTox Dashboard (EPA)	DTXSID10332066
- InChI: InChI=1S/C14H26N3O17P3/c1-14(6-18,33-35(23,24)25)8(19)5-31-37(28,29)34-36(26,27)30-4-7-10(20)11(21)12(32-7)17-3-2-9(15)16-13(17)22/h2-3,7-8,10-12,18-21H,4-6H2,1H3,(H,26,27)(H,28,29)(H2,15,16,22)(H2,23,24,25)/t7-,8-,10-,11-,12-,14+/m1/s1 Key: HTJXTKBIUVFUAR-XHIBXCGHSA-N
- SMILES: C[C@](CO)([C@@H](COP(=O)(O)OP(=O)(O)OC[C@@H]1[C@H]([C@H]([C@@H](O1)N2C=CC(=NC2=O)N)O)O)O)OP(=O)(O)O

Properties
Chemical formula	C_{14}H_{26}N_{3}O_{17}P_{3}
Molar mass	601.29 g/mol
- Except where otherwise noted, data are given for materials in their standard state (at 25 °C [77 °F], 100 kPa). Infobox references

4-Diphosphocytidyl-2-C-methyl-D-erythritol 2-phosphate (or CDP-MEP, 4-diphosphocytidyl-2C methylerythritol 2-phosphate) is an intermediate in the MEP pathway of isoprenoid precursor biosynthesis.

It is formed by CDP-ME kinase (IspE) and is a substrate for 2C-methyl-D-erythritol 2,4-cyclodiphosphate synthase (IspF).

== Biochemical role ==
CDP-MEP is an intermediate in the non-mevalonate pathway for the biosynthesis of the isoprenoid precursors isopentenyl pyrophosphate and dimethylallyl pyrophosphate. Most gram-negative bacteria, the photosynthetic cyanobacteria and green algae use only this pathway, while higher plants also use the mevalonate pathway.

The enzyme 4-(cytidine 5'-diphospho)-2-C-methyl-D-erythritol kinase uses the cofactor, adenosine triphosphate (ATP) to introduce a terminal phosphate group to the immediate precursor, 4-diphosphocytidyl-2-C-methylerythritol (CDP-ME), giving CDP-MEP and adenosine diphosphate (ADP):

ATP +
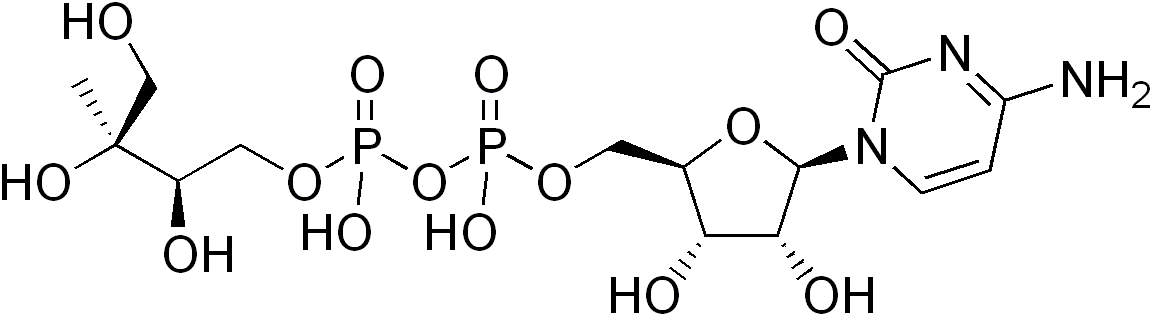
CDP-ME
ADP +
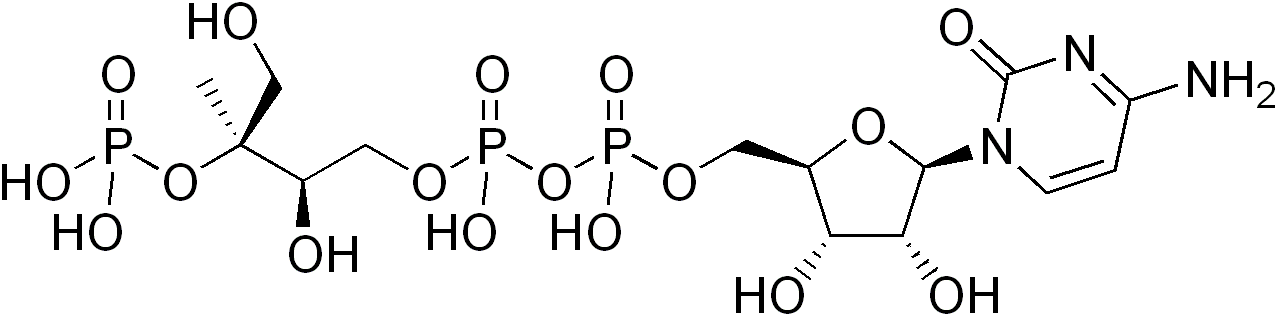
CDP-MEP

The next reaction, catalyzed by 2-C-methyl-D-erythritol 2,4-cyclodiphosphate synthase, splits CDP-MEP into 2-C-methyl-D-erythritol 2,4-cyclic diphosphate (MEcPP) and cytidine monophosphate.

CDP-MEP
MEcPP
+
cytidine monophosphate
