= 2-C-methyl-D-erythritol 2,4-cyclodiphosphate synthase =

Class of enzymes

Identifiers
- EC no.: 4.6.1.12

Databases
- IntEnz: IntEnz view
- BRENDA: BRENDA entry
- ExPASy: NiceZyme view
- KEGG: KEGG entry
- MetaCyc: metabolic pathway
- PRIAM: profile
- PDB structures: RCSB PDB PDBe PDBsum
- Gene Ontology: AmiGO / QuickGO
Search
- PMC: articles
- PubMed: articles
- NCBI: proteins

2-C-Methyl-D-erythritol 2,4-cyclodiphosphate synthase (MEcPP synthase, IspF, EC 4.6.1.12) is a zinc-dependent enzyme and a member of the YgbB N terminal protein domain, which participates in the non-mevalonate pathway (MEP pathway) of isoprenoid precursor biosynthesis. It catalyzes the following reaction:

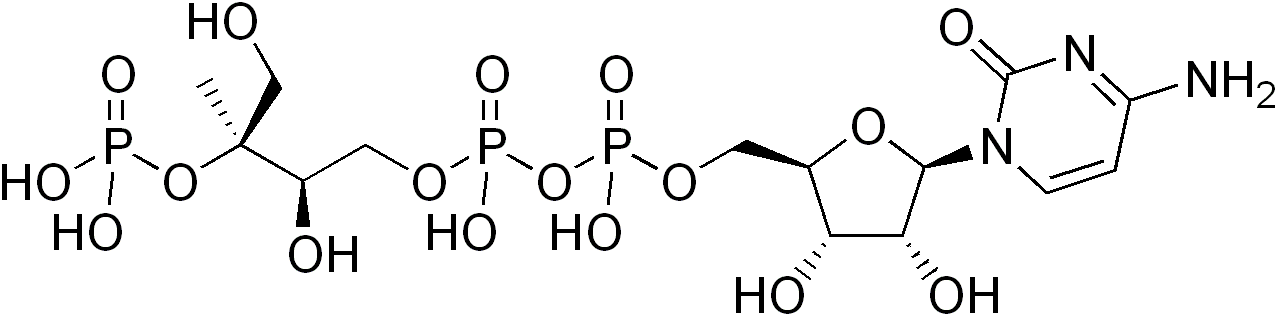
CDP-MEP
MEcPP
+
cytidine monophosphate

The reaction splits the precursor, 4-diphosphocytidyl-2-C-methyl-D-erythritol 2-phosphate (CDP-MEP) into 2-C-methyl-D-erythritol 2,4-cyclic diphosphate (MEcPP) and cytidine monophosphate. Most gram-negative bacteria, the photosynthetic cyanobacteria and green algae use only this pathway, while higher plants also use the mevalonate pathway.

The enzyme is a phosphorus-oxygen lyase. The systematic name of this enzyme class is 2-phospho-4-(cytidine 5′-diphospho)-2-C-methyl-D-D-erythritol CMP-lyase (cyclizing; 2-C-methyl-D-erythritol 2,4-cyclodiphosphate-forming). Other names in common use include IspF, YgbB and MEcPP synthase.

== Structural studies ==
As of late 2007, 20 structures have been solved for this class of enzymes, with PDB accession codes PDB: 1GX1, PDB: 1H47, PDB: 1H48, PDB: 1IV1, PDB: 1IV2, PDB: 1IV3, PDB: 1IV4, PDB: 1T0A, PDB: 1U3L, PDB: 1U3P, PDB: 1U40, PDB: 1U43, PDB: 1VH8, PDB: 1VHA, PDB: 1W55, PDB: 1W57, PDB: 1YQN, PDB: 2AMT, PDB: 2GZL, and PDB: 2PMP.
