= Geranyltranstransferase =

geranyltranstransferase

Identifiers
- EC no.: 2.5.1.10
- CAS no.: 37277-79-5

Databases
- BRENDA: enzyme data
- ExPASy: NiceZyme view
- KEGG: enzyme entry
- MetaCyc: metabolic pathway
- Rhea: reactions
- PDB structures: RCSB PDB PDBe PDBsum
- Gene Ontology: AmiGO / QuickGO
Search
- PMC: articles
- PubMed: articles
- NCBI: proteins

In enzymology, a geranyltranstransferase (EC 2.5.1.10) is an enzyme that catalyzes the chemical reaction

geranyl diphosphate + isopentenyl diphosphate $\rightleftharpoons$ diphosphate + trans,trans-farnesyl diphosphate

Thus, the two substrates of this enzyme are geranyl diphosphate (a 10 carbon precursor) and isopentenyl diphosphate (a 5 carbon precursor) whereas its two products are diphosphate and trans,trans-farnesyl diphosphate (a 15 carbon product).

This enzyme belongs to the family of transferases, specifically those transferring aryl or alkyl groups other than methyl groups.

== Nomenclature ==
The systematic name of this enzyme class is geranyl-diphosphate:isopentenyl-diphosphate geranyltranstransferase. Other names in common use include:

- farnesyl-diphosphate synthase
- geranyl transferase I
- prenyltransferase
- farnesyl pyrophosphate synthetase
- farnesylpyrophosphate synthetase

Common abbreviations include: FPS, FDS, FPPS, and FDPS.

== Structure ==
The structure and mechanism of farnesyl pyrophosphate synthase (FPPS), a type of geranyltranstransferase, is well characterized. FPPS is a ~30 kDa Mg^{2+} dependent homodimeric enzyme that synthesizes (E, E)-farnesyl pyrophosphate in a successive manner from two equivalents of isopentenyl pyrophosphate (IPP) and dimethylallyl pyrophosphate (DMAPP).

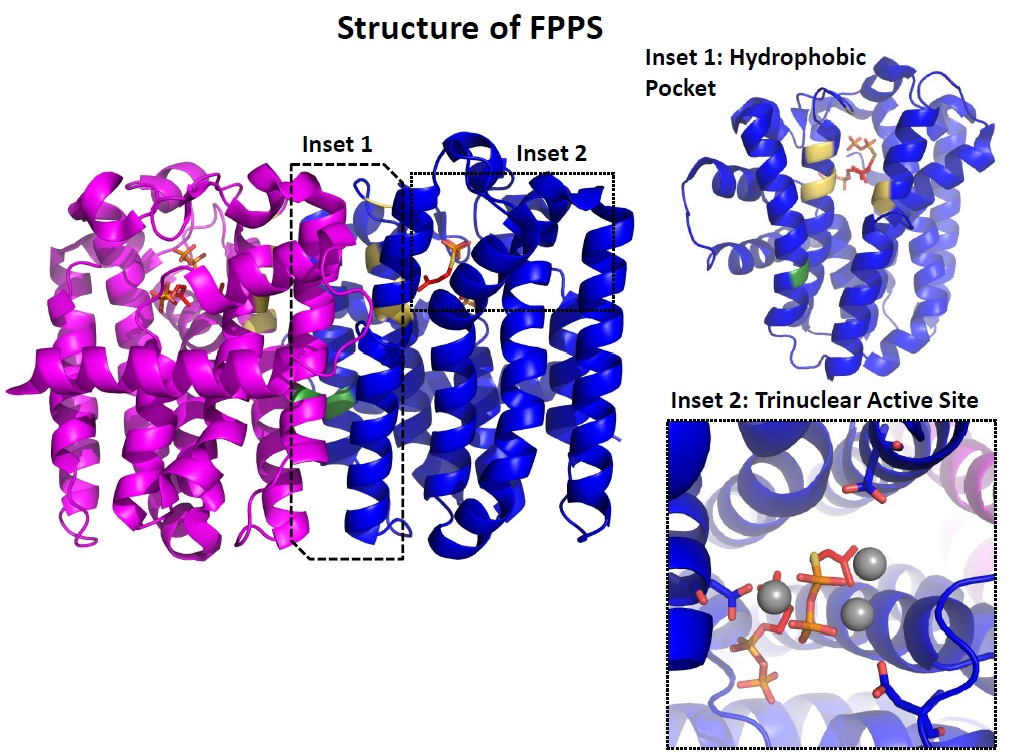
Crystal structure of the FPPS homodimer with IPP and DMAPP analogue, DMSPP (PDB ID: 1RQI). Monomers are shown in magenta and dark blue. Residues in hydrophobic pocket are highlighted in yellow. The base of the pocket is formed by the residue in green (a phenylalanine). A 90 degree rotated monomer structure is shown in Inset 1 to highlight the hydrophobic pocket. A top view of the active site is shown in Inset 2 along with the aspartate mediated trinuclear Mg^{2+} (silver spheres) catalytic center. Images generated in PyMOL.

FPPS adopts a 3-layered α-helical fold characteristic of many prenyltransferases with 11 helices and flexible loops in between. The centrally located helices (α4 and α8) contain conserved aspartate motifs (DDXXD) that participate in substrate binding and catalysis. Motif aspartate residues, water oxygens, and pyrophosphate coordinate three Mg^{2+}in an octahedral manner. The trinuclear Mg^{2+} complex is critical for binding DMAPP and stabilizing the pyrophosphate leaving group while the growing hydrocarbon tail wedges into a deep hydrophobic pocket. Site-directed mutagenesis studies have shown that the ultimate length of the isoprenoid product is determined by bulky residues (often phenyalanine) at the hydrophobic pocket's base.

== Mechanism ==
From crystal structures and kinetic assays, it is believed that FPPS catalyzes the condensation reaction in three concerted steps: (1) Ionization, (2) Condensation, and (3) Elimination.

In the first step, three Mg^{2+}stabilize the anionic leaving group, pyrophosphate, on dimethylallyl pyrophosphate (DMAPP). The loss of pyrophosphate forms dimethylallyl cation. In the second step, the reactive C3-C5 double bond in isopentyl pyrophosphate (IPP) performs a nucleophilic attack on the previously formed dimethylallyl cation. The final step involves pyrophosphate held in the trinuclear Mg^{2+} center acting as a catalytic base in an elimination reaction to form geranyl pyrophosphate. A second consecutive round of geranyl pyrophosphate ionization, condensation with IPP, and elimination forms farnesyl pyrophosphate.

== Function ==
Geranyltranstransferases are an evolutionarily conserved class of enzymes in Archaea, Bacteria, and Eukarya that participate in a broad range of biosynthetic pathways including those of cholesterol, porphyrin, carotenoids, ubiquinone, and isoprenoids. Various studies have located FPPS in chloroplasts, mitochondria, cytosol, and peroxisomes.

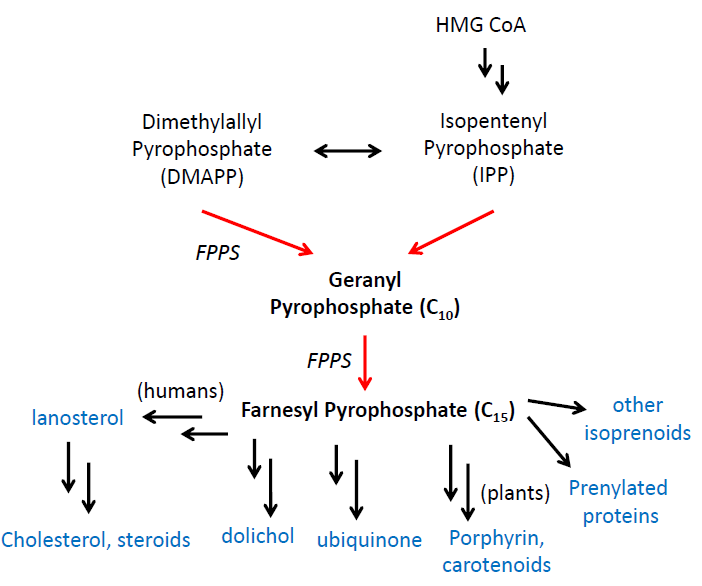
FPPS, a geranyltranstransferase, catalyzes reactions (shown with red arrows) central to many biosynthetic pathways.

In cholesterol synthesis, the product, farnesyl pyrophosphate, is consumed in a reductive tail-to-tail condensation with another farnesyl pyrophosphate to form a 30-carbon compound called squalene by squalene synthase. Through several more biosynthetic steps, squalene is transformed into lanosterol, a direct precursor for cholesterol. Notably, sterols control FPPS expression through two cis regulatory factors (an inverted CAAT box and SRE-3) in the proximal FPPS promoter. In plants, porphyrin and carotenoids constitute accessory pigments that help capture light in the photosystems. Ubiquinone is a key electron carrier in the electron transport chain of cellular respiration. Isoprenoids are a large group of compounds that serve as biosynthetic precursors for lipids and hormones.

Farnesyl and geranyl pyrophosphate also serve as precursors for prenylated proteins. Prenylation is a common type of covalent post-translational modification at C-terminal CaaX motifs that allows proteins to localize to membranes or bind to one another. A notable example of the former is the farnesylation of small G-proteins including Ras, CDC42, Rho, and Rac. The attachment of a hydrophobic aliphatic chain as those present in farnesyl or geranylgeranyl groups allows small G-proteins to tether from membranes and carry out effector functions.

== Drug targeting ==
FPPS is the target of bisphosphonate drugs such as Fosamax (alendronate) and Actonel (risedronate). Bisphosphonate drugs are commonly prescribed for bone diseases including Paget’s disease, osteolytic metastases, and post-menopausal osteoporosis. Bisphosphonate drugs help maintain bone tissue in osteoporotic patients and reduce blood calcium levels in hypercalcemic patients by inhibiting FPPS in bone-reabsorbing osteoclasts. An FPPS-IPP-risedronate ternary complex demonstrated that risedronate binds to the trinuclear Mg^{2+} complex and interacts with the hydrophobic pocket in a manner similar to DMAPP.
