= TRIT1 =

Protein-coding gene in humans

Identifiers
- Aliases: TRIT1, IPT, MOD5, GRO1, IPPT, IPTase, hGRO1, tRNA isopentenyltransferase 1, COXPD35
- External IDs: OMIM: 617840; MGI: 1914216; GeneCards: TRIT1
Enzyme activity
EC #	BRENDA	ExPASy	KEGG	MetaCyc
2.5.1.75	↗	↗	↗	↗

Gene location (Human)
Chr.	Chromosome 1 (human)
Band	1p34.2	Start	39,838,110 bp
Band	1p34.2	End	39,883,511 bp

Gene location (Mouse)
Chr.	Chromosome 4 (mouse)
Band	4|4 D2.2	Start	122,910,390 bp
Band	4|4 D2.2	End	122,948,742 bp
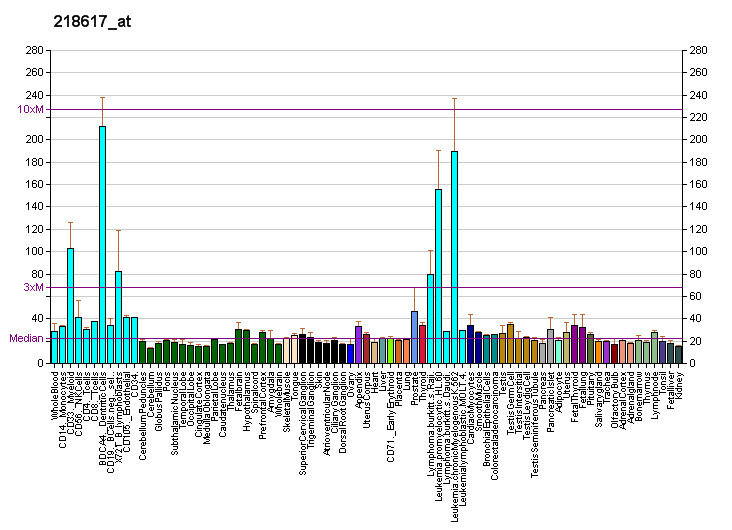
RNA expression pattern
Bgee	Human / Mouse (ortholog); Top expressed in: oocyte; body of pancreas; skin of leg; vagina; skin of abdomen; right uterine tube; secondary oocyte; left lobe of thyroid gland; prostate; body of uterus / Top expressed in: saccule; medullary collecting duct; otic vesicle; renal corpuscle; otic placode; lacrimal gland; hair follicle; cumulus cell; primary oocyte; fossa; More reference expression data
BioGPS	More reference expression data
Gene ontology
Molecular function	transferase activity; nucleotide binding; ATP binding; metal ion binding; tRNA dimethylallyltransferase activity; nucleic acid binding; zinc ion binding
Cellular component	cytoplasm; mitochondrial matrix; mitochondrion; cellular component
Biological process	mitochondrial tRNA modification; tRNA processing; tRNA modification
Sources:Amigo / QuickGO
Orthologs
Databases	NCBI: entry; OMA: entry
Species	Human	Mouse
Entrez	54802	66966
Ensembl	ENSG00000043514	ENSMUSG00000028653
UniProt	Q9H3H1	Q80UN9
RefSeq (mRNA)	NM_001312691; NM_001312692; NM_017646	NM_025873
RefSeq (protein)	NP_001299620; NP_001299621; NP_060116	NP_080149
Location (UCSC)	Chr 1: 39.84 – 39.88 Mb	Chr 4: 122.91 – 122.95 Mb
PubMed search
- Wikidata
View/Edit Human	View/Edit Mouse

tRNA dimethylallyltransferase is an enzyme that in humans is encoded by the TRIT1 gene.

It catalyzes the addition of an isopentenyl group from dimethylallyl diphosphate (DMAPP) onto adenosine residue 37 of certain tRNA molecules.
