= DXP reductoisomerase =

InterPro Family

1-deoxy-D-xylulose-5-phosphate reductoisomerase
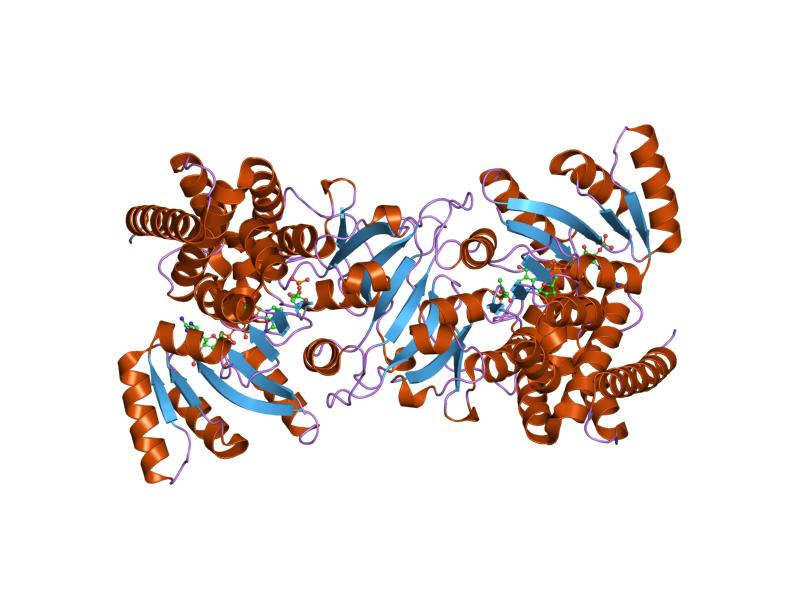
- crystal structure of DXR in complex with the substrate 1-deoxy-D-xylulose 5-phosphate

Identifiers
- Symbol: DXP_reductoisom
- Pfam: PF02670
- Pfam clan: CL0063
- InterPro: IPR013512
- SCOP2: 1onn / SCOPe / SUPFAM
Available protein structures:
- PDB: IPR013512 PF02670 (ECOD; PDBsum)
- AlphaFold: IPR013512; PF02670

DXP reductoisomerase

Identifiers
- EC no.: 1.1.1.267
- CAS no.: 210756-42-6

Databases
- BRENDA: enzyme data
- ExPASy: NiceZyme view
- KEGG: enzyme entry
- MetaCyc: metabolic pathway
- Rhea: reactions
- PDB structures: RCSB PDB PDBe PDBsum
Search
- PMC: articles
- PubMed: articles
- NCBI: proteins

DXP reductoisomerase (1-deoxy-D-xylulose 5-phosphate reductoisomerase or DXR) is an enzyme that interconverts 1-deoxy-D-xylulose 5-phosphate (DXP) and 2-C-methyl-D-erythritol 4-phosphate (MEP).

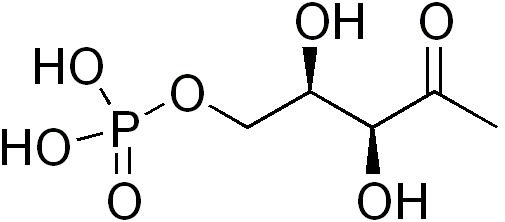
DXP
+ NADPH
H^{+}
H^{+}
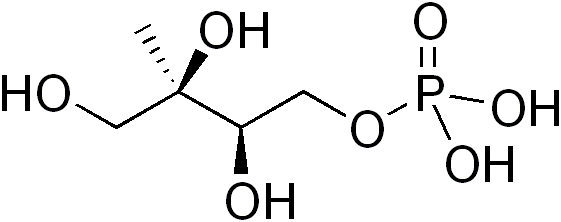
MEP
+ NADP^{+}

It is classified under EC 1.1.1.267. It is normally abbreviated DXR, but it is sometimes named IspC, as the product of the ispC gene.

DXR is part of the MEP pathway (nonmevalonate pathway) of isoprenoid precursor biosynthesis. DXR is inhibited by fosmidomycin.

This enzyme is required for terpenoid biosynthesis in some organisms, since it is a key enzyme on the MEP pathway for the production of the isoprenoid precursors IPP and DMAPP. In Arabidopsis thaliana 1-deoxy-D-xylulose 5-phosphate reductoisomerase is the first committed enzyme of the MEP pathway for isoprenoid precursor biosynthesis. The enzyme requires Mn^{2+}, Co^{2+} or Mg^{2+} for activity, with Mn^{2+} being most effective.
