= ISPS =

ISPS may refer to:

- Isoprene synthase, an enzyme
- International Ship and Port Facility Security Code
- International Sports Promotion Society
