= 2-C-methyl-D-erythritol 4-phosphate cytidylyltransferase =

Class of enzymes

Identifiers
- EC no.: 2.7.7.60
- CAS no.: 251990-59-7

Databases
- BRENDA: enzyme data
- ExPASy: NiceZyme view
- KEGG: enzyme entry
- MetaCyc: metabolic pathway
- Rhea: reactions
- PDB structures: RCSB PDB PDBe PDBsum
- Gene Ontology: AmiGO / QuickGO
Search
- PMC: articles
- PubMed: articles
- NCBI: proteins

IspD
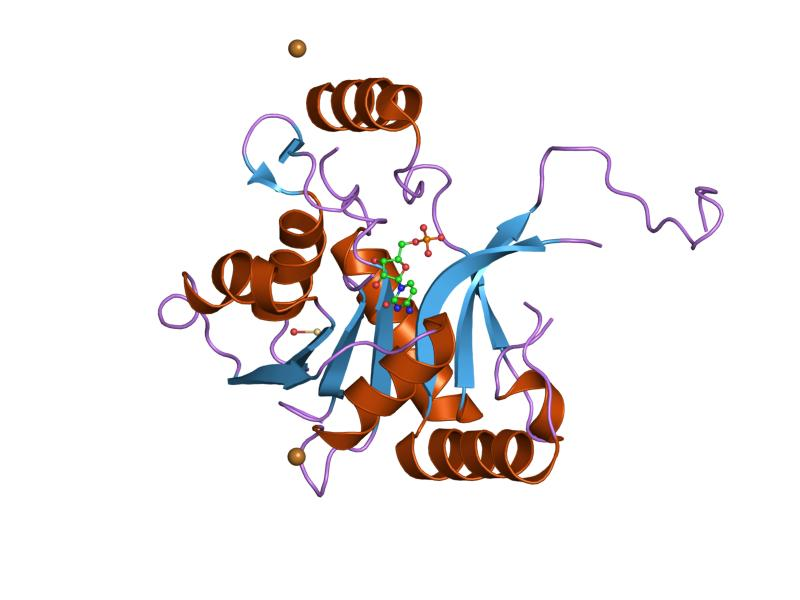
- 2-C-methyl-D-erythritol 4-phosphate cytidylyltransferase (IspD) from Arabidopsis thaliana

Identifiers
- Symbol: IspD
- Pfam: PF01128
- Pfam clan: CL0110
- InterPro: IPR001228
- PROSITE: PDOC00997
- SCOP2: 1inj / SCOPe / SUPFAM
Available protein structures:
- PDB: IPR001228 PF01128 (ECOD; PDBsum)
- AlphaFold: IPR001228; PF01128

2-C-methyl-D-erythritol 4-phosphate cytidylyltransferase (EC 2.7.7.60) is an enzyme that catalyzes the chemical reaction:

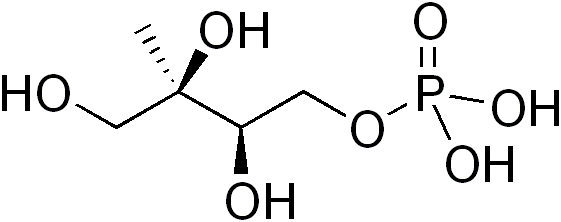
2-C-methylerythritol 4-phosphate
+
cytidine triphosphate
PP_{i}
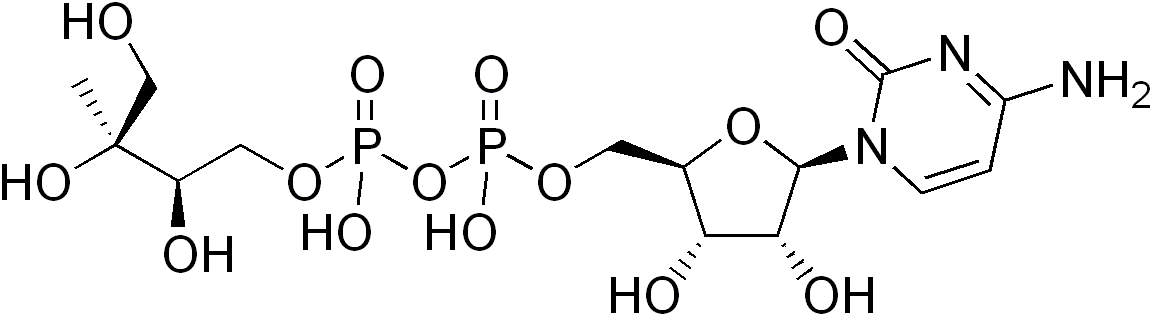
CDP-ME

The enzyme has been characterised in Escherichia coli and Arabidopsis thaliana. The reaction is the third step of the MEP pathway to terpenes; the formation of CDP-ME (4-diphosphocytidyl-2C-methylerythritol) from cytidine triphosphate and 2C-methyl-D-erythritol 4-phosphate (MEP). The isoprenoid pathway is a well known target for anti-infective drug development.

== Nomenclature ==
This enzyme is a transferase, specifically one transferring phosphorus-containing nucleotide groups (nucleotidyltransferases). Its systematic name is CTP:2-C-methyl-D-erythritol 4-phosphate cytidylyltransferase and it is also called MEP cytidylyltransferase or CDP-ME synthetase.

It is normally abbreviated IspD and referenced by the open reading frame YgbP.

== Structural studies ==
The crystal structure of the Escherichia coli 2-C-methyl-D-erythritol 4-phosphate cytidylyltransferase PDB: 1I52, PDB: 1INI & PDB: 1INJ, reported by Richard et al. (2001), was the first one for an enzyme involved in the MEP pathway.

As of February 2010, 13 other structures have been solved for this class of enzymes, with PDB accession codes PDB: 1H3M, PDB: 1VGT, PDB: 1VGU, PDB: 1VGZ, PDB: 1VPA, PDB: 1VGW, PDB: 1W55, PDB: 1W57, PDB: 1W77,PDB: 2PX7, PDB: 2VSI, PDB: 3F1C and PDB: 2VSH.
