= Trans,polycis-decaprenyl diphosphate synthase =

Class of enzymes

Identifiers
- EC no.: 2.5.1.86

Databases
- IntEnz: IntEnz view
- BRENDA: BRENDA entry
- ExPASy: NiceZyme view
- KEGG: KEGG entry
- MetaCyc: metabolic pathway
- PRIAM: profile
- PDB structures: RCSB PDB PDBe PDBsum
Search
- PMC: articles
- PubMed: articles
- NCBI: proteins

Trans,polycis-decaprenyl diphosphate synthase (EC 2.5.1.86, Rv2361c, (2Z,6Z,10Z,14Z,18Z,22Z,26Z,30Z,34E)-decaprenyl diphosphate synthase) is an enzyme with systematic name (2Z,6E)-farnesyl-diphosphate:isopentenyl-diphosphate farnesylcistransferase (adding 7 isopentenyl units) . This enzyme catalyses the following chemical reaction

(2Z,6E)-farnesyl diphosphate + 7 isopentenyl diphosphate $\rightleftharpoons$ 7 diphosphate + trans,octacis-decaprenyl diphosphate

The enzyme is involved in the biosynthesis of decaprenyl phosphate.
