= 4-Hydroxy-3-methylbut-2-enyl diphosphate reductase =

InterPro Family

Identifiers
- EC no.: 1.17.7.4
- CAS no.: 512789-14-9

Databases
- IntEnz: IntEnz view
- BRENDA: BRENDA entry
- ExPASy: NiceZyme view
- KEGG: KEGG entry
- MetaCyc: metabolic pathway
- PRIAM: profile
- PDB structures: RCSB PDB PDBe PDBsum
Search
- PMC: articles
- PubMed: articles
- NCBI: proteins

4-Hydroxy-3-methylbut-2-enyl diphosphate reductase (EC 1.17.7.4, isopentenyl-diphosphate:NADP+ oxidoreductase, LytB, (E)-4-hydroxy-3-methylbut-2-en-1-yl diphosphate reductase, HMBPP reductase, IspH, LytB/IspH) is an enzyme in the non-mevalonate pathway. It acts on (E)-4-hydroxy-3-methyl-but-2-enyl pyrophosphate (HMB-PP).

The enzyme characterised from Zymomonas mobilis and Plasmodium falciparum gives a mixture of dimethylallyl pyrophosphate and isopentenyl pyrophosphate in the ratio of five to one.

HMB-PP
+ 2 reduced
ferredoxin
2 H^{+}
H_{2}O
dimethylallyl pyrophosphate
+ 2 oxidised
ferredoxin
HMB-PP
+ 2 reduced
ferredoxin
2 H^{+}
H_{2}O
isopentenyl pyrophosphate
+ 2 oxidised
ferredoxin

4-Hydroxy-3-methylbut-2-enyl diphosphate reductase is an iron-sulfur protein that contains an unusual [4Fe-4S] cluster.
