= Lavandulyl diphosphate synthase =

Class of enzymes

Identifiers
- EC no.: 2.5.1.69

Databases
- IntEnz: IntEnz view
- BRENDA: BRENDA entry
- ExPASy: NiceZyme view
- KEGG: KEGG entry
- MetaCyc: metabolic pathway
- PRIAM: profile
- PDB structures: RCSB PDB PDBe PDBsum
Search
- PMC: articles
- PubMed: articles
- NCBI: proteins

In enzymology, a lavandulyl diphosphate synthase (EC 2.5.1.69) is an enzyme that catalyzes the chemical reaction

2 dimethylallyl diphosphate $\rightleftharpoons$ diphosphate + lavandulyl diphosphate

Hence, this enzyme has one substrate, dimethylallyl diphosphate, and two products, diphosphate and lavandulyl diphosphate.

This enzyme belongs to the family of transferases, specifically those transferring aryl or alkyl groups other than methyl groups. The systematic name of this enzyme class is dimethylallyl-diphosphate:dimethylallyl-diphosphate dimethylallyltransferase (lavandulyl-diphosphate-forming). This enzyme is also called FDS-5.
