= Trans,polycis-polyprenyl diphosphate synthase ((2Z,6E)-farnesyl diphosphate specific) =

Identifiers
- EC no.: 2.5.1.88

Databases
- IntEnz: IntEnz view
- BRENDA: BRENDA entry
- ExPASy: NiceZyme view
- KEGG: KEGG entry
- MetaCyc: metabolic pathway
- PRIAM: profile
- PDB structures: RCSB PDB PDBe PDBsum
Search
- PMC: articles
- PubMed: articles
- NCBI: proteins

Trans,polycis-polyprenyl diphosphate synthase ((2Z,6E)-farnesyl diphosphate specific) (EC 2.5.1.88) is an enzyme with systematic name (2Z,6E)-farnesyl-diphosphate:isopentenyl-diphosphate cistransferase (adding 9--11 isopentenyl units). This enzyme catalyses the following chemical reaction

(2Z,6E)-farnesyl diphosphate + n isopentenyl diphosphate $\rightleftharpoons$ n diphosphate + trans,polycis-polyprenyl diphosphate (n = 9 - 11)

This enzyme has the highest activity with (2Z,6E)-farnesyl diphosphate as allylic substrate.
