= ISPC =

ISPC may refer to:

- International Signalling Point code, a unique address for a node (SS7)
- Isoprene synthase, an enzyme
- Intel SPMD Program Compiler
