= Rubber cis-polyprenylcistransferase =

Class of enzymes

rubber cis-polyprenylcistransferase

Identifiers
- EC no.: 2.5.1.20
- CAS no.: 62213-41-6

Databases
- IntEnz: IntEnz view
- BRENDA: BRENDA entry
- ExPASy: NiceZyme view
- KEGG: KEGG entry
- MetaCyc: metabolic pathway
- PRIAM: profile
- PDB structures: RCSB PDB PDBe PDBsum
- Gene Ontology: AmiGO / QuickGO
Search
- PMC: articles
- PubMed: articles
- NCBI: proteins

In enzymology, a rubber cis-polyprenylcistransferase (EC 2.5.1.20) is an enzyme that catalyzes the chemical reaction

poly-cis-polyprenyl diphosphate + isopentenyl diphosphate $\rightleftharpoons$ diphosphate + a poly-cis-polyprenyl diphosphate longer by one C_{5} unit

Thus, the two substrates of this enzyme are poly-cis-polyprenyl diphosphate and isopentenyl diphosphate, whereas its two products are diphosphate and poly-cis-polyprenyl diphosphate longer by one C5 unit.

This enzyme belongs to the family of transferases, specifically those transferring aryl or alkyl groups other than methyl groups. The systematic name of this enzyme class is poly-cis-polyprenyl-diphosphate:isopentenyl-diphosphate polyprenylcistransferase. Other names in common use include rubber allyltransferase, rubber transferase, isopentenyl pyrophosphate cis-1,4-polyisoprenyl transferase, cis-prenyl transferase, rubber polymerase, and rubber prenyltransferase. This enzyme participates in biosynthesis of steroids.
