= 2-C-Methylerythritol 4-phosphate =

2-C-Methyl-D-erythritol 4-phosphate
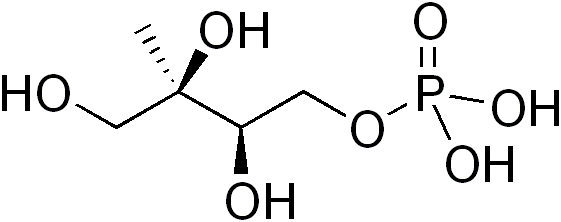

Names
- IUPAC name 2-C-Methyl-D-erythritol 4-(dihydrogen phosphate)
- Systematic IUPAC name (2R,3S)-2,3,4-Trihydroxy-3-methylbutyl dihydrogen phosphate
- Other names 2-C-Methylerythritol 4-phosphate Methyl-D-erythritol phosphate

Identifiers
CAS Number	206440-72-4
3D model (JSmol)	Interactive image
Abbreviations	MEP
ChEBI	CHEBI:58262
ChemSpider	10246067
PubChem CID	443198
CompTox Dashboard (EPA)	DTXSID90332064
- InChI: InChI=1S/C5H13O7P/c1-5(8,3-6)4(7)2-12-13(9,10)11/h4,6-8H,2-3H2,1H3,(H2,9,10,11)/p-2/t4-,5+/m1/s1 Key: XMWHRVNVKDKBRG-UHNVWZDZSA-L
- SMILES: CC(CO)(C(COP(=O)(O)O)O)O

Properties
Chemical formula	C_{5}H_{13}O_{7}P
Molar mass	216.126
- Except where otherwise noted, data are given for materials in their standard state (at 25 °C [77 °F], 100 kPa). verify (what is ?) Infobox references

2-C-Methyl-D-erythritol 4-phosphate (MEP) is an intermediate on the MEP pathway (non-mevalonate pathway) of isoprenoid precursor biosynthesis. It is the first committed metabolite on that pathway on the route to IPP and DMAPP.

== See also ==
- DXP reductoisomerase
- MEP pathway (formerly known as the non-mevalonate pathway)
- Fosmidomycin
