= Fosmidomycin =

Chemical compound

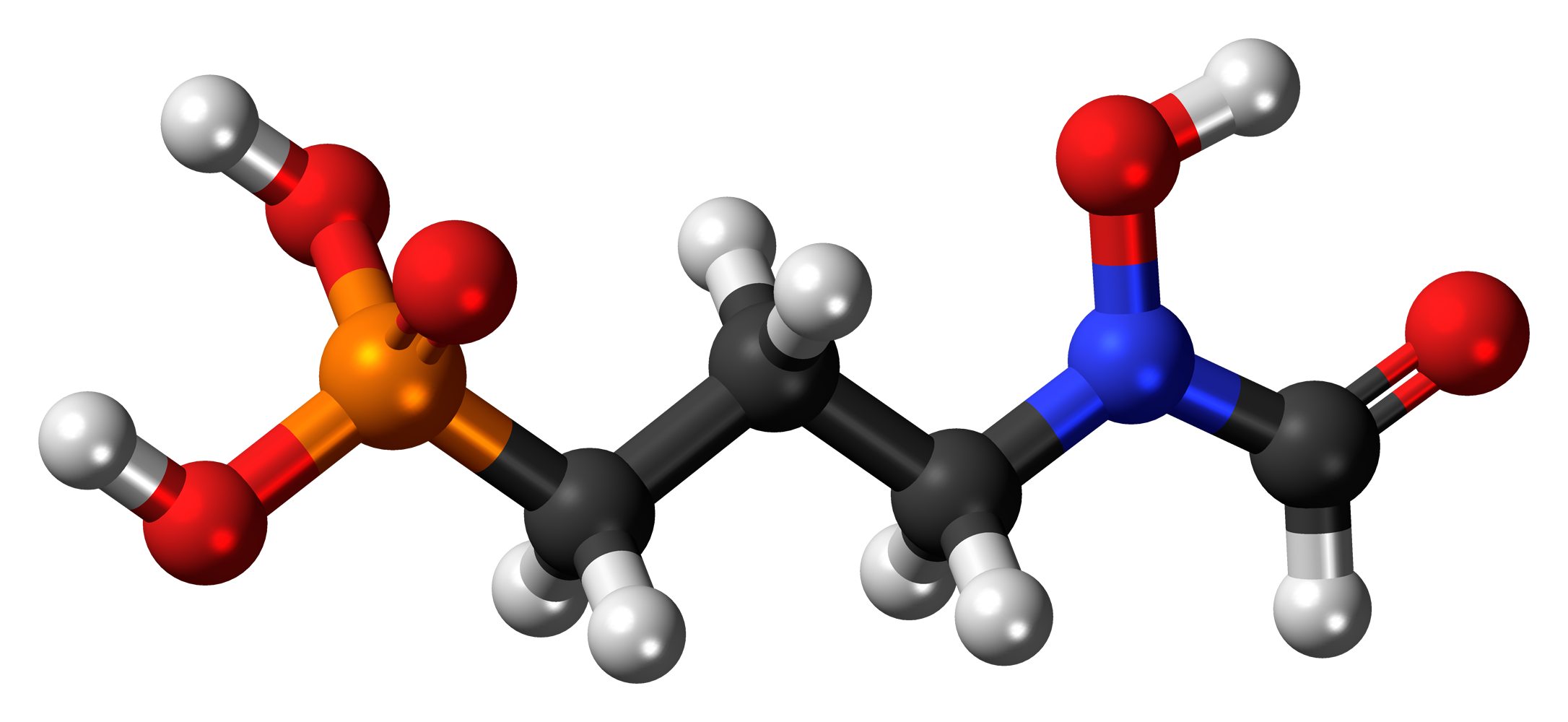

Clinical data
- ATC code: none

Identifiers
- IUPAC name: 3-[Formyl(hydroxy)amino]propylphosphonic acid
- CAS Number: 66508-53-0
- PubChem CID: 572
- DrugBank: DB02948
- ChemSpider: 555
- UNII: 5829E3D9I9
- ChEBI: CHEBI:443725
- ChEMBL: ChEMBL203125
- CompTox Dashboard (EPA): DTXSID70216712

Chemical and physical data
- Formula: C_{4}H_{10}NO_{5}P
- Molar mass: 183.100 g·mol^{−1}
- 3D model (JSmol): Interactive image
- SMILES: O=P(O)(O)CCCN(O)C=O
- InChI: InChI=1S/C4H10NO5P/c6-4-5(7)2-1-3-11(8,9)10/h4,7H,1-3H2,(H2,8,9,10); Key:GJXWDTUCERCKIX-UHFFFAOYSA-N

Fosmidomycin is an antibiotic that was originally isolated from culture broths of bacteria of the genus Streptomyces. It specifically inhibits DXP reductoisomerase, a key enzyme in the non-mevalonate pathway of isoprenoid biosynthesis. It is a structural analogue of 2-C-methyl-D-erythrose 4-phosphate. It inhibits the E. coli enzyme with a KI value of 38 nM (4), MTB at 80 nM, and the Francisella enzyme at 99 nM. Several mutations in the E. coli DXP reductoisomerase were found to confer resistance to fosmidomycin.

== Use in malaria ==
The discovery of the non-mevalonate pathway in malaria parasites has indicated the use of fosmidomycin and other such inhibitors as antimalarial drugs. Indeed, fosmidomycin has been tested in combination treatment with clindamycin for treatment of malaria with favorable results. It has been shown that an increase in copy number of the target enzyme (DXP reductoisomerase) correlates with in vitro fosmidomycin resistance in the lethal malaria parasite, Plasmodium falciparum.
