= 1-deoxy-D-xylulose-5-phosphate synthase =

Class of enzymes

1-deoxy-d-xylulose-5-phosphate synthase

Identifiers
- EC no.: 2.2.1.7
- CAS no.: 202218-79-9

Databases
- IntEnz: IntEnz view
- BRENDA: BRENDA entry
- ExPASy: NiceZyme view
- KEGG: KEGG entry
- MetaCyc: metabolic pathway
- PRIAM: profile
- PDB structures: RCSB PDB PDBe PDBsum
- Gene Ontology: AmiGO / QuickGO
Search
- PMC: articles
- PubMed: articles
- NCBI: proteins

1-deoxy-d-xylulose-5-phosphate synthase (EC 2.2.1.7) is an enzyme in the non-mevalonate pathway that catalyzes the chemical reaction

Pyruvic acid
+
D-glyceraldehyde-3-phosphate
CO_{2}
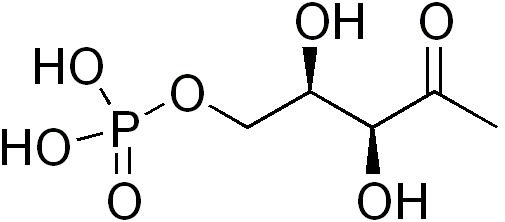
1-Deoxy-D-xylulose 5-phosphate

The two substrates of this enzyme are pyruvic acid and D-glyceraldehyde 3-phosphate. Its products are 1-deoxy-D-xylulose 5-phosphate and carbon dioxide. The enzyme has been characterised from Escherichia coli and a Streptomyces species.

It belongs to the family of transferases, specifically those transferring aldehyde or ketonic groups (transaldolases and transketolases, respectively). The systematic name of this enzyme class is pyruvate:d-glyceraldehyde-3-phosphate acetaldehydetransferase (decarboxylating). Other names in common use include 1-deoxy-d-xylulose-5-phosphate pyruvate-lyase (carboxylating), and DXP-synthase. The product of the enzyme goes on to form isopentenyl pyrophosphate which is part of the biosynthesis of steroids, and other compounds such as pyridoxol.

== Structural studies ==
As of late 2007, two structures have been solved for this class of enzymes, with PDB accession codes 2O1S and 2O1X.
