= Tryptophan dimethylallyltransferase =

Class of enzymes

Identifiers
- EC no.: 2.5.1.34
- CAS no.: 55127-01-0

Databases
- IntEnz: IntEnz view
- BRENDA: BRENDA entry
- ExPASy: NiceZyme view
- KEGG: KEGG entry
- MetaCyc: metabolic pathway
- PRIAM: profile
- PDB structures: RCSB PDB PDBe PDBsum
- Gene Ontology: AmiGO / QuickGO
Search
- PMC: articles
- PubMed: articles
- NCBI: proteins

Tryptophan dimethylallyltransferase (EC 2.5.1.34) is an enzyme that catalyzes the chemical reaction

tryptophan
+
dimethylallyl pyrophosphate
PP_{i}
4-(3-methylbut-2-enyl)-L-tryptophan

The two substrates of this enzyme characterised from ergot fungi are tryptophan and dimethylallyl pyrophosphate. Its products are 4-(3-methylbut-2-enyl)-L-tryptophan and pyrophosphate (PP_{i}). This is a step in the biosynthesis of ergot alkaloids.

This enzyme belongs to the family of transferases, specifically those transferring aryl or alkyl groups other than methyl groups. The systematic name of this enzyme class is dimethylallyl-diphosphate:L-tryptophan dimethylallyltransferase. Other names in common use include dimethylallylpyrophosphate:L-tryptophan dimethylallyltransferase, dimethylallyltryptophan synthetase, dimethylallylpyrophosphate:tryptophan dimethylallyl transferase, DMAT synthetase, and 4-(gamma,gamma-dimethylallyl)tryptophan synthase.
