= 4-hydroxy-3-methylbut-2-en-1-yl diphosphate synthase =

Class of enzymes

Identifiers
- EC no.: 1.17.7.1

Databases
- IntEnz: IntEnz view
- BRENDA: BRENDA entry
- ExPASy: NiceZyme view
- KEGG: KEGG entry
- MetaCyc: metabolic pathway
- PRIAM: profile
- PDB structures: RCSB PDB PDBe PDBsum
- Gene Ontology: AmiGO / QuickGO
Search
- PMC: articles
- PubMed: articles
- NCBI: proteins

4-hydroxy-3-methylbut-2-en-1-yl diphosphate synthase (HMB-PP synthase, IspG, EC 1.17.7.1) is an enzyme that catalyzes a redox reaction

MEcPP
+ 2 oxidised ferredoxin
H_{2}O
HMB-PP
+ 2 reduced ferredoxin

The substrate of this enzyme is 2-C-methyl-D-erythritol 2,4-cyclodiphosphate (MEcPP) and the product is (E)-4-hydroxy-3-methylbut-2-en-1-yl diphosphate (HMB-PP). Electrons are donated by two reduced ferredoxin proteins per reaction. The enzyme characterised from Thermosynechococcus elongatus contains an iron-sulfur cluster.

The reaction is part of the non-mevalonate pathway (MEP pathway) of isoprenoid precursor biosynthesis.

== Nomenclature ==
This enzyme is an oxidoreductase, specifically one acting on CH or CH_{2} groups with a disulfide as acceptor. The systematic name of this enzyme class is (E)-4-hydroxy-3-methylbut-2-en-1-yl-diphosphate:protein-disulfide oxidoreductase (hydrating).
