= Colegio Parque de España =

Spanish international school in Argentina

Information
- School type: International school
- Established: 1985; 41 years ago
- Affiliation: Centro Educativo Hispano Argentino

Colegio Internacional e Instituto Superior Parque de España (CIPE/ISPE) is a Spanish international school in Rosario, Argentina.

Students attending the school may earn two types of high school diplomas/sixth form certificates: an Argentine bachillerato (from the authorities of Santa Fe Province) and a Spanish bachillerato.

It began operations in 1985.

It is a part of the Centro Educativo Hispano Argentino (CEHA).
