= 4-(cytidine 5'-diphospho)-2-C-methyl-D-erythritol kinase =

InterPro Family

Identifiers
- EC no.: 2.7.1.148

Databases
- IntEnz: IntEnz view
- BRENDA: BRENDA entry
- ExPASy: NiceZyme view
- KEGG: KEGG entry
- MetaCyc: metabolic pathway
- PRIAM: profile
- PDB structures: RCSB PDB PDBe PDBsum
- Gene Ontology: AmiGO / QuickGO
Search
- PMC: articles
- PubMed: articles
- NCBI: proteins

4-(cytidine 5'-diphospho)-2-C-methyl-D-erythritol kinase (EC 2.7.1.148) is an enzyme that catalyzes the chemical reaction

ATP +
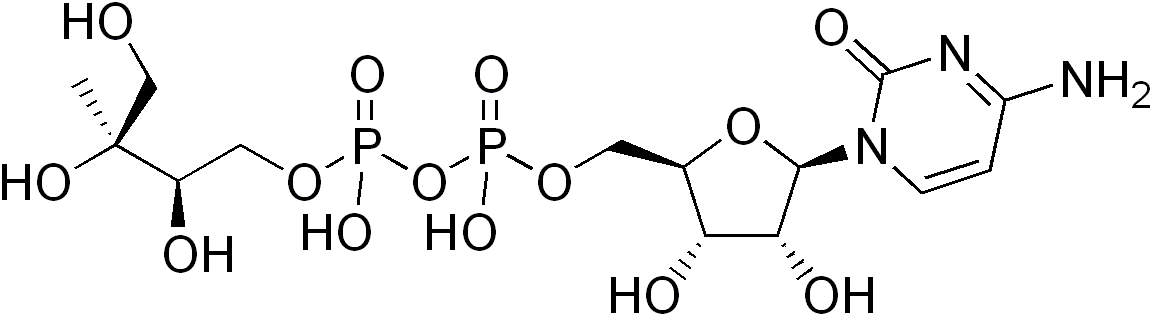
CDP-ME
ADP +
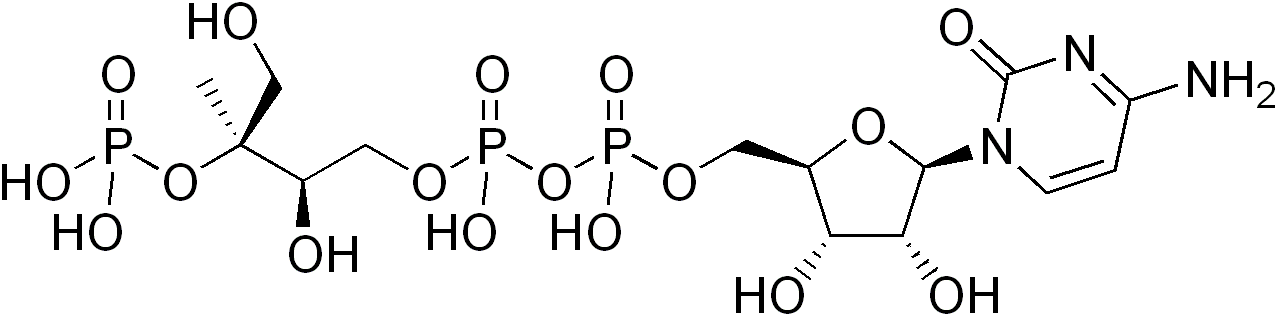
CDP-MEP

The enzyme characterised from Escherichia coli converts 4-diphosphocytidyl-2-C-methylerythritol (CDP-ME) to its 2-phosphate derivative, 4-diphosphocytidyl-2-C-methyl-D-erythritol 2-phosphate (CDP-MEP) by transferring a phosphate group from the cofactor, adenosine triphosphate (ATP), which is converted to adenosine diphosphate (ADP). The reaction is part of the non-mevalonate pathway to terpenes.

This enzyme is a transferase, specifically one transferring phosphorus-containing groups (phosphotransferases) with an alcohol group as acceptor. The systematic name of this enzyme class is ATP:4-(cytidine 5'-diphospho)-2-C-methyl-D-erythritol 2-phosphotransferase. This enzyme is also called CDP-ME kinase, and IspE.

== Structural studies ==
As of late 2007, 7 structures have been solved for this class of enzymes, with PDB accession codes PDB: 1OJ4, PDB: 1UEK, PDB: 2V2Q, PDB: 2V2V, PDB: 2V2Z, PDB: 2V34, and PDB: 2V8P.
