= 1-Deoxy-D-xylulose 5-phosphate =

1-Deoxy-d-xylulose 5-phosphate
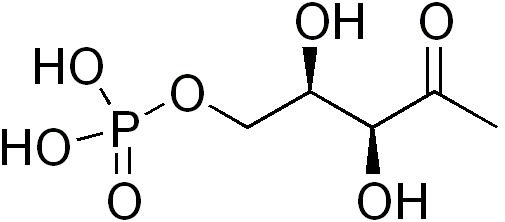

Names
- IUPAC name 1-Deoxy-D-xylulose 5-(dihydrogen phosphate)
- Systematic IUPAC name (2R,3S)-2,3-Dihydroxy-4-oxopentyl dihydrogen phosphate
- Other names DOXP

Identifiers
CAS Number	190079-18-6
3D model (JSmol)	Interactive image
ChEBI	CHEBI:16493
ChemSpider	391473
DrugBank	DB02496
KEGG	C11437
MeSH	1-deoxy-D-xylulose+5-phosphate
PubChem CID	443201
UNII	I4C288B3TN
CompTox Dashboard (EPA)	DTXSID90940547
- InChI: InChI=1S/C5H11O7P/c1-3(6)5(8)4(7)2-12-13(9,10)11/h4-5,7-8H,2H2,1H3,(H2,9,10,11)/t4-,5-/m1/s1 Key: AJPADPZSRRUGHI-RFZPGFLSSA-N; InChI=1/C5H11O7P/c1-3(6)5(8)4(7)2-12-13(9,10)11/h4-5,7-8H,2H2,1H3,(H2,9,10,11)/t4-,5-/m1/s1 Key: AJPADPZSRRUGHI-RFZPGFLSBQ
- SMILES: O=P(O)(O)OC[C@@H](O)[C@H](O)C(=O)C

Properties
Chemical formula	C_{5}H_{11}O_{7}P
Molar mass	214.11
- Except where otherwise noted, data are given for materials in their standard state (at 25 °C [77 °F], 100 kPa). verify (what is ?) Infobox references

1-Deoxy-d-xylulose 5-phosphate is a biosynthetic intermediate in the non-mevalonate pathway.

== Function ==
The enzyme involved in making 1-deoxy-d-xylulose 5-phosphate (DXP) is DXP synthase. The mechanism follows a catalysis of decarboxylative condensation of pyruvate and d-glyceraldehyde 3-phosphate to produce DXP. In addition, the molecule is involved in making thiamine (vitamin B_{1}) and pyridoxol (vitamin B_{6}).

The non-mevalonate pathway intermediate 1-deoxy-d-xylulose 5-phosphate (DXP) also acts as a precursor in making isoprenoids in many species such as bacteria, plants, and apicomplexan parasites, contributing to biological diversity.

== See also ==
- DXP reductoisomerase
- Terpenoid
