= (E)-4-Hydroxy-3-methyl-but-2-enyl pyrophosphate =

- Chemical structure of HMB-PP

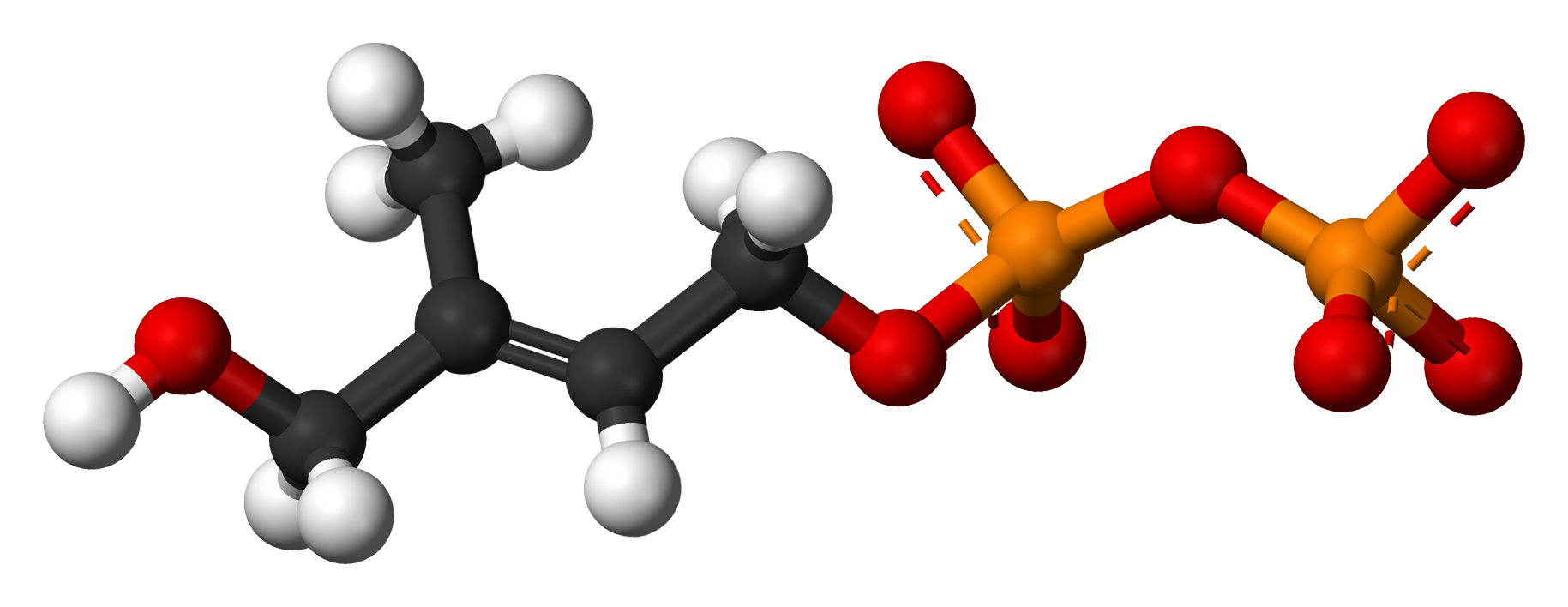
- Ball-and-stick model, shown here as a 3- ion

Names
- Preferred IUPAC name (2E)-4-Hydroxy-3-methylbut-2-en-1-yl trihydrogen diphosphate
- Other names (E)-4-hydroxy-dimethylallyl pyrophosphate HDMAPP (E)-4-Hydroxy-3-methyl-but-2-enyl diphosphate HMBDP

Identifiers
CAS Number	396726-03-7
3D model (JSmol)	Interactive image
ChEBI	CHEBI:15664
ChEMBL	ChEMBL145233
ChemSpider	4445244
KEGG	C11811
PubChem CID	5281976
- InChI: InChI=1S/C5H12O8P2/c1-5(4-6)2-3-12-15(10,11)13-14(7,8)9/h2,6H,3-4H2,1H3,(H,10,11)(H2,7,8,9)/b5-2+ Key: MDSIZRKJVDMQOQ-GORDUTHDSA-N
- SMILES: O=P(O)(O)OP(=O)(O)OCC=C(C)CO

Properties
Chemical formula	C_{5}H_{12}O_{8}P_{2}
Molar mass	262.091 g·mol^{−1}
- Except where otherwise noted, data are given for materials in their standard state (at 25 °C [77 °F], 100 kPa). Infobox references

(E)-4-Hydroxy-3-methyl-but-2-enyl pyrophosphate (HMBPP or HMB-PP) is an intermediate of the MEP pathway (non-mevalonate pathway) of isoprenoid biosynthesis. The enzyme HMB-PP synthase (GcpE, IspG) catalyzes the conversion of 2-C-methyl-D-erythritol 2,4-cyclodiphosphate (MEcPP) into HMB-PP. HMB-PP is then converted further to isopentenyl pyrophosphate (IPP) and dimethylallyl pyrophosphate (DMAPP) by HMB-PP reductase (LytB, IspH).

== Biochemical role ==
HMB-PP is an intermediate in the non-mevalonate pathway for the biosynthesis of the isoprenoid precursors isopentenyl pyrophosphate and dimethylallyl pyrophosphate. Most gram-negative bacteria, the photosynthetic cyanobacteria and green algae use only this pathway, while higher plants also use the mevalonate pathway.

The enzyme 4-hydroxy-3-methylbut-2-en-1-yl diphosphate synthase uses two reduced ferredoxin proteins per molecule of the precursor MEcPP to convert it to HMB-PP:

MEcPP
+ 2 oxidised ferredoxin
H_{2}O
HMB-PP
+ 2 reduced ferredoxin

The final step in the non-mevalonate pathway is carried out by the enzyme 4-hydroxy-3-methylbut-2-enyl diphosphate reductase, which gives a mixture of dimethylallyl pyrophosphate and isopentenyl pyrophosphate in the ratio of five to one.

HMB-PP +
2 reduced ferredoxin
2 H^{+}
H_{2}O
dimethylallyl pyrophosphate
+ 2 oxidised ferredoxin
HMB-PP +
2 reduced ferredoxin
2 H^{+}
H_{2}O
isopentenyl pyrophosphate
+ 2 oxidised ferredoxin

The products are then used in terpenoid biosynthesis.

HMB-PP is an essential metabolite in most pathogenic bacteria including Mycobacterium tuberculosis as well as in malaria parasites, but is absent from the human host.

HMB-PP is the physiological activator ("phosphoantigen") for human Vγ9/Vδ2 T cells, the major γδ T cell population in peripheral blood. With a bioactivity of 0.1 nM it is 10,000-10,000,000 times more potent than any other natural compound, such as IPP or alkyl amines. HMB-PP functions in this capacity by binding the B30.2 domain of BTN3A1.
