= TRGV9 =

Gene in the species Homo sapiens

Identifiers
- Aliases: TRGV9, TCRGV9, TRGC1, V2, T cell receptor gamma variable 9
- External IDs: GeneCards: TRGV9; OMA:TRGV9 - orthologs

Gene location (Human)
Chr.	Chromosome 7 (human)
Band	7p14.1	Start	38,317,017 bp
Band	7p14.1	End	38,318,861 bp
RNA expression pattern
Bgee	Human / Mouse (ortholog); Top expressed in: testicle; granulocyte; placenta; blood; bone marrow; spleen; lymph node; prostate; appendix; monocyte / n/a; More reference expression data
BioGPS	n/a
Orthologs
Species	Human	Mouse
Entrez	6983	n/a
Ensembl	ENSG00000211695	n/a
UniProt	n a	n/a
RefSeq (mRNA)	n/a	n/a
RefSeq (protein)	n/a	n/a
Location (UCSC)	Chr 7: 38.32 – 38.32 Mb	n/a
PubMed search		n/a
- Wikidata
View/Edit Human

T cell receptor gamma variable 9, also known as TRGV9, is a human gene.
