= YgbB N terminal protein domain =

YgbB
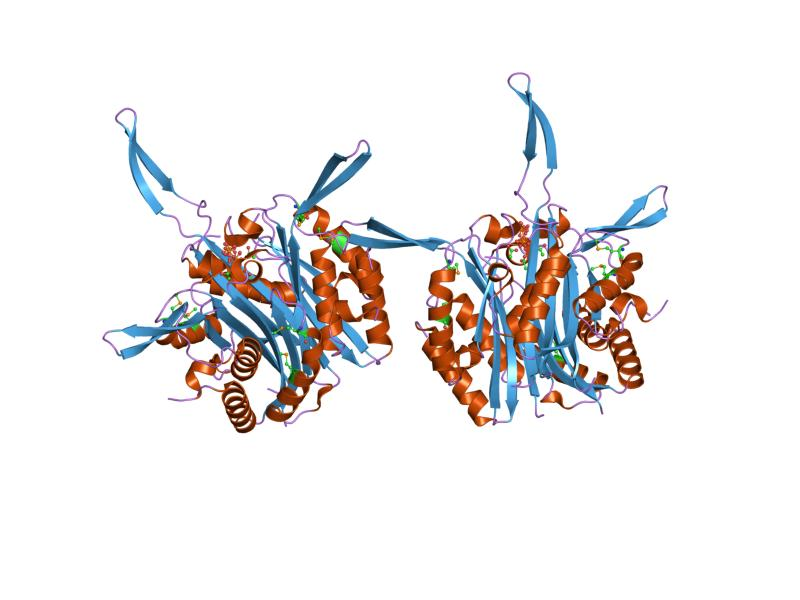
- crystal structure of a 2c-methyl-d-erythritol 2,4-cyclodiphosphate synthase

Identifiers
- Symbol: YgbB
- Pfam: PF02542
- InterPro: IPR003526
- SCOP2: 1iv1 / SCOPe / SUPFAM
- CDD: cd0554
Available protein structures:
- Pfam: structures / ECOD
- PDB: RCSB PDB; PDBe; PDBj
- PDBsum: structure summary

In molecular biology, YgbB is a protein domain. This entry makes reference to a number of proteins from eukaryotes and prokaryotes which share this common N-terminal signature and appear to be involved in terpenoid biosynthesis. The YgbB protein is a putative enzyme thought to aid terpenoid and isoprenoid biosynthesis, a vital chemical in all living organisms. This protein domain is part of an enzyme which catalyses a reaction in a complex pathway.

== Function ==
The YgbB protein domain has a main function of being involved in terpenoid and isoprenoid biosynthesis.

== Biochemistry ==
MECDP (2-C-methyl-D-erythritol 2,4-cyclodiphosphate) synthetase, an enzyme in the non-mevalonate pathway of isoprenoid synthesis, isoprenoids being essential in all organisms. Isoprenoids can also be synthesized through the mevalonate pathway. The non-mevolante route is used by many bacteria and human pathogens, including Mycobacterium tuberculosis and Plasmodium falciparum. This route appears to involve seven enzymes. MECDP synthetase catalyses the intramolecular attack by a phosphate group on a diphosphate, with cytidine monophosphate (CMP) acting as the leaving group to give the cyclic diphosphate product MEDCP. The enzyme is a trimer with three active sites shared between adjacent copies of the protein. The enzyme also has two metal binding sites, the metals playing key roles in catalysis.
