= Dimethylallyl pyrophosphate =

- Skeletal formula

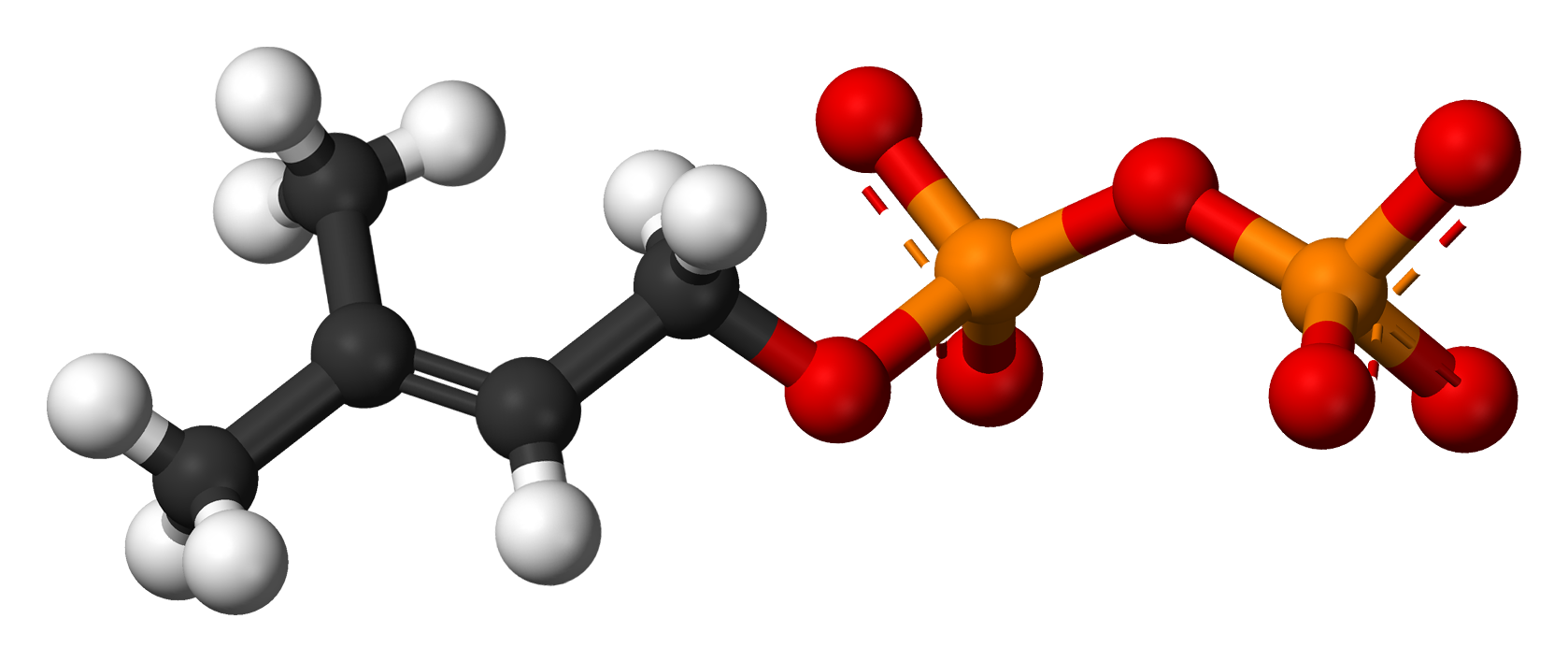
- Ball-and-stick model

Names
- IUPAC name 3-Methyl-2-buten-1-yl trihydrogen diphosphate
- Other names Dimethylallyl diphosphate; isoprenyl pyrophosphate; isoprenyl diphosphate

Identifiers
CAS Number	358-72-5
3D model (JSmol)	Interactive image
ChemSpider	627
MeSH	3,3-dimethylallyl+pyrophosphate
PubChem CID	647
CompTox Dashboard (EPA)	DTXSID70189331
- InChI: InChI=1S/C5H12O7P2/c1-5(2)3-4-11-14(9,10)12-13(6,7)8/h3H,4H2,1-2H3,(H,9,10)(H2,6,7,8) Key: CBIDRCWHNCKSTO-UHFFFAOYSA-N
- SMILES: CC(=CCOP(=O)(O)OP(=O)(O)O)C

Properties
Chemical formula	C_{5}H_{12}O_{7}P_{2}
Molar mass	246.092 g·mol^{−1}
- Except where otherwise noted, data are given for materials in their standard state (at 25 °C [77 °F], 100 kPa). verify (what is ?) Infobox references

Dimethylallyl pyrophosphate (DMAPP; or alternatively, dimethylallyl diphosphate (DMADP); also isoprenyl pyrophosphate) is an isoprenoid precursor. It is a product of both the mevalonate pathway and the MEP pathway of isoprenoid precursor biosynthesis. It is an isomer of isopentenyl pyrophosphate (IPP) and exists in virtually all life forms. The enzyme isopentenyl pyrophosphate isomerase catalyzes isomerization between DMAPP and IPP.

In the mevalonate pathway, DMAPP is synthesised from mevalonic acid. In contrast, DMAPP is synthesised from HMBPP in the MEP pathway.

At present, it is believed that there is crossover between the two pathways in organisms that use both pathways to create terpenes and terpenoids, such as in plants, and that DMAPP is the crossover product.

Mevalonate pathway

Simplified version of the steroid synthesis pathway with the intermediates isopentenyl pyrophosphate (IPP), dimethylallyl pyrophosphate (DMAPP), geranyl pyrophosphate (GPP) and squalene shown. Some intermediates are omitted.
