= Isopentenyl pyrophosphate =

- Skeletal formula of IPP

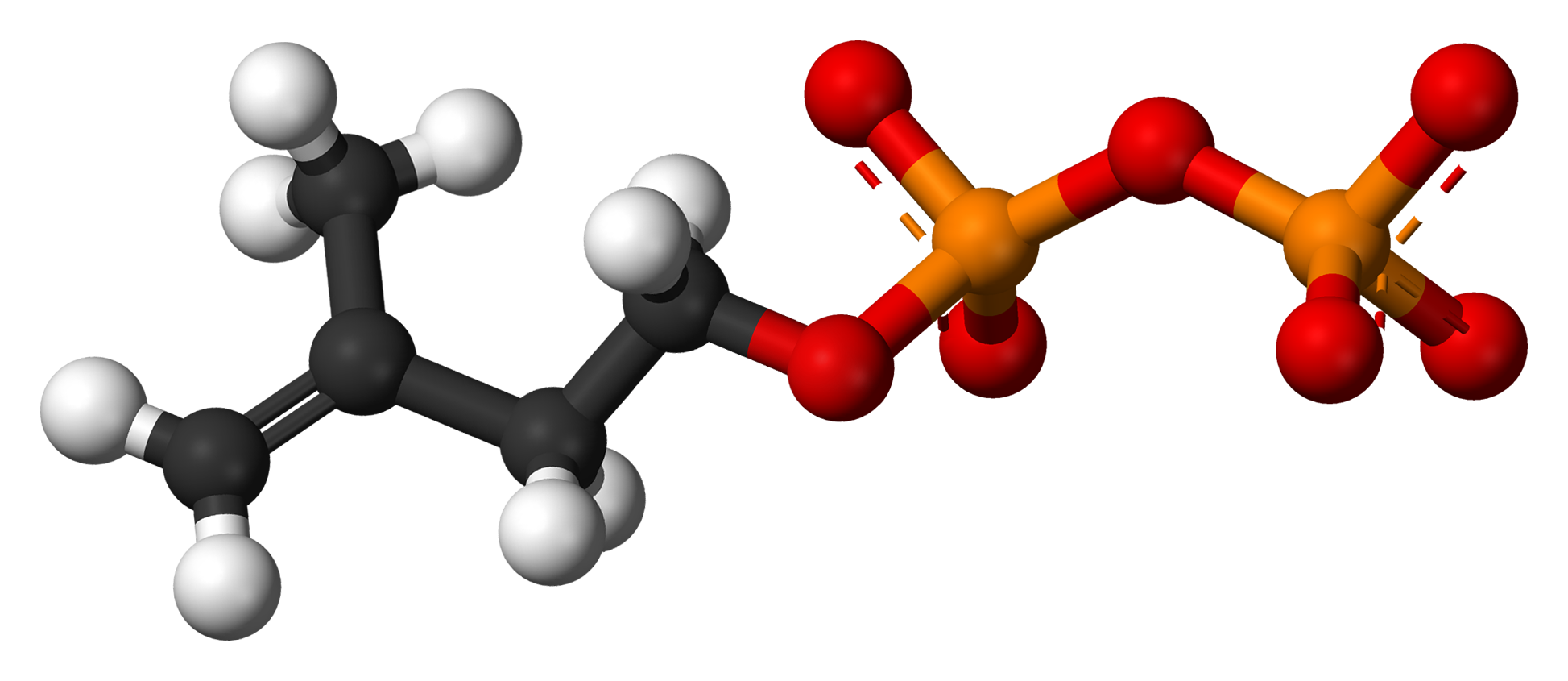
- Ball-and-stick model of IPP

Names
- IUPAC name (Hydroxy-(3-methylbut-3-enoxy) phosphoryl)oxyphosphonic acid

Identifiers
CAS Number	358-71-4
3D model (JSmol)	Interactive image
ChEBI	CHEBI:128769
ChemSpider	1158
MeSH	isopentenyl+pyrophosphate
PubChem CID	1195
UNII	LSC8849M7B
CompTox Dashboard (EPA)	DTXSID80861893
- InChI: InChI=1S/C5H12O7P2/c1-5(2)3-4-11-14(9,10)12-13(6,7)8/h1,3-4H2,2H3,(H,9,10)(H2,6,7,8) Key: NUHSROFQTUXZQQ-UHFFFAOYSA-N
- SMILES: CC(=C)CCOP(=O)(O)OP(=O)(O)O

Properties
Chemical formula	C_{5}H_{12}O_{7}P_{2}
Molar mass	246.092 g·mol^{−1}
- Except where otherwise noted, data are given for materials in their standard state (at 25 °C [77 °F], 100 kPa). verify (what is ?) Infobox references

Isopentenyl pyrophosphate (IPP, isopentenyl diphosphate, or IDP) is an isoprenoid precursor. IPP is an intermediate in the classical, HMG-CoA reductase pathway (commonly called the mevalonate pathway) and in the non-mevalonate MEP pathway of isoprenoid precursor biosynthesis. Isoprenoid precursors such as IPP, and its isomer DMAPP, are used by organisms in the biosynthesis of terpenes and terpenoids.

== Biosynthesis ==
IPP is formed from acetyl-CoA via the mevalonate pathway (the "upstream" part), and then is isomerized to dimethylallyl pyrophosphate by the enzyme isopentenyl pyrophosphate isomerase.

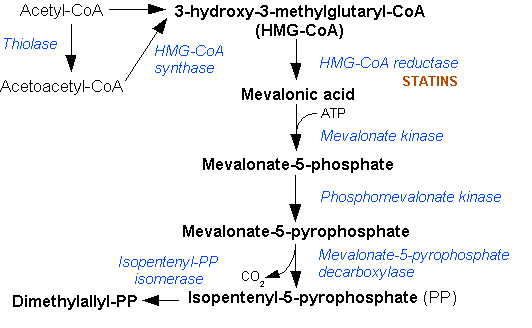
Mevalonate pathway

Simplified version of the steroid synthesis pathway with the intermediates isopentenyl pyrophosphate (IPP), dimethylallyl pyrophosphate (DMAPP), geranyl pyrophosphate (GPP) and squalene. Some intermediates are omitted. The color scheme does not correctly represent the origins of the isoprene units of GPP.

IPP can be synthesised via an alternative non-mevalonate pathway of isoprenoid precursor biosynthesis, the MEP pathway, where it is formed from (E)-4-hydroxy-3-methyl-but-2-enyl pyrophosphate (HMB-PP) by the enzyme HMB-PP reductase (LytB, IspH). The MEP pathway is present in many bacteria, apicomplexan protozoa such as malaria parasites, and in the plastids of higher plants.

== See also ==
- Dimethylallyltranstransferase
