= L-threonine kinase =

Identifiers
- EC no.: 2.7.1.177

Databases
- IntEnz: IntEnz view
- BRENDA: BRENDA entry
- ExPASy: NiceZyme view
- KEGG: KEGG entry
- MetaCyc: metabolic pathway
- PRIAM: profile
- PDB structures: RCSB PDB PDBe PDBsum
Search
- PMC: articles
- PubMed: articles
- NCBI: proteins

L-threonine kinase (EC 2.7.1.177, PduX) is an enzyme with systematic name ATP:L-threonine O3-phosphotransferase. This enzyme catalyses the following chemical reaction

ATP +
threonine
ADP +
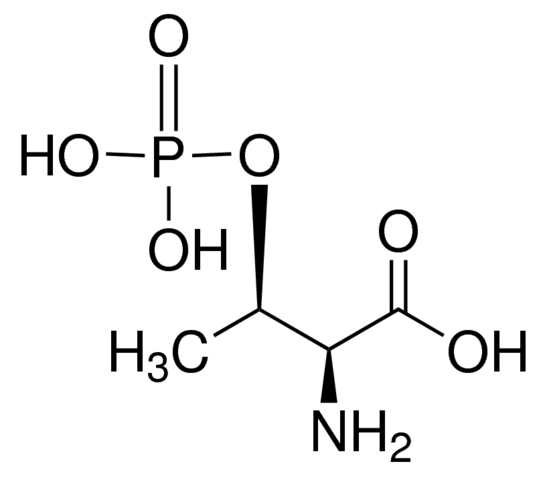
threonine phosphate

The enzyme characterised from the bacterium, Salmonella enterica, converts the amino acid, L-threonine, to threonine phosphate by transferring a phosphate group from the cofactor, adenosine triphosphate (ATP), which is converted to adenosine diphosphate (ADP). The reaction is part of the biosynthesis of adenosylcobalamin in this organism.

The enzyme takes part in the synthesis of adenosylcobalamin.
