= AdoCbi kinase/AdoCbi-phosphate guanylyltransferase =

AdoCbi kinase/AdoCbi-phosphate guanylyltransferase may refer to:

- Adenosylcobinamide-phosphate guanylyltransferase, an enzyme
- Adenosylcobinamide kinase, an enzyme
