= CBID =

CBID may refer to:

- Cobalt-precorrin-5B (C1)-methyltransferase
- Cobalamin biosynthesis
