= C63H88CoN14O14P =

The molecular formula C_{63}H_{88}CoN_{14}O_{14}P (molar mass: 1355.36 g/mol) may refer to:

- Vitamin B12
- Cyanocobalamin (Artificial B12)
