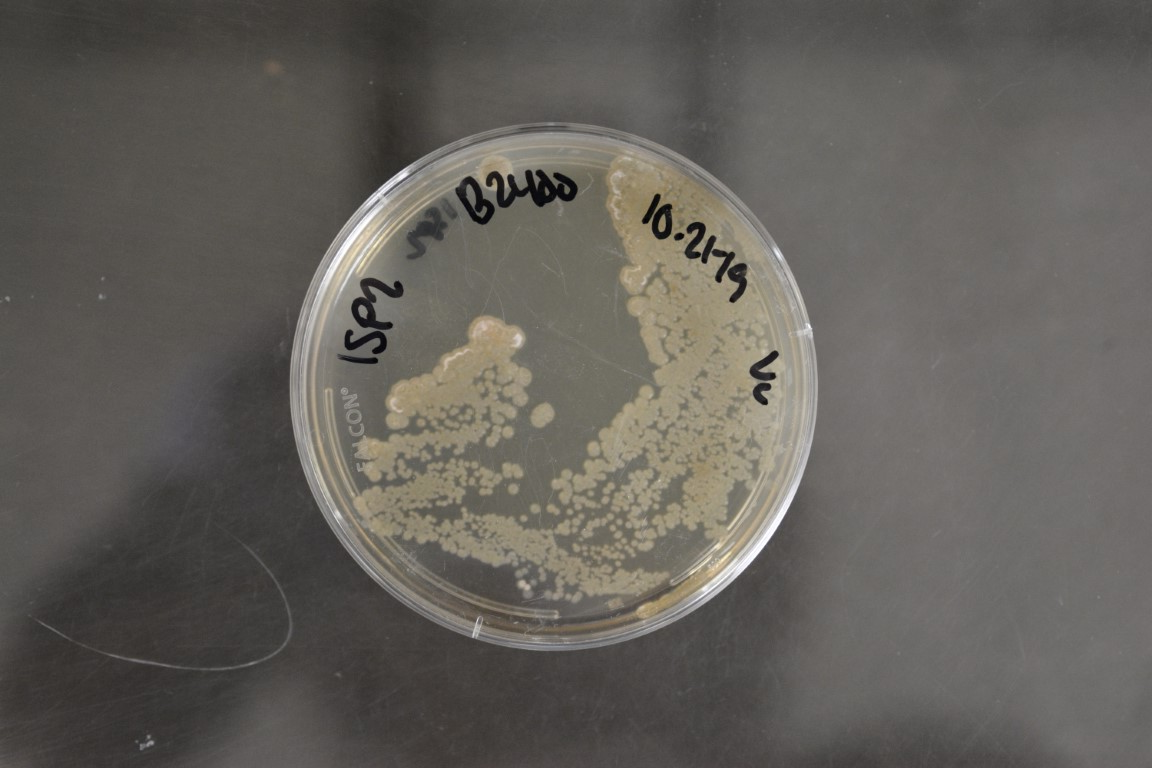

Scientific classification
- Domain: Bacteria
- Kingdom: Bacillati
- Phylum: Actinomycetota
- Class: Actinomycetes
- Order: Streptomycetales
- Family: Streptomycetaceae
- Genus: Streptomyces
- Species: S. mirabilis

Binomial name
- Streptomyces mirabilis Ruschmann 1952 (Approved Lists 1980)

Type strain
- Ankermann, ATCC 27447, BCRC 15200, CBS 489.62, CBS 751.72, CCRC 15200, CGMCC 4.1988, DSM 40553, ETH 28593, IFO 13450, ISP 5553, JCM 4551, JCM 4791, KCC S-0551, KCC S-0791, Lederle Labs AC-680, NBRC 13450, NRRL B-2400, NRRL-ISP 5553, RIA 1411

Synonyms
- "Actinomyces mirabilis" (Ruschmann 1952) Kudrina in Gauze et al. 1957

= Streptomyces mirabilis =

Species of bacterium

Streptomyces mirabilis is a bacterium species from the genus of Streptomyces. Streptomyces mirabilis produces miramycin and nitroreductase. Streptomyces mirabilis has a very high resistance against nickel.

== See also ==
- List of Streptomyces species
