= Adenosylcobyric acid synthase (glutamine-hydrolysing) =

Adenosylcobyric acid synthase (glutamine-hydrolyzing)

Identifiers
- EC no.: 6.3.5.10

Databases
- IntEnz: IntEnz view
- BRENDA: BRENDA entry
- ExPASy: NiceZyme view
- KEGG: KEGG entry
- MetaCyc: metabolic pathway
- PRIAM: profile
- PDB structures: RCSB PDB PDBe PDBsum
- Gene Ontology: AmiGO / QuickGO
Search
- PMC: articles
- PubMed: articles
- NCBI: proteins

In enzymology, an adenosylcobyric acid synthase (glutamine-hydrolysing) (EC 6.3.5.10) is an enzyme that catalyzes the chemical reaction

4 ATP + adenosylcobyrinic acid a,c-diamide + 4 L-glutamine + 4 H_{2}O $\rightleftharpoons$ 4 ADP + 4 phosphate + adenosylcobyric acid + 4 L-glutamate

The four substrates of this enzyme are ATP, adenosylcobyrinic acid a,c-diamide, L-glutamine, and H_{2}O; its four products are ADP, phosphate, adenosylcobyric acid, and L-glutamate.

This enzyme belongs to the family of ligases, specifically those forming carbon-nitrogen bonds carbon-nitrogen ligases with glutamine as amido-N-donor (Glutamine amidotransferases). The systematic name of this enzyme class is adenosylcobyrinic-acid-a,c-diamide:L-glutamine amido-ligase (ADP-forming). This enzyme is part of the biosynthetic pathway to cobalamin (vitamin B_{12}) in bacteria.

== See also ==
- Cobalamin biosynthesis
