= Adenosylcobinamide-GDP ribazoletransferase =

Enzyme

Identifiers
- EC no.: 2.7.8.26
- CAS no.: 137672-85-6

Databases
- IntEnz: IntEnz view
- BRENDA: BRENDA entry
- ExPASy: NiceZyme view
- KEGG: KEGG entry
- MetaCyc: metabolic pathway
- PRIAM: profile
- PDB structures: RCSB PDB PDBe PDBsum
Search
- PMC: articles
- PubMed: articles
- NCBI: proteins

Adenosylcobinamide-GDP ribazoletransferase (EC 2.7.8.26, CobS, cobalamin synthase, cobalamin-5'-phosphate synthase, cobalamin (5'-phosphate) synthase) is an enzyme with systematic name adenosylcobinamide-GDP:alpha-ribazole ribazoletransferase. This enzyme catalyses the following chemical reaction

(1) adenosylcobinamide-GDP + alpha-ribazole $\rightleftharpoons$ GMP + adenosylcobalamin
(2) adenosylcobinamide-GDP + alpha-ribazole 5'-phosphate $\rightleftharpoons$ GMP + adenosylcobalamin 5'-phosphate

This enzyme is part of the biosynthetic pathway to cobalamin (vitamin B_{12}) in bacteria.

== See also ==
- Cobalamin biosynthesis
