= Cobalt chelatase =

Enzyme

cobalt chelatase
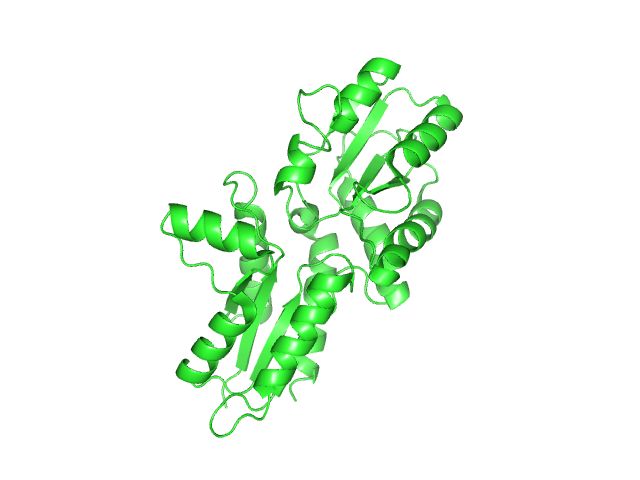
- Putative cobalt chelatase monomer from Desulvobrio vulgaris.

Identifiers
- EC no.: 6.6.1.2
- CAS no.: 81295-49-0

Databases
- IntEnz: IntEnz view
- BRENDA: BRENDA entry
- ExPASy: NiceZyme view
- KEGG: KEGG entry
- MetaCyc: metabolic pathway
- PRIAM: profile
- PDB structures: RCSB PDB PDBe PDBsum
- Gene Ontology: AmiGO / QuickGO
Search
- PMC: articles
- PubMed: articles
- NCBI: proteins

Cobalt chelatase, CobT subunit

Identifiers
- Symbol: CobT
- Pfam: PF06213
- InterPro: IPR006538
Available protein structures:
- Pfam: structures / ECOD
- PDB: RCSB PDB; PDBe; PDBj
- PDBsum: structure summary

Cobalt chelatase (EC 6.6.1.2) is an enzyme that catalyzes the chemical reaction

ATP + hydrogenobyrinic acid a,c-diamide + Co^{2+} + H_{2}O $\rightleftharpoons$ ADP + phosphate + cob(II)yrinic acid a,c-diamide + H^{+}

The four substrates of this enzyme are ATP, hydrogenobyrinic acid a,c-diamide, Co^{2+}, and H_{2}O; its four products are ADP, phosphate, cob(II)yrinic acid a,c-diamide, and H^{+}.

The aerobic cobalt chelatase (aerobic cobalamin biosynthesis pathway) consists of three subunits, CobT, CobN (InterPro: IPR003672) and CobS (InterPro: IPR006537).

The macrocycle of vitamin B12 can be complexed with metal via the ATP-dependent reactions in the aerobic pathway (e.g., in Pseudomonas denitrificans) or via ATP-independent reactions of sirohydrochlorin in the anaerobic pathway (e.g., in Salmonella typhimurium). The corresponding cobalt chelatases are not homologous. However, aerobic cobalt chelatase subunits CobN and CobS are homologous to Mg-chelatase subunits BchH and BchI, respectively. CobT, too, has been found to be remotely related to the third subunit of Mg-chelatase, BchD (involved in bacteriochlorophyll synthesis, e.g., in Rhodobacter capsulatus).

This enzyme belongs to the family of ligases, specifically those forming nitrogen-D-metal bonds in coordination complexes. The systematic name of this enzyme class is hydrogenobyrinic-acid-a,c-diamide:cobalt cobalt-ligase (ADP-forming). Other names in common use include hydrogenobyrinic acid a,c-diamide cobaltochelatase, CobNST, and CobNCobST. This enzyme is part of the biosynthetic pathway to cobalamin (vitamin B_{12}) in aerobic bacteria.

== See also ==
- Cobalamin biosynthesis
