= Precorrin-6A synthase (deacetylating) =

Identifiers
- EC no.: 2.1.1.152

Databases
- IntEnz: IntEnz view
- BRENDA: BRENDA entry
- ExPASy: NiceZyme view
- KEGG: KEGG entry
- MetaCyc: metabolic pathway
- PRIAM: profile
- PDB structures: RCSB PDB PDBe PDBsum
- Gene Ontology: AmiGO / QuickGO
Search
- PMC: articles
- PubMed: articles
- NCBI: proteins

Precorrin-6A synthase (deacetylating) (EC 2.1.1.152) is an enzyme that catalyzes the chemical reaction

The three substrates of this enzyme are S-adenosyl methionine, precorrin-5, and water. Its products are S-adenosylhomocysteine, precorrin-6A, and acetic acid. The enzyme was characterised from Pseudomonas denitrificans.

This enzyme belongs to the family of transferases, specifically those transferring one-carbon group methyltransferases. The systematic name of this enzyme class is S-adenosyl-L-methionine:precorrin-5 C1-methyltransferase (deacetylating). Other names in common use include precorrin-6X synthase (deacetylating), and CobF. It is part of the biosynthetic pathway to cobalamin (vitamin B_{12}) in aerobic bacteria.

== See also ==
- Cobalamin biosynthesis
