= Cobalt-precorrin-7 (C15)-methyltransferase (decarboxylating) =

Cobalt-precorrin-7 (C_{15})-methyltransferase (decarboxylating)

Identifiers
- EC no.: 2.1.1.196

Databases
- IntEnz: IntEnz view
- BRENDA: BRENDA entry
- ExPASy: NiceZyme view
- KEGG: KEGG entry
- MetaCyc: metabolic pathway
- PRIAM: profile
- PDB structures: RCSB PDB PDBe PDBsum
Search
- PMC: articles
- PubMed: articles
- NCBI: proteins

Cobalt-precorrin-7 (C_{15})-methyltransferase (decarboxylating) (EC 2.1.1.196, CbiT) is an enzyme with systematic name S-adenosyl-L-methionine:precorrin-7 C_{15}-methyltransferase (C_{12}-decarboxylating). This enzyme catalyses the following chemical reaction

cobalt-precorrin-7 + S-adenosyl-L-methionine $\rightleftharpoons$ cobalt-precorrin-8x + S-adenosyl-L-homocysteine + CO_{2}

This enzyme catalyses both methylation at C-15 and decarboxylation of the C-12 acetate side chain of cobalt-precorrin-7 in the anaerobic pathway of adenosylcobalamin biosynthesis in bacteria such as Salmonella typhimurium, Bacillus megaterium, and Propionibacterium freudenreichii subsp. shermanii.

== See also ==
- Cobalamin biosynthesis
