= Precorrin-4 C11-methyltransferase =

Identifiers
- EC no.: 2.1.1.133

Databases
- IntEnz: IntEnz view
- BRENDA: BRENDA entry
- ExPASy: NiceZyme view
- KEGG: KEGG entry
- MetaCyc: metabolic pathway
- PRIAM: profile
- PDB structures: RCSB PDB PDBe PDBsum
- Gene Ontology: AmiGO / QuickGO
Search
- PMC: articles
- PubMed: articles
- NCBI: proteins

Precorrin-4 C11-methyltransferase (EC 2.1.1.133) is an enzyme that catalyzes the chemical reaction

precorrin-4
+ SAM
precorrin-5
+ SAH

This is a methylation reaction in which the cobalamin precursor, precorrin-4, is converted to precorrin-4. The methyl group comes from the cofactor, S-adenosyl methionine (SAM), which becomes S-adenosyl-L-homocysteine (SAH). The enzyme was characterised from Pseudomonas denitrificans and Salmonella typhimurium.

This enzyme belongs to the family of transferases, specifically those transferring one-carbon group methyltransferases. The systematic name of this enzyme class is S-adenosyl-L-methionine:precorrin-4 C11 methyltransferase. Other names in common use include precorrin-3 methylase, and CobM. It is part of the biosynthetic pathway to vitamin B_{12} in aerobic bacteria.

== See also ==
- Cobalamin biosynthesis

== Structural studies ==
As of late 2007, two structures have been solved for this class of enzymes, with PDB accession codes 1CBF and 2CBF.
