= Cobyrinate a,c-diamide synthase =

Identifiers
- EC no.: 6.3.5.11

Databases
- BRENDA: enzyme data
- ExPASy: NiceZyme view
- KEGG: enzyme entry
- MetaCyc: metabolic pathway
- Rhea: reactions
- PDB structures: RCSB PDB PDBe PDBsum
Search
- PMC: articles
- PubMed: articles
- NCBI: proteins

Cobyrinate a,c-diamide synthase (EC ), cobyrinic acid a,c-diamide synthetase, CbiA (gene)) is an enzyme which catalyses the chemical reaction

2 ATP + cobyrinate + 2 L-glutamine + 2 H_{2}O $\rightleftharpoons$ 2 ADP + 2 phosphate + cobyrinate a,c-diamide + 2 L-glutamate (overall reaction)
(1a) ATP + cobyrinate + L-glutamine + H_{2}O $\rightleftharpoons$ ADP + phosphate + cobyrinate c-monamide + L-glutamate
(1b) ATP + cobyrinate c-monamide + L-glutamine + H_{2}O $\rightleftharpoons$ ADP + phosphate + cobyrinate a,c-diamide + L-glutamate

This enzyme is a glutamine amidotransferase, part of the biosynthetic pathway to cobalamin (vitamin B_{12}) in anaerobic bacteria such as Salmonella typhimurium and Bacillus megaterium.

== See also ==
- Cobalamin biosynthesis
