= COBU =

COBU may refer to:

- Adenosylcobinamide kinase (also called CobU), an enzyme
- Make Your Move 3D (formerly called Cobu 3D) a 2013 dance film
