= Precorrin-6Y C5,15-methyltransferase (decarboxylating) =

precorrin-6Y C5,15-methyltransferase (decarboxylating)

Identifiers
- EC no.: 2.1.1.132

Databases
- IntEnz: IntEnz view
- BRENDA: BRENDA entry
- ExPASy: NiceZyme view
- KEGG: KEGG entry
- MetaCyc: metabolic pathway
- PRIAM: profile
- PDB structures: RCSB PDB PDBe PDBsum
- Gene Ontology: AmiGO / QuickGO
Search
- PMC: articles
- PubMed: articles
- NCBI: proteins

In enzymology, a precorrin-6Y C5,15-methyltransferase (decarboxylating) (EC 2.1.1.132) is an enzyme that catalyzes the chemical reaction

2 S-adenosyl-L-methionine + precorrin-6Y $\rightleftharpoons$ 2 S-adenosyl-L-homocysteine + precorrin-8X + CO_{2}

The two substrates of this enzyme are S-adenosyl methionine and precorrin 6Y; its three products are S-adenosylhomocysteine, precorrin 8X, and CO_{2}.

This enzyme belongs to the family of transferases, specifically those transferring one-carbon group methyltransferases. The systematic name of this enzyme class is S-adenosyl-L-methionine:1-precorrin-6Y C5,15-methyltransferase (C-12-decarboxylating). Other names in common use include precorrin-6 methyltransferase, precorrin-6Y methylase and CobL. This enzyme is part of the biosynthetic pathway to cobalamin (vitamin B_{12}) in aerobic bacteria.

== See also ==
- Cobalamin biosynthesis
