= Methylcobalamin =

Form of vitamin B12

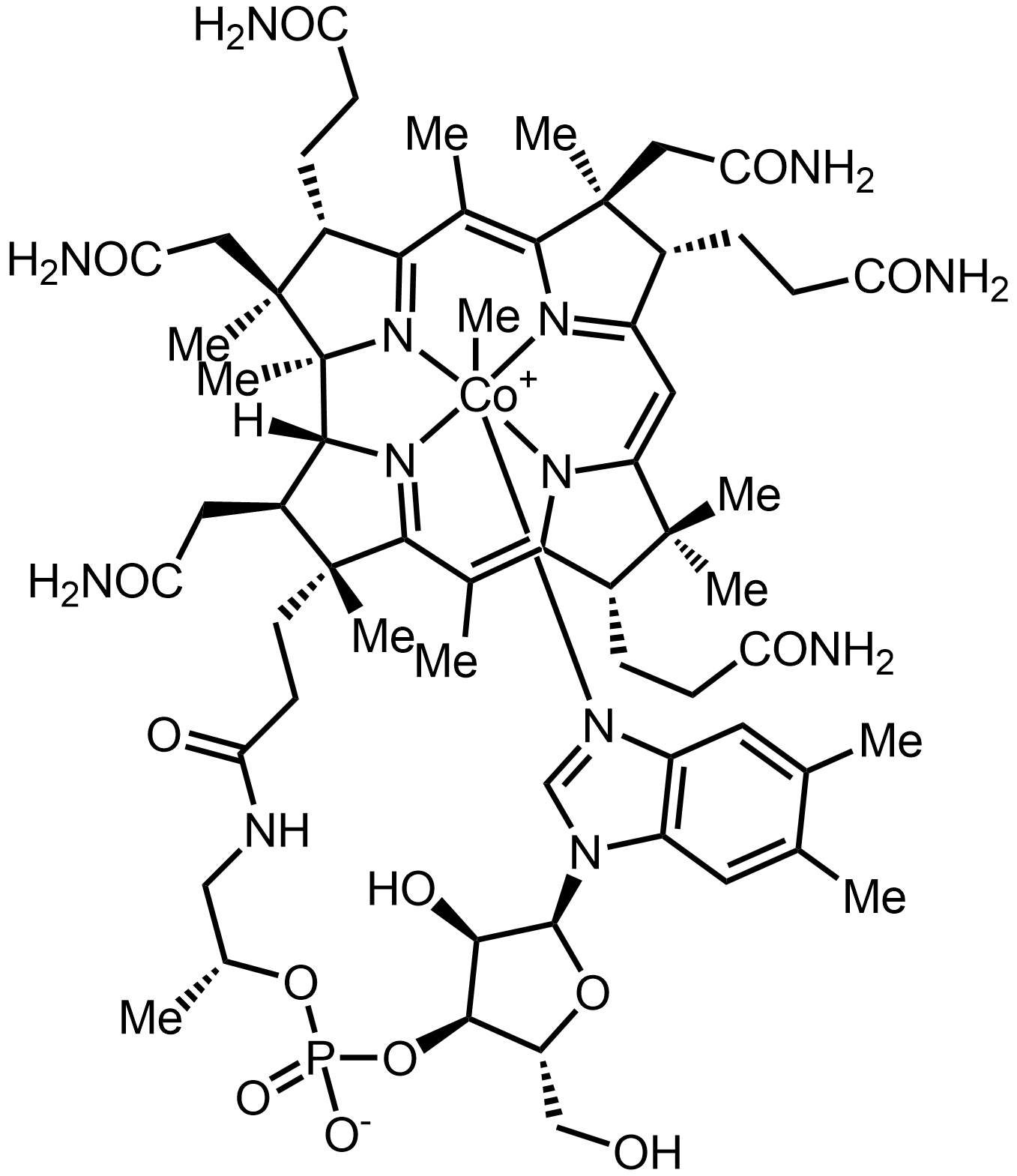

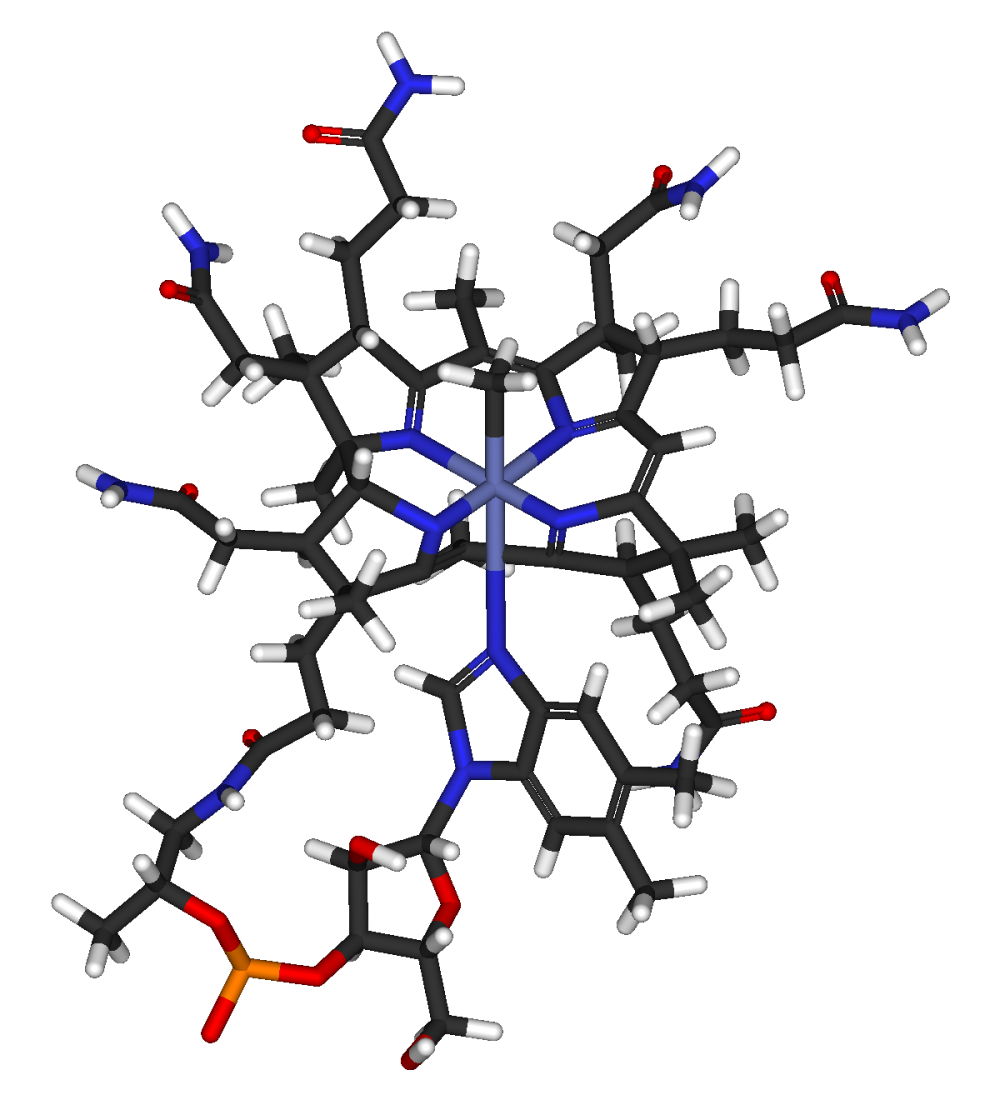

Clinical data
- Trade names: Cobolmin
- AHFS/Drugs.com: International Drug Names
- Routes of administration: By mouth, sublingual, injection.
- ATC code: B03BA05 (WHO)

Legal status
- Legal status: US: OTC

Identifiers
- IUPAC name: Coα-[α-(5,6-dimethylbenzimidazolyl)]-Coβ-methylcobamide
- CAS Number: 13422-55-4
- PubChem CID: 6436232
- ChemSpider: 29368587
- UNII: BR1SN1JS2W
- ChEMBL: ChEMBL1697757
- CompTox Dashboard (EPA): DTXSID5048631
- ECHA InfoCard: 100.033.200

Chemical and physical data
- Formula: C_{63}H_{91}CoN_{13}O_{14}P
- Molar mass: 1344.405 g·mol^{−1}
- 3D model (JSmol): Interactive image
- SMILES: [CH3-].CC1=CC2=C(C=C1C)N(C=N2)C3C(C(C(O3)CO)OP(=O)([O-])OC(C)CNC(=O)CCC4(C(C5C6(C(C(C(=N6)C(=C7C(C(C(=N7)C=C8C(C(C(=N8)C(=C4[N-]5)C)CCC(=O)N)(C)C)CCC(=O)N)(C)CC(=O)N)C)CCC(=O)N)(C)CC(=O)N)C)CC(=O)N)C)O.[Co+3]
- InChI: InChI=1S/C62H90N13O14P.CH3.Co/c1-29-20-39-40(21-30(29)2)75(28-70-39)57-52(84)53(41(27-76)87-57)89-90(85,86)88-31(3)26-69-49(83)18-19-59(8)37(22-46(66)80)56-62(11)61(10,25-48(68)82)36(14-17-45(65)79)51(74-62)33(5)55-60(9,24-47(67)81)34(12-15-43(63)77)38(71-55)23-42-58(6,7)35(13-16-44(64)78)50(72-42)32(4)54(59)73-56;;/h20-21,23,28,31,34-37,41,52-53,56-57,76,84H,12-19,22,24-27H2,1-11H3,(H15,63,64,65,66,67,68,69,71,72,73,74,77,78,79,80,81,82,83,85,86);1H3;/q;-1;+3/p-2; Key:ZFLASALABLFSNM-UHFFFAOYSA-L

Methylcobalamin (mecobalamin, MeCbl, or MeB12) is a cobalamin, a form of vitamin B12. It differs from cyanocobalamin in that the cyano group at the cobalt is replaced with a methyl group. Methylcobalamin features an octahedral cobalt(III) centre and can be obtained as bright red crystals. Methylcobalamin is notable as a rare example of a biological compound that contains metal–alkyl bonds. Nickel–methyl intermediates have been proposed for the final step of methanogenesis.

== Production ==
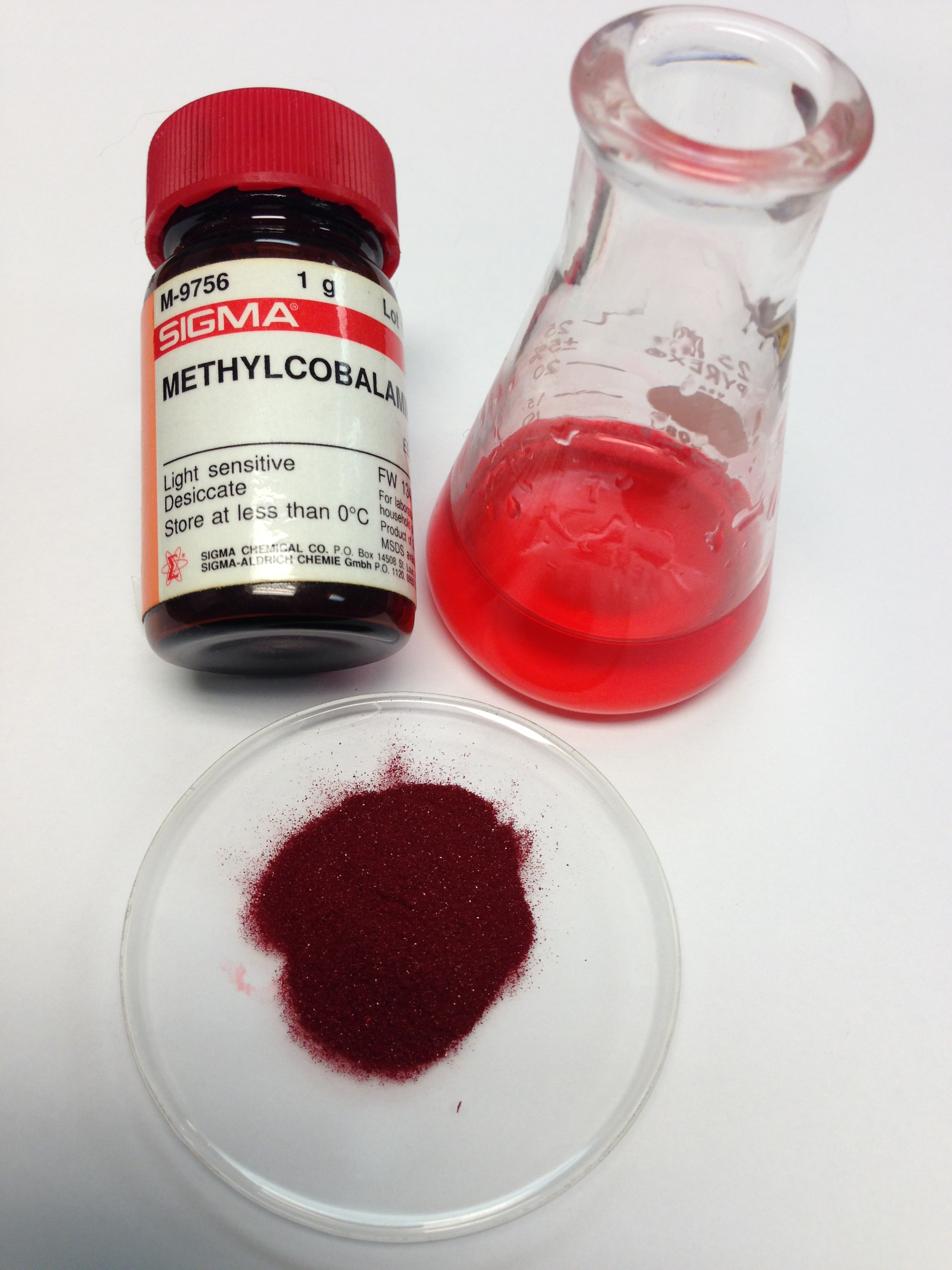
Methylcobalamin physically resembles the other forms of vitamin B_{12}, occurring as dark red crystals that freely form cherry-colored transparent solutions in water.

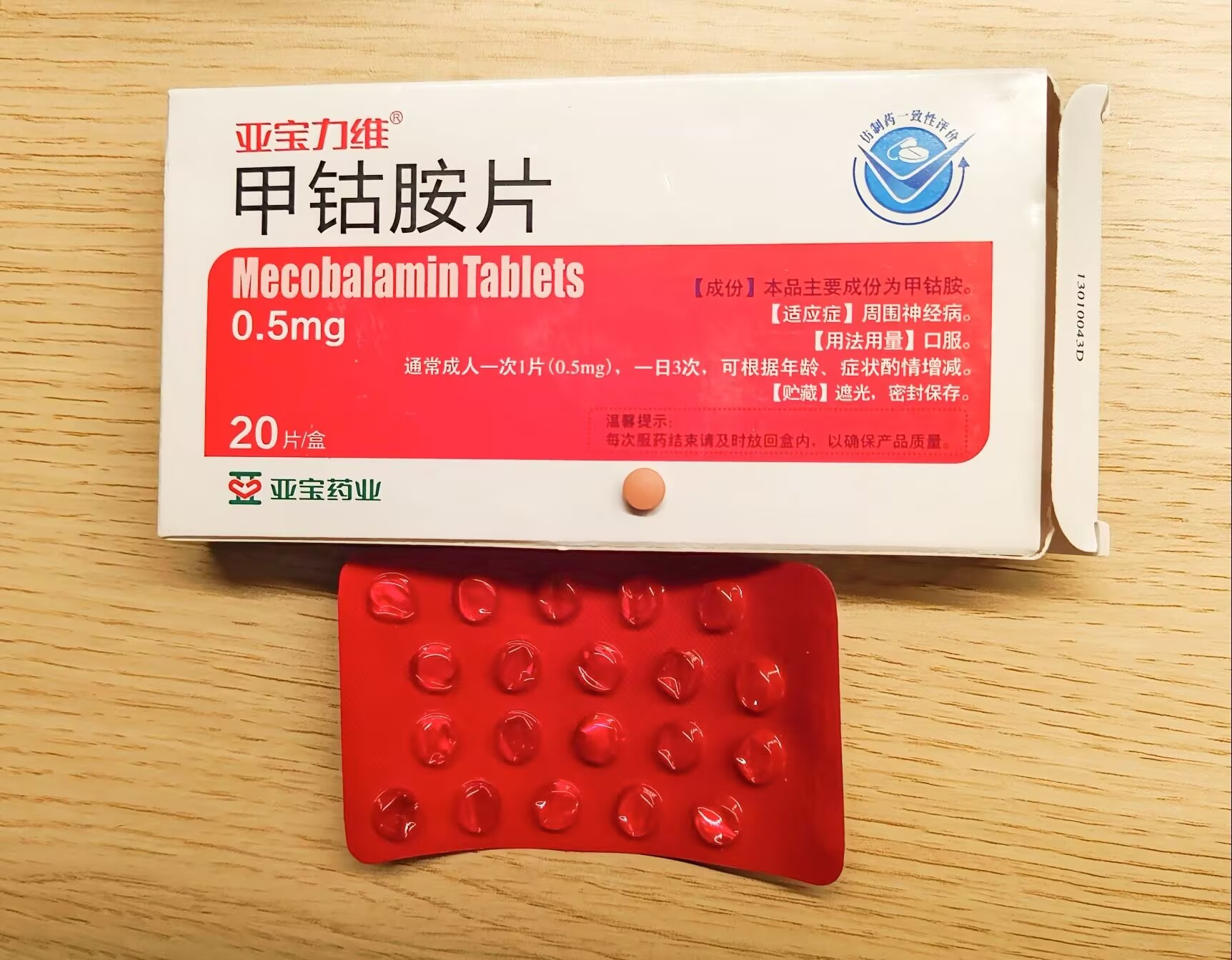
A box of generic mecobalamin tablets sold in China

Methylcobalamin can be produced in the laboratory by reducing cyanocobalamin with sodium borohydride in alkaline solution, followed by the addition of methyl iodide.

== Functions ==
This vitamer, along with adenosylcobalamin, is one of two active coenzymes used by vitamin B_{12}-dependent enzymes and is the specific vitamin B_{12} form used by 5-methyltetrahydrofolate-homocysteine methyltransferase (MTR), also known as methionine synthase.

Methylcobalamin participates in the Wood–Ljungdahl pathway, which is a pathway by which some organisms utilize carbon dioxide as their source of organic compounds. In this pathway, methylcobalamin provides the methyl group that couples to carbon monoxide (derived from CO_{2}) to afford acetyl-CoA. Acetyl-CoA is a derivative of acetic acid that is converted to more complex molecules as required by the organism.

Methylcobalamin is produced by some bacteria. It plays an important role in the environment, where it is responsible for the biomethylation of certain heavy metals. For example, the highly toxic methylmercury is produced by the action of methylcobalamin. In this role, methylcobalamin is the source of "CH_{3}^{+}".

=== Role in human health ===
Methylcobalamin is equivalent physiologically to vitamin B_{12}, and can be used to prevent or treat pathology arising from a lack of vitamin B_{12} intake (vitamin B_{12} deficiency). Methylcobalamin is considered to be equivalent in efficacy to the other vitamin B_{12} vitamers as a dietary supplement, with no clear evidence of differing efficacy between them.

Methylcobalamin that is ingested is not used directly as a cofactor, but is first converted by MMACHC into cob(II)alamin. Cob(II)alamin is then later converted into the other two forms, adenosylcobalamin and methylcobalamin for use as cofactors. That is, methylcobalamin is first dealkylated and then regenerated.

=== Research directions ===
Ultra-high-dose intravenous methylcobalamin is researched as treatment of peripheral neuropathy, diabetic neuropathy, and as a preliminary treatment for amyotrophic lateral sclerosis.

== See also ==
- Hydroxocobalamin
- Cobalamin biosynthesis
