= Precorrin-6A reductase =

Class of enzymes

precorrin-6A reductase

Identifiers
- EC no.: 1.3.1.54
- CAS no.: 137672-84-5

Databases
- IntEnz: IntEnz view
- BRENDA: BRENDA entry
- ExPASy: NiceZyme view
- KEGG: KEGG entry
- MetaCyc: metabolic pathway
- PRIAM: profile
- PDB structures: RCSB PDB PDBe PDBsum
- Gene Ontology: AmiGO / QuickGO
Search
- PMC: articles
- PubMed: articles
- NCBI: proteins

In enzymology, precorrin-6A reductase (EC 1.3.1.54) is an enzyme that catalyzes the chemical reaction

precorrin-6A
+ NADP^{+}
H^{+}
H^{+}
precorrin-6B
+ NADPH

The three substrates of this enzyme are precorrin-6A, reduced nicotinamide adenine dinucleotide phosphate (NADPH) and a proton. Its products are precorrin-6B and oxidised NADP^{+}.

This enzyme belongs to the family of oxidoreductases, specifically those acting on the CH=CH group of an acceptor with NAD or NADPH as donor. The systematic name of this enzyme class is precorrin-6B:NADP+ oxidoreductase. Other names in common use include precorrin-6X reductase, precorrin-6Y:NADP+ oxidoreductase and CobK. This enzyme is part of the biosynthetic pathway to cobalamin (vitamin B_{12}) in aerobic bacteria.

== See also ==
- Cobalamin biosynthesis
