= Precorrin-3B C17-methyltransferase =

Identifiers
- EC no.: 2.1.1.131
- CAS no.: 152787-64-9

Databases
- IntEnz: IntEnz view
- BRENDA: BRENDA entry
- ExPASy: NiceZyme view
- KEGG: KEGG entry
- MetaCyc: metabolic pathway
- PRIAM: profile
- PDB structures: RCSB PDB PDBe PDBsum
- Gene Ontology: AmiGO / QuickGO
Search
- PMC: articles
- PubMed: articles
- NCBI: proteins

Precorrin-3B C17-methyltransferase (EC 2.1.1.131) is an enzyme that catalyzes the chemical reaction

precorrin-3B
+ SAM
precorrin-4
+ SAH

The two substrates of this enzyme are the chlorin, precorrin-3B and S-adenosyl methionine. Its products are precorrin-4 and S-adenosylhomocysteine.

This enzyme belongs to the family of transferases, specifically those transferring one-carbon group methyltransferases. The systematic name of this enzyme class is S-adenosyl-L-methionine:precorrin-3B C17-methyltransferase. Other names in common use include precorrin-3 methyltransferase, and CobJ. This enzyme is part of the biosynthetic pathway to cobalamin (vitamin B_{12}) in aerobic bacteria and during this step the macrocycle ring-contracts so that the corrin core of the vitamin is formed.

== See also ==
- Cobalamin biosynthesis
