= Precorrin-3B synthase =

Class of enzymes

Identifiers
- EC no.: 1.14.13.83

Databases
- IntEnz: IntEnz view
- BRENDA: BRENDA entry
- ExPASy: NiceZyme view
- KEGG: KEGG entry
- MetaCyc: metabolic pathway
- PRIAM: profile
- PDB structures: RCSB PDB PDBe PDBsum
- Gene Ontology: AmiGO / QuickGO
Search
- PMC: articles
- PubMed: articles
- NCBI: proteins

Precorrin-3B synthase (EC 1.14.13.83) is an enzyme that catalyzes the chemical reaction

precorrin-3A
+ NADH
O_{2} + H^{+}
H_{2}O
precorrin-3B
+ NAD^{+}

The four substrates of this enzyme are precorrin-3A, reduced nicotinamide adenine dinucleotide (NADH), oxygen, and a proton. Its products are precorrin-3B, oxidised NAD^{+}, and water.

This enzyme is an iron–sulfur protein acting as an oxidoreductase, with molecular oxygen as oxidant and incorporating one of its atoms. The systematic name of this enzyme class is precorrin-3A,NADH:oxygen oxidoreductase (20-hydroxylating). Other names in common use include precorrin-3X synthase, and CobG. This enzyme is part of the biosynthetic pathway to cobalamin (vitamin B_{12}) in aerobic bacteria.

== See also ==
- Cobalamin biosynthesis
