= Hydrogenobyrinic acid a,c-diamide synthase (glutamine-hydrolysing) =

Class of enzymes

Identifiers
- EC no.: 6.3.5.9
- CAS no.: 132053-22-6

Databases
- IntEnz: IntEnz view
- BRENDA: BRENDA entry
- ExPASy: NiceZyme view
- KEGG: KEGG entry
- MetaCyc: metabolic pathway
- PRIAM: profile
- PDB structures: RCSB PDB PDBe PDBsum
- Gene Ontology: AmiGO / QuickGO
Search
- PMC: articles
- PubMed: articles
- NCBI: proteins

In enzymology, a hydrogenobyrinic acid a,c-diamide synthase (glutamine-hydrolysing) (EC 6.3.5.9) is an enzyme that catalyzes the chemical reaction

2 ATP + hydrogenobyrinic acid + 2 L-glutamine + 2 H_{2}O $\rightleftharpoons$ 2 ADP + 2 phosphate + hydrogenobyrinic acid a,c-diamide + 2 L-glutamate

The four substrates of this enzyme are ATP, hydrogenobyrinic acid, L-glutamine, and H_{2}O; its four products are ADP, phosphate, hydrogenobyrinic acid a,c-diamide, and L-glutamate.

This enzyme belongs to the family of ligases, specifically those forming carbon-nitrogen bonds carbon-nitrogen ligases with glutamine as amido-N-donor. The systematic name of this enzyme class is hydrogenobyrinic-acid:L-glutamine amido-ligase (AMP-forming). This enzyme is also called CobB and is part of the biosynthetic pathway to cobalamin (vitamin B_{12}) in aerobic bacteria.

== See also ==
- Cobalamin biosynthesis
