= Alpha-ribazole phosphatase =

Class of enzymes

adenosylcobalamin/α-ribazole phosphatase

Identifiers
- EC no.: 3.1.3.73
- CAS no.: 251991-06-7

Databases
- BRENDA: enzyme data
- ExPASy: NiceZyme view
- KEGG: enzyme entry
- MetaCyc: metabolic pathway
- Rhea: reactions
- PDB structures: RCSB PDB PDBe PDBsum
- Gene Ontology: AmiGO / QuickGO
Search
- PMC: articles
- PubMed: articles
- NCBI: proteins

The primary biochemical reaction catalyzed by the enzyme adenosylcobalamin/α-ribazole phosphatase (formerly α-ribazole phosphatase) (EC 3.1.3.73) is

adenosylcobalamin 5′-phosphate + H_{2}O = coenzyme B_{12} + phosphate

This enzyme can also catalyze the following reaction in vitro, however it is not the biologically relevant reaction

α-ribazole 5′-phosphate + H_{2}O $\rightleftharpoons$ α-ribazole + phosphate

This enzyme belongs to the family of hydrolases, specifically those acting on phosphoric monoester bonds. The systematic name is adenosylcobalamin/α-ribazole-5′-phosphate phosphohydrolase. This enzyme is also called CobC. The reaction is the final step in the biosynthetic pathway to cobalamin (vitamin B_{12}) in bacteria.

== Structural studies ==
As of late 2007, 16 structures have been solved for this class of enzymes, with PDB accession codes PDB: 2ENU, PDB: 2ENW, PDB: 2EOA, PDB: 2OWE, PDB: 2P2Y, PDB: 2P2Z, PDB: 2P30, PDB: 2P6M, PDB: 2P6O, PDB: 2P75, PDB: 2P77, PDB: 2P78, PDB: 2P79, PDB: 2P9Y, PDB: 2P9Z, and PDB: 2PA0.

== See also ==
- Cobalamin biosynthesis
