= Precorrin-8X methylmutase =

Class of enzymes

precorrin-8X methylmutase
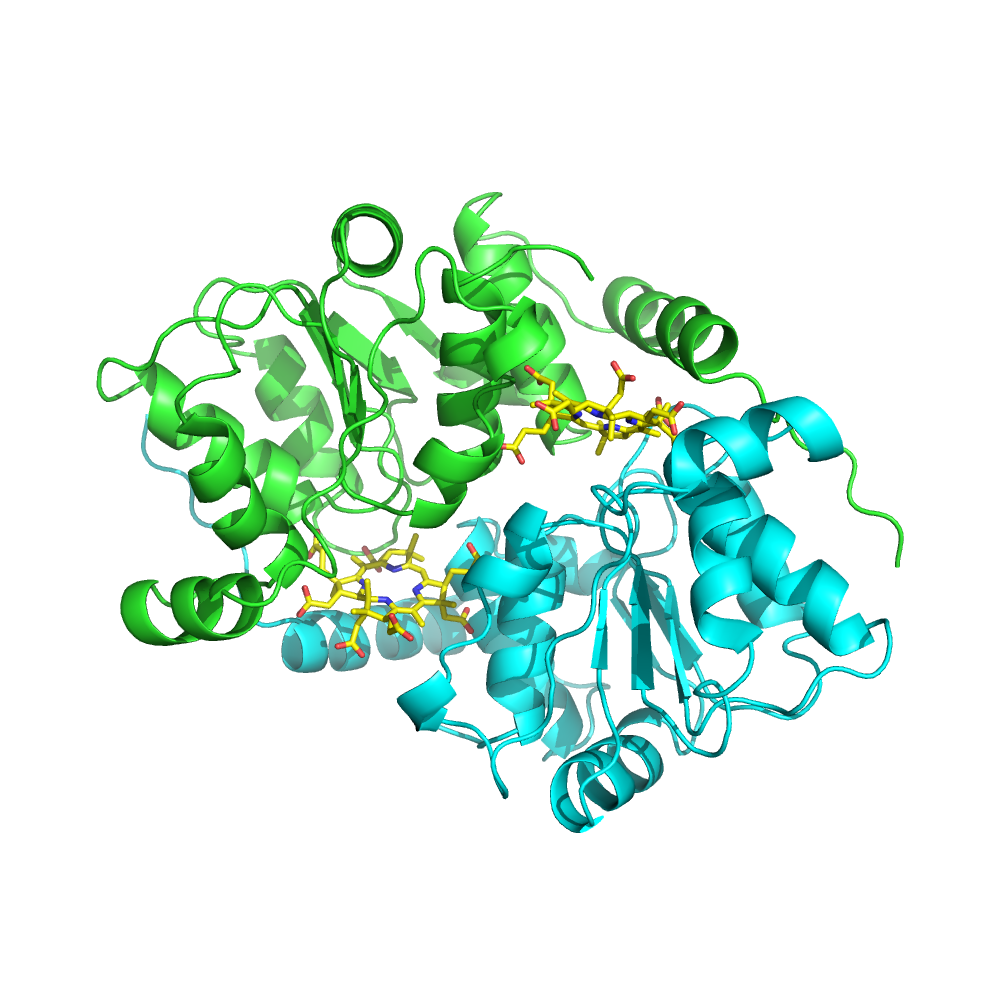
- Crystal structure of precorrin-8x methyl mutase with bound hydrogenobyrinate. PDB 1i1h

Identifiers
- EC no.: 5.4.99.61

Databases
- IntEnz: IntEnz view
- BRENDA: BRENDA entry
- ExPASy: NiceZyme view
- KEGG: KEGG entry
- MetaCyc: metabolic pathway
- PRIAM: profile
- PDB structures: RCSB PDB PDBe PDBsum
- Gene Ontology: AmiGO / QuickGO
Search
- PMC: articles
- PubMed: articles
- NCBI: proteins

In enzymology, a precorrin-8X methylmutase (EC 5.4.99.61) is an enzyme that catalyzes the chemical reaction

precorrin-8X $\rightleftharpoons$ hydrogenobyrinate

Hence, this enzyme has one substrate, precorrin 8X, and one product, hydrogenobyrinate.

This enzyme belongs to the family of isomerases, specifically those intramolecular transferases transferring other groups. The systematic name of this enzyme class is precorrin-8X 11,12-methylmutase. Other names in common use include precorrin isomerase, hydrogenobyrinic acid-binding protein and CobH. This enzyme is part of the biosynthetic pathway to cobalamin (vitamin B_{12}) in aerobic bacteria.

== See also ==
- Cobalamin biosynthesis

== Structural studies ==
As of late 2007, 6 structures have been solved for this class of enzymes, with PDB accession codes 1F2V, 1I1H, 1OU0, 1V9C, 2AFR, and 2AFV.
