= Threonine-phosphate decarboxylase =

Class of enzymes

Identifiers
- EC no.: 4.1.1.81

Databases
- BRENDA: enzyme data
- ExPASy: NiceZyme view
- KEGG: enzyme entry
- MetaCyc: metabolic pathway
- Rhea: reactions
- PDB structures: RCSB PDB PDBe PDBsum
- Gene Ontology: AmiGO / QuickGO
Search
- PMC: articles
- PubMed: articles
- NCBI: proteins

The enzyme threonine-phosphate decarboxylase (EC 4.1.1.81), characterised from Salmonella typhimurium, catalyzes the decarboxylation of threonine phosphate to (R)-1-aminopropan-2-yl phosphate and carbon dioxide:

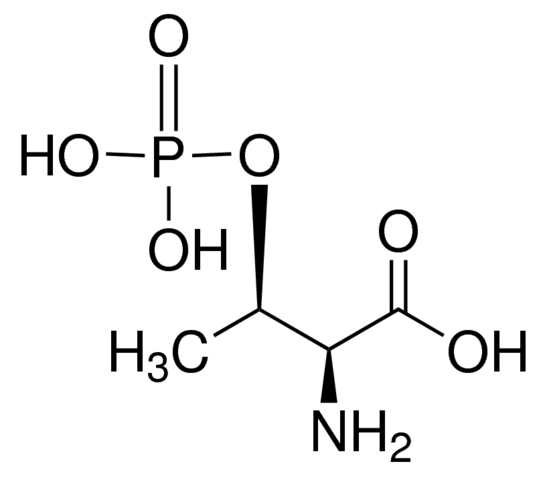
threonine phosphate
CO_{2}
(R)-1-aminopropan-2-yl phosphate

This reaction is part of the biosynthetic pathway to cobalamin (vitamin B_{12}) in anaerobic bacteria such as Salmonella typhimurium and Bacillus megaterium. In the next step, (R)-1-aminopropan-2-ol is attached to adenosylcobyric acid by adenosylcobinamide-phosphate synthase, forming adenosylcobinamide phosphate. The structure of the enzyme has been determined by X-ray crystallography.

This enzyme is a lyase, specifically a carboxy-lyase, which cleave carbon-carbon bonds. The systematic name of this enzyme class is L-threonine-O-3-phosphate carboxy-lyase [(R)-1-aminopropan-2-yl-phosphate-forming]. Other names in use include L-threonine-O-3-phosphate decarboxylase, CobD and L-threonine-O-3-phosphate carboxy-lyase.

== See also ==
- Cobalamin biosynthesis
