= Cobalt-precorrin 5A hydrolase =

Identifiers
- EC no.: 3.7.1.12

Databases
- IntEnz: IntEnz view
- BRENDA: BRENDA entry
- ExPASy: NiceZyme view
- KEGG: KEGG entry
- MetaCyc: metabolic pathway
- PRIAM: profile
- PDB structures: RCSB PDB PDBe PDBsum
Search
- PMC: articles
- PubMed: articles
- NCBI: proteins

Cobalt-precorrin 5A hydrolase (EC 3.7.1.12), CbiG (gene)) is an enzyme with systematic name cobalt-precorrin 5A acylhydrolase. This enzyme catalyses the following chemical reaction

cobalt-precorrin-5A + H_{2}O $\rightleftharpoons$ cobalt-precorrin-5B + acetaldehyde + 2 H^{+}

This enzyme hydrolyses the ring A acetate delta-lactone of cobalt-precorrin-5A and releases a two-carbon fragment from the macrocyclic corrin ring as acetaldehyde. This is part of the biosynthetic pathway to cobalamin (vitamin B_{12}) in anaerobic bacteria such as Salmonella typhimurium and Bacillus megaterium.

== See also ==
- Cobalamin biosynthesis
