= Adenosylcobinamide-phosphate synthase =

Class of enzymes

Identifiers
- EC no.: 6.3.1.10
- CAS no.: 905988-16-1

Databases
- BRENDA: enzyme data
- ExPASy: NiceZyme view
- KEGG: enzyme entry
- MetaCyc: metabolic pathway
- Rhea: reactions
- PDB structures: RCSB PDB PDBe PDBsum
Search
- PMC: articles
- PubMed: articles
- NCBI: proteins

Adenosylcobinamide-phosphate synthase (EC 6.3.1.10, CbiB) is an enzyme with systematic name adenosylcobyric acid:(R)-1-aminopropan-2-yl phosphate ligase (ADP-forming). This enzyme catalyses the following chemical reaction

(1) ATP + adenosylcobyric acid + (R)-1-aminopropan-2-yl phosphate $\rightleftharpoons$ ADP + phosphate + adenosylcobinamide phosphate
(2) ATP + adenosylcobyric acid + (R)-1-aminopropan-2-ol $\rightleftharpoons$ ADP + phosphate + adenosylcobinamide

One of the substrates, (R)-1-aminopropan-2-yl phosphate, is produced by CobD (EC 4.1.1.81). This enzyme is part of the biosynthetic pathway to cobalamin (vitamin B_{12}) in bacteria.

== See also ==
- Cobalamin biosynthesis
