= Cobalt-precorrin-5B (C1)-methyltransferase =

Cobalt-precorrin-5B (C^{1})-methyltransferase

Identifiers
- EC no.: 2.1.1.195

Databases
- IntEnz: IntEnz view
- BRENDA: BRENDA entry
- ExPASy: NiceZyme view
- KEGG: KEGG entry
- MetaCyc: metabolic pathway
- PRIAM: profile
- PDB structures: RCSB PDB PDBe PDBsum
Search
- PMC: articles
- PubMed: articles
- NCBI: proteins

Cobalt-precorrin-5B (C^{1})-methyltransferase (EC 2.1.1.195), cobalt-precorrin-6A synthase, CbiD (gene)) is an enzyme with systematic name S-adenosyl-L-methionine:cobalt-precorrin-5B (C^{1})-methyltransferase. This enzyme catalyses the following chemical reaction

cobalt-precorrin-5B + S-adenosyl-L-methionine $\rightleftharpoons$ cobalt-precorrin-6A + S-adenosyl-L-homocysteine

This enzyme catalyses the C-1 methylation of cobalt-precorrin-5B in the anaerobic pathway of adenosylcobalamin biosynthesis in bacteria such as Salmonella typhimurium, Bacillus megaterium, and Propionibacterium freudenreichii subsp. shermanii.

== See also ==
- Cobalamin biosynthesis
