= Nitroreductase =

Class of enzymes

Identifiers
- Symbol: Nitroreductase
- Pfam: PF00881
- InterPro: IPR000415
- CDD: cd02062
Available protein structures:
- PDB: PDB: 1bkj PDB: 1ds7 PDB: 1f5v PDB: 1icr PDB: 1icu PDB: 1icv PDB: 1idt PDB: 1kqb PDB: 1kqc PDB: 1kqd IPR000415 PF00881 (ECOD; PDBsum)
- AlphaFold: IPR000415; PF00881

Nitroreductases are a family of evolutionarily related proteins involved in the reduction of nitrogen-containing compounds, including those containing the nitro functional group. Members of this family utilise flavin mononucleotide as a cofactor and are often found to be homodimers.

Members of this family include oxygen-insensitive NAD(P)H nitroreductase (flavin mononucleotide-dependent nitroreductase) (6,7-dihydropteridine reductase) (EC 1.5.1.34) and NADH dehydrogenase (EC 1.6.99.3). A number of these proteins are described as oxidoreductases. They are primarily found in bacterial lineages though a number of eukaryotic homologs have been identified: C. elegans P34273, D. melanogaster Q8T3Q0, Q9VTE7, mouse Q9DCX8 and human O75989. This protein is not found in photosynthetic eukaryotes. The sequences containing this entry in photosynthetic organisms are possible false positives.

The nitroreductase of Enterobacter cloacae was identified by Bryant and Deluca in a strain isolated from a munitions facility, on the basis of its ability to metabolize TNT (trinitrotoluene). Since then many homologues have been identified and the family is now known to include members in diverse organisms, that catalize diverse reactions. The iodotyrosine deiodenase of mammals is a dehalogenase, the BluB of Sinorhizobium meliloti cannibalizes the bound flavin mononucleotideto furnish a critical intermediate in vitamin B12 biosynthesis.

Crystal structures of the E. cloacae and E. coli enzymes have been published with a variety of substrates and analogues bound.

An example of a potential cold-active enzyme for prodrug therapy was described using a cold-active nitroreductase, Ssap-NtrB (Çelik and Yetis, 2012). Despite Ssap-NtrB derived from a mesophilic bacterium, it showed optimal activity at 20°C against cancer prodrugs. Authors comment that the cold-activity of this novel enzyme will be useful for therapies in combination with crymotherapy, exposing the target tissue to low temperatures in order to trigger the enzyme activity to activate the drug only where is required. Moreover, the enzyme could also be used for bioremediation of compounds of explosive and volatile nature in regions where high activity at low temperatures is needed.

== Subfamilies ==
- Cob(II)yrinic acid a,c-diamide reductase InterPro: IPR012825

== Human proteins containing this domain ==
Iodotyrosine deiodinase (IYD)
