= Adenosylcobinamide-phosphate guanylyltransferase =

Class of enzymes

adenosylcobinamide-phosphate guanylyltransferase
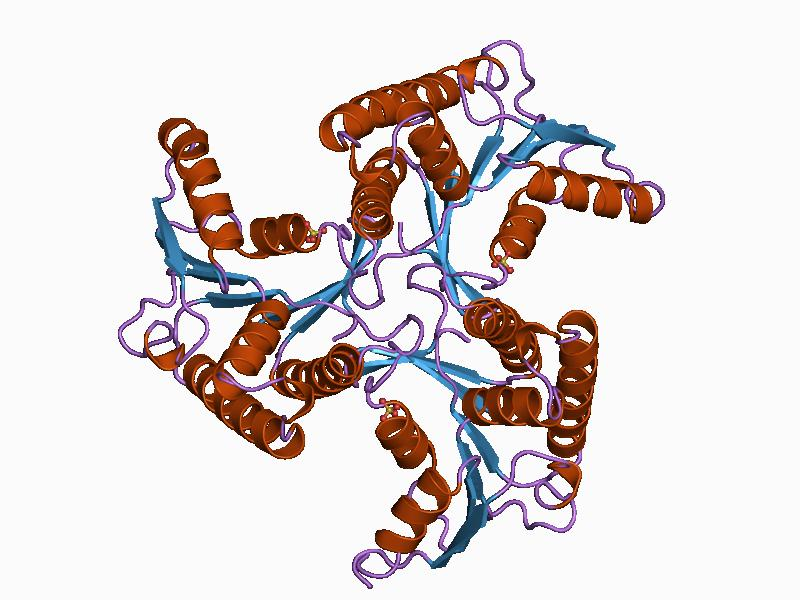
- adenosylcobinamide phosphate guanylyltransferase (CobU) from salmonella typhimurium

Identifiers
- EC no.: 2.7.7.62

Databases
- BRENDA: enzyme data
- ExPASy: NiceZyme view
- KEGG: enzyme entry
- MetaCyc: metabolic pathway
- Rhea: reactions
- PDB structures: RCSB PDB PDBe PDBsum
- Gene Ontology: AmiGO / QuickGO
Search
- PMC: articles
- PubMed: articles
- NCBI: proteins

In enzymology, an adenosylcobinamide-phosphate guanylyltransferase (EC 2.7.7.62) is an enzyme that catalyzes the chemical reaction

GTP + adenosylcobinamide phosphate $\rightleftharpoons$ diphosphate + adenosylcobinamide-GDP

The two substrates of this enzyme are GTP and adenosylcobinamide phosphate; its two products are diphosphate and adenosylcobinamide-GDP.

This enzyme belongs to the family of transferases, specifically those transferring phosphorus-containing nucleotide groups (nucleotidyltransferases). The systematic name of this enzyme class is GTP:adenosylcobinamide-phosphate guanylyltransferase. Other names in common use include CobU, adenosylcobinamide kinase/adenosylcobinamide-phosphate, guanylyltransferase, and AdoCbi kinase/AdoCbi-phosphate guanylyltransferase. This enzyme is part of the biosynthetic pathway to cobalamin (vitamin B_{12}) in bacteria.

== See also ==
- Cobalamin biosynthesis
