= Cyanocobalamin =

Form of vitamin B-12

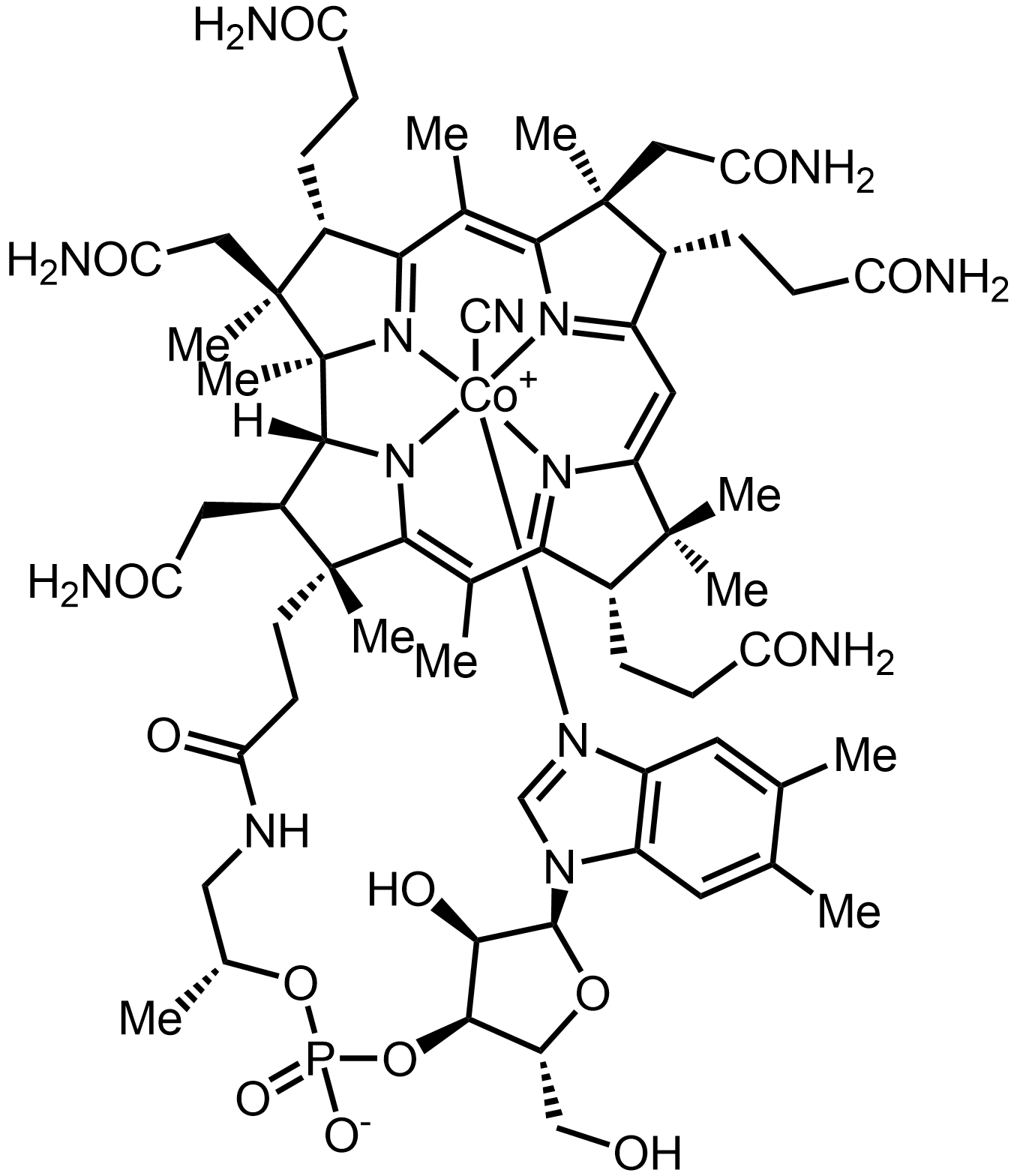
- Skeletal formula

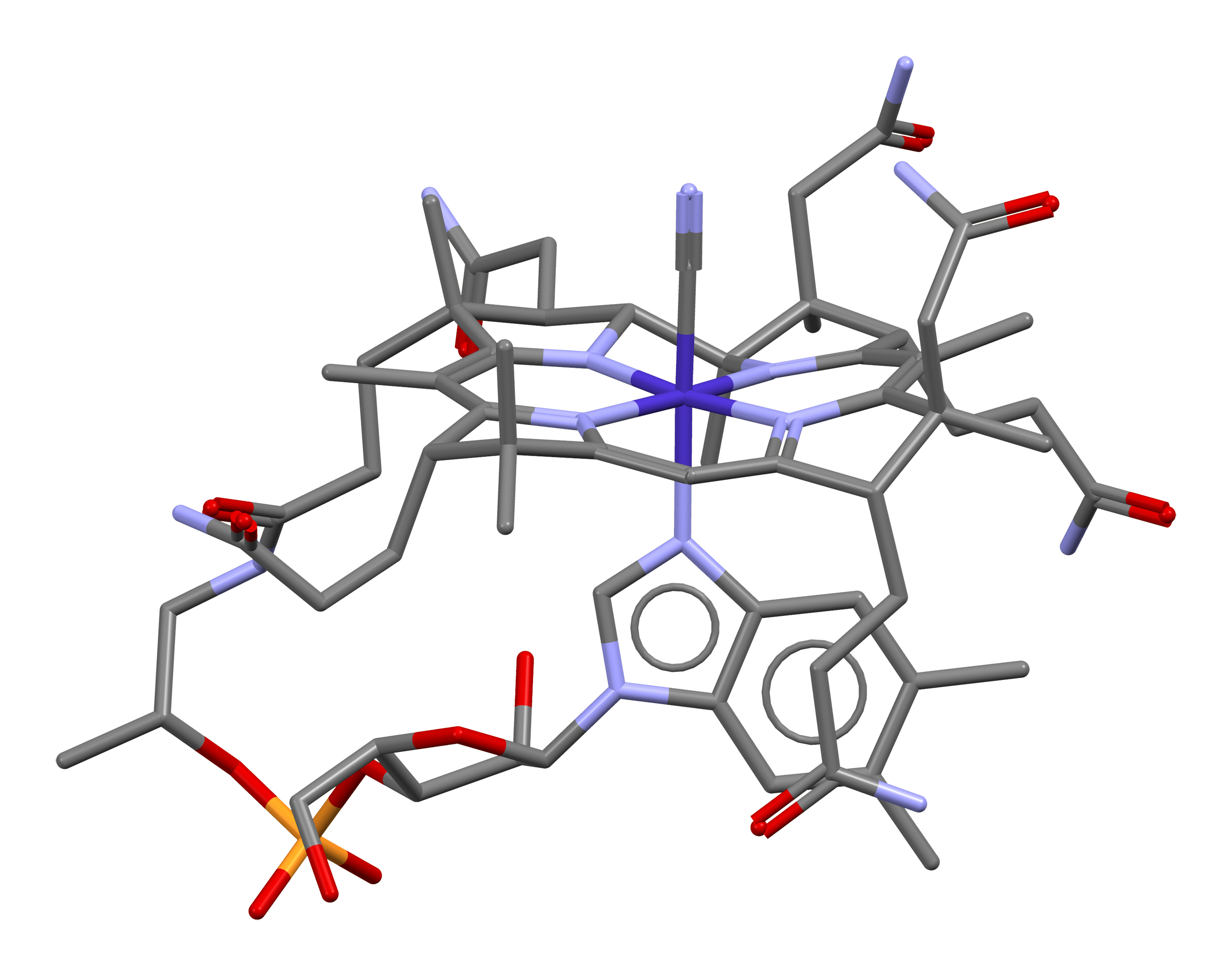
- Stick model of cyanocobalamin based on the crystal structure

Clinical data
- Pronunciation: sye AN oh koe BAL a min
- Trade names: Cobolin-M, Depo-Cobolin, others
- AHFS/Drugs.com: Professional Drug Facts
- MedlinePlus: a604029
- License data: US DailyMed: Cyanocobalamin
- Pregnancy category: AU: Exempt
- Routes of administration: By mouth, intramuscular, nasal spray
- ATC code: B03BA01 (WHO)

Legal status
- Legal status: US: OTC / Rx-only

Identifiers
- IUPAC name: cobalt(3+);[(2R,3S,4R,5S)-5-(5,6-dimethylbenzimidazol-1-yl)-4-hydroxy-2-(hydroxymethyl)oxolan-3-yl] [(2R)-1-[3-[(1R,2R,3R,4Z,7S,9Z,12S,13S,14Z,17S,18S,19R)-2,13,18-tris(2-amino-2-oxoethyl)-7,12,17-tris(3-amino-3-oxopropyl)-3,5,8,8,13,15,18,19-octamethyl-2,7,12,17-tetrahydro-1H-corrin-21-id-3-yl]propanoylamino]propan-2-yl] phosphate;cyanide
- CAS Number: 68-19-9
- PubChem CID: 16212801
- DrugBank: DB00115
- ChemSpider: 24921423
- UNII: P6YC3EG204
- KEGG: D00166
- ChEMBL: ChEMBL2110563
- ECHA InfoCard: 100.000.618

Chemical and physical data
- Formula: C_{63}H_{88}CoN_{14}O_{14}P
- Molar mass: 1355.388 g·mol^{−1}
- 3D model (JSmol): Interactive image
- Melting point: 300 °C (572 °F) +
- Boiling point: 300 °C (572 °F) +
- Solubility in water: 1/80g/ml
- SMILES: CC1=CC2=C(C=C1C)N(C=N2)C3C(C(C(O3)CO)OP(=O)([O-])OC(C)CNC(=O)CCC4(C(C5C6(C(C(C(=C(C7=NC(=CC8=NC(=C(C4=N5)C)C(C8(C)C)CCC(=O)N)C(C7(C)CC(=O)N)CCC(=O)N)C)[N-]6)CCC(=O)N)(C)CC(=O)N)C)CC(=O)N)C)O.[C-]#N.[Co+3]
- InChI: InChI=1S/C62H90N13O14P.CN.Co/c1-29-20-39-40(21-30(29)2)75(28-70-39)57-52(84)53(41(27-76)87-57)89-90(85,86)88-31(3)26-69-49(83)18-19-59(8)37(22-46(66)80)56-62(11)61(10,25-48(68)82)36(14-17-45(65)79)51(74-62)33(5)55-60(9,24-47(67)81)34(12-15-43(63)77)38(71-55)23-42-58(6,7)35(13-16-44(64)78)50(72-42)32(4)54(59)73-56;1-2;/h20-21,23,28,31,34-37,41,52-53,56-57,76,84H,12-19,22,24-27H2,1-11H3,(H15,63,64,65,66,67,68,69,71,72,73,74,77,78,79,80,81,82,83,85,86);;/q;-1;+3/p-2/t31-,34-,35-,36-,37+,41-,52-,53-,56-,57?,59-,60+,61+,62+;;/m1../s1; Key:FDJOLVPMNUYSCM-QJRSUKKJSA-L

Cyanocobalamin is a form of vitamin B_{12} used to treat and prevent vitamin B_{12} deficiency except in the presence of cyanide toxicity. The deficiency may occur in pernicious anemia, following surgical removal of the stomach, with fish tapeworm, or due to bowel cancer. It is given by mouth, by injection into a muscle, or as a nasal spray.

Cyanocobalamin is generally well tolerated. Oral supplements may have minor or no side effects. Minor side effects that may go away with treatment can include skin issues, diarrhea, nausea, upset stomach, and itchiness, and a burning or pain sensation on injection site. Serious side effects may include anaphylaxis. In those with severe anemia getting treatment immediately, low blood potassium, resulting in heart failure, may arise. Use is not recommended in those who are allergic to cobalt or have Leber's disease. With a standard injection (1000 mcg), a 50% to 99% of the dose may excreted, as any excess amount that the body does not need is flushed through the urine. No overdosage or toxicity has been recorded by the FDA. It is less preferred than hydroxocobalamin for treating vitamin B_{12} deficiency because it has a slightly lower bioavailability. Some studies have shown it to possess an antihypotensive effect. Vitamin B_{12} is an essential nutrient meaning that it cannot be made by the body but is required for life.

Cyanocobalamin was first manufactured in the 1940s. It is available as a generic medication and over the counter. In 2023, it was the 104th most commonly prescribed medication in the United States, with more than 6 million prescriptions.

== Medical use ==
Cyanocobalamin is usually prescribed after surgical removal of part or all of the stomach or intestine to ensure adequate serum levels of vitamin B_{12}. It is also used to treat pernicious anemia, vitamin B_{12} deficiency (due to low intake from food or inability to absorb due to genetic or other factors), thyrotoxicosis, hemorrhage, malignancy, liver disease and kidney disease. Cyanocobalamin injections are often prescribed to gastric bypass patients who have had part of their small intestine bypassed, making it difficult for B_{12} to be acquired via food or vitamins. Cyanocobalamin is also used to perform the Schilling test to check ability to absorb vitamin B_{12}.

Cyanocobalamin is also produced in the body (and then excreted via urine) after intravenous hydroxycobalamin is used to treat cyanide poisoning.

== Use in food ==
Cyanocobalamin is added as an ingredient to fortify nutrition in products such as baby formula, breakfast cereals and energy drinks as well as livestock feed.

Endogenous vitamin B_{12} becomes inactive when exposed to hydrogen cyanide and nitric oxide in cigarette smoke. Vitamin B_{12} deficiency can develop with heavy regular use of nitrous oxide N_{2}O, also known as "laughing gas", used for anaesthesia in a clinical setting or as a propellant gas, commonly abused as a recreational drug.

== Side effects ==
Possible side effects of cyanocobalamin injection include allergic reactions such as hives, difficult breathing; redness of the face; swelling of the arms, hands, feet, ankles or lower legs; extreme thirst; and diarrhea. Less-serious side effects may include headache, dizziness, leg pain, itching, or rash.

Treatment of megaloblastic anemia with concurrent vitamin B_{12} deficiency using B_{12} vitamers (including cyanocobalamin), creates the possibility of hypokalemia due to increased erythropoiesis (red blood cell production) and consequent cellular uptake of potassium upon anemia resolution.

When treated with cyanocobalamin, patients with Leber's disease may develop serious optic atrophy, possibly leading to blindness, based on few case reports.

== Chemistry ==
Vitamin B_{12} is the "generic descriptor" name for any vitamers of vitamin B_{12}. Animals, including humans, can convert cyanocobalamin to any one of the active vitamin B_{12} compounds.

Cyanocobalamin is one of the most widely manufactured vitamers in the vitamin B_{12} family (the family of chemicals that function as B_{12} when put into the body), because cyanocobalamin is the most air-stable of the B_{12} forms, and is the easiest to purify after it is produced by bacterial fermentation.

It can be obtained as dark red crystals or as an amorphous red powder. Cyanocobalamin is hygroscopic in the anhydrous form, and sparingly soluble in water (1:80). It is stable to autoclaving for short periods at 121 °C (250 °F). The vitamin B_{12} coenzymes are unstable in light. Vitamin B_{12} additionally becomes inactive when exposed to intense heat or electromagnetic radiation.

Cyanocobalamin powder

=== Chemical reactions ===
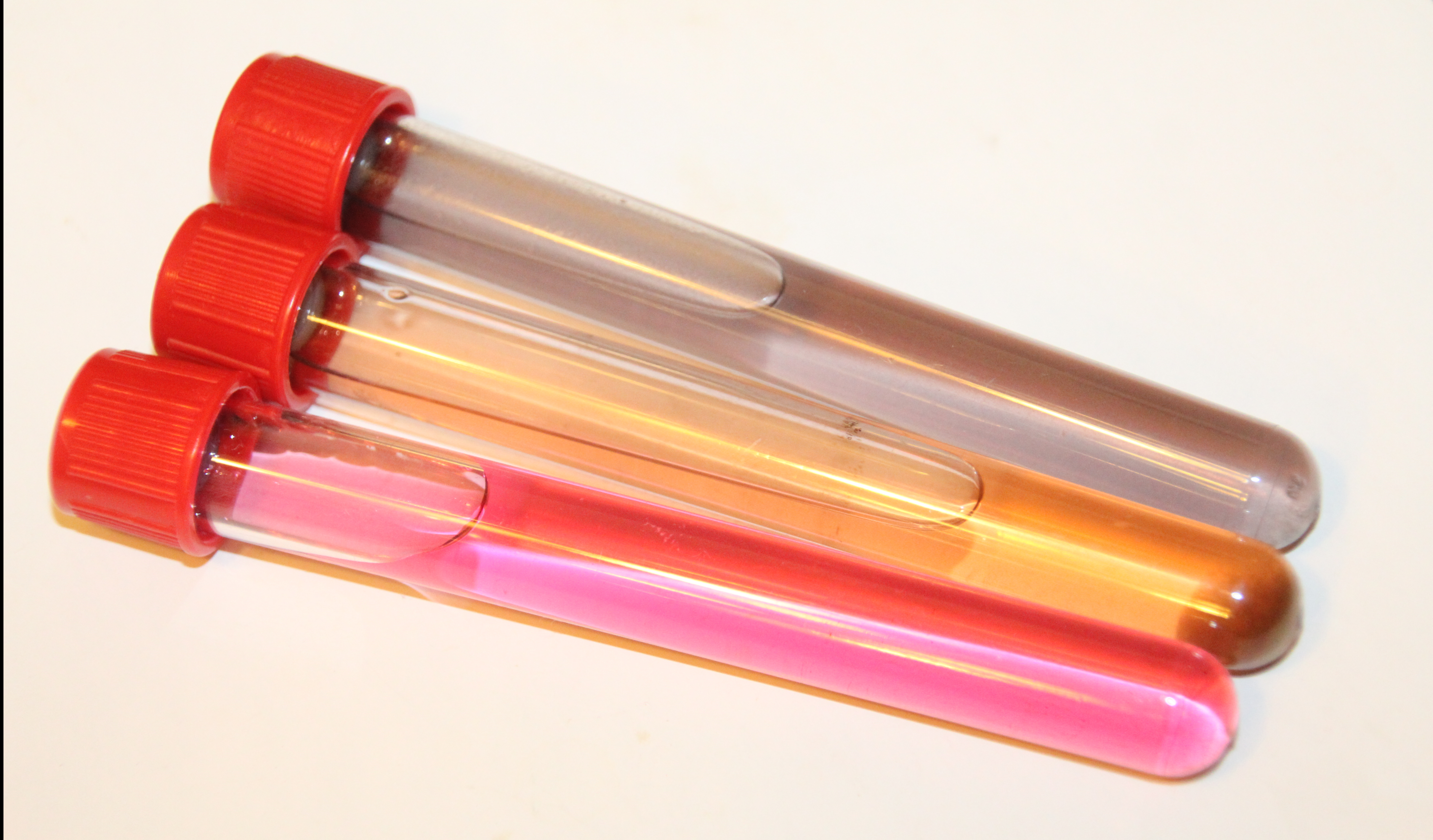
Reduced forms of Cyanocobalamin, with a Co(I) (top), Co(II) (middle), and Co(III) (bottom)

In the cobalamins, cobalt normally exists in the trivalent state, Co(III). However, under reducing conditions, the cobalt center is reduced to Co(II) or even Co(I), which are usually denoted as B_{12r} and B_{12s}, for reduced and super reduced respectively.

B_{12r} and B_{12s} can be prepared from cyanocobalamin by controlled potential reduction, or chemical reduction using sodium borohydride in alkaline solution, zinc in acetic acid, or by the action of thiols. Both B_{12r} and B_{12s} are stable indefinitely under oxygen-free conditions. B_{12r} appears orange-brown in solution, while B_{12s} appears bluish-green under natural daylight, and purple under artificial light.

B_{12s} is one of the most nucleophilic species known in aqueous solution. This property allows the convenient preparation of cobalamin analogs with different substituents, via nucleophilic attack on alkyl halides and vinyl halides.

For example, cyanocobalamin can be converted to its analog cobalamins via reduction to B_{12s}, followed by the addition of the corresponding alkyl halides, acyl halides, alkene or alkyne. Steric hindrance is the major limiting factor in the synthesis of the B_{12} coenzyme analogs. For example, no reaction occurs between neopentyl chloride and B_{12s}, whereas the secondary alkyl halide analogs are too unstable to be isolated. This effect may be due to the strong coordination between benzimidazole and the central cobalt atom, pulling it down into the plane of the corrin ring. The trans effect determines the polarizability of the Co–C bond so formed. However, once the benzimidazole is detached from cobalt by quaternization with methyl iodide, it is replaced by H_{2}O or hydroxyl ions. Various secondary alkyl halides are then readily attacked by the modified B_{12s} to give the corresponding stable cobalamin analogs. The products are usually extracted and purified by phenol-methylene chloride extraction or by column chromatography.

Cobalamin analogs prepared by this method include the naturally occurring coenzymes methylcobalamin and cobamamide, and other cobalamins that do not occur naturally, such as vinylcobalamin, carboxymethylcobalamin and cyclohexylcobalamin. This reaction is under review for use as a catalyst for chemical dehalogenation, organic reagent and photosensitized catalyst systems.

== Production ==
Cyanocobalamin is commercially prepared by bacterial fermentation. Fermentation by a variety of microorganisms yields a mixture of methylcobalamin, hydroxocobalamin and adenosylcobalamin. These compounds are converted to cyanocobalamin by addition of potassium cyanide in the presence of sodium nitrite and heat. Since multiple species of Propionibacterium produce no exotoxins or endotoxins and have been granted GRAS status (generally regarded as safe) by the United States Food and Drug Administration, they are the preferred bacterial fermentation organisms for vitamin B_{12} production.

Historically, the physiological form was initially thought to be cyanocobalamin. This was because hydroxocobalamin produced by bacteria was changed to cyanocobalamin during purification in activated charcoal columns after separation from the bacterial cultures (because cyanide is naturally present in activated charcoal). Cyanocobalamin is the form in most pharmaceutical preparations because adding cyanide stabilizes the molecule.

The total world production of vitamin B_{12}, by four companies (the French Sanofi-Aventis and three Chinese companies) in 2008 was 35 tonnes.

== Metabolism ==
The two bioactive forms of vitamin B_{12} are methylcobalamin in cytosol and adenosylcobalamin in mitochondria. The cyanide is converted to thiocyanate and excreted by the kidney. The MMACHC gene product catalyzes the decyanation of cyanocobalamin as well as the dealkylation of alkylcobalamins including methylcobalamin and adenosylcobalamin. The MMACHC gene product is characterised as a cyanocobalamin reductase (cyanide-eliminating) and an alkylcobalamin reductase. It enables the interconversion of cyano- and alkylcobalamins.

Endogenous vitamin B_{12} becomes inactive when exposed to hydrogen cyanide and nitric oxide in cigarette smoke. More specifically, it causes the active forms to convert to cyanocobalamin, causing a functional deficiency.

Functional vitamin B_{12} deficiency can also develop with heavy regular use of nitrous oxide N_{2}O, also known as "laughing gas", by oxidizing the cobalt atom and inactivating the vitamin. Used for anaesthesia in a clinical setting or as a propellant gas, it's commonly abused as a recreational drug.

The enzymes that use B_{12} as a built-in cofactor are methylmalonyl-CoA mutase (PDB 4REQ) and methionine synthase (PDB 1Q8J).

=== In the cytosol ===
Methylcobalamin and 5-methyltetrahydrofolate are needed by methionine synthase in the methionine cycle to transfer a methyl group from 5-methyltetrahydrofolate to homocysteine, thereby generating tetrahydrofolate (THF) and methionine, which is used to make SAMe. SAMe is the universal methyl donor and is used for DNA methylation and to make phospholipid membranes, choline, sphingomyelin, acetylcholine, and other neurotransmitters.

=== In mitochondria ===
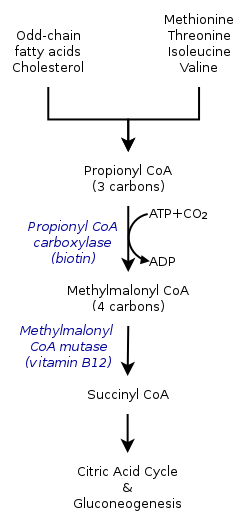
Vitamin B_{12} adenosylcobalamin in mitochondrion—cholesterol and protein metabolism

The metabolism of propionyl-CoA occurs in the mitochondria and requires Vitamin B_{12} (as adenosylcobalamin) to make succinyl-CoA. When the conversion of propionyl-CoA to succinyl-CoA in the mitochondria fails due to Vitamin B_{12} deficiency, elevated blood levels of methylmalonic acid (MMA) occur. Thus, elevated blood levels of homocysteine and MMA may both be indicators of vitamin B_{12} deficiency.

Adenosylcobalamin is needed as cofactor in methylmalonyl-CoA mutase—MUT enzyme. Processing of cholesterol and protein gives propionyl-CoA that is converted to methylmalonyl-CoA, which is used by MUT enzyme to make succinyl-CoA. Vitamin B_{12} is needed to prevent anemia, since making porphyrin and heme in mitochondria for producing hemoglobin in red blood cells depends on succinyl-CoA made by vitamin B_{12}.

=== Absorption and transport ===
Inadequate absorption of vitamin B_{12} may be related to coeliac disease. Intestinal absorption of vitamin B_{12} requires successively three different protein molecules: haptocorrin, intrinsic factor and transcobalamin II.

== See also ==
- Methylcobalamin
- Hydroxocobalamin
- Adenosylcobalamin
- Cobalamin biosynthesis
