= Cob(II)yrinic acid a,c-diamide reductase =

cob(II)yrinic acid a,c-diamide reductase

Identifiers
- EC no.: 1.16.8.1

Databases
- IntEnz: IntEnz view
- BRENDA: BRENDA entry
- ExPASy: NiceZyme view
- KEGG: KEGG entry
- MetaCyc: metabolic pathway
- PRIAM: profile
- PDB structures: RCSB PDB PDBe PDBsum
- Gene Ontology: AmiGO / QuickGO
Search
- PMC: articles
- PubMed: articles
- NCBI: proteins

In enzymology, a cob(II)yrinic acid a,c-diamide reductase (EC 1.16.8.1) is an enzyme that catalyzes the chemical reaction

2 cob(I)yrinic acid a,c-diamide + FMN + 3 H^{+} $\rightleftharpoons$ 2 cob(II)yrinic acid a,c-diamide + FMNH_{2}

The three substrates of this enzyme are cob(I)yrinic acid a,c-diamide, flavin mononucleotide, and H^{+}; its two products are cob(II)yrinic acid a,c-diamide and FMNH2.

== Classification ==
This enzyme belongs to the family of oxidoreductases, specifically those oxidizing metal ion with a flavin as acceptor.

== Nomenclature ==
The systematic name of this enzyme class is cob(I)yrinic acid-a,c-diamide:FMN oxidoreductase. This enzyme is also called CobR and cob(II)yrinic acid-a,c-diamide:FMN oxidoreductase (incorrect).

== Biological role ==
This enzyme is part of the biosynthetic pathway to cobalamin (vitamin B_{12}) in bacteria.

== See also ==
- Cobalamin biosynthesis
