= Glutamine amidotransferase =

Glutamine amidotransferase class-I
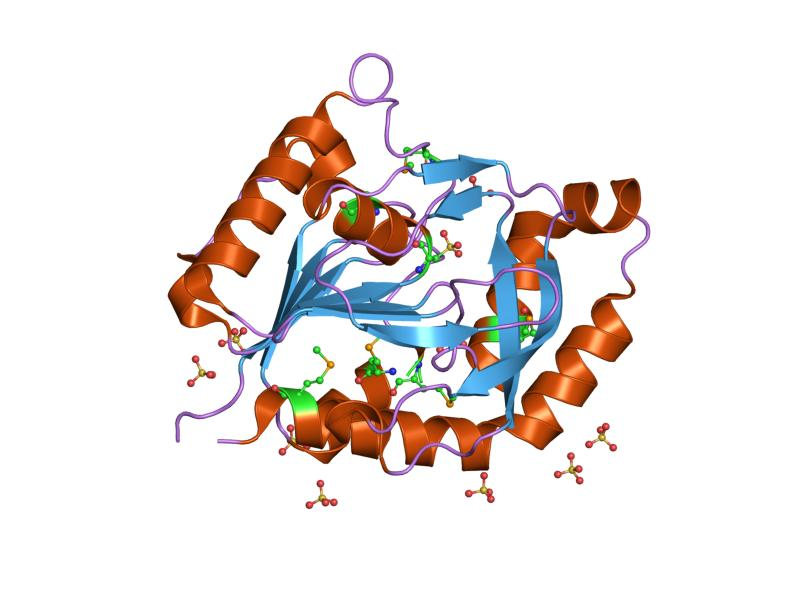
- crystal structure of putative glutamine amido transferase (tm1158) from thermotoga maritima at 1.70 a resolution

Identifiers
- Symbol: GATase
- Pfam: PF00117
- Pfam clan: CL0014
- InterPro: IPR000991
- PROSITE: PDOC00406
- MEROPS: C44
- SCOP2: 1ea0 / SCOPe / SUPFAM
- CDD: cd01653
Available protein structures:
- Pfam: structures / ECOD
- PDB: RCSB PDB; PDBe; PDBj
- PDBsum: structure summary

In molecular biology, glutamine amidotransferases (GATase) are enzymes which catalyse the removal of the ammonia group from a glutamine molecule and its subsequent transfer to a specific substrate, thus creating a new carbon-nitrogen group on the substrate. This activity is found in a range of biosynthetic enzymes, including glutamine amidotransferase, anthranilate synthase component II, p-aminobenzoate, and glutamine-dependent carbamoyl-transferase (CPSase). Glutamine amidotransferase (GATase) domains can occur either as single polypeptides, as in glutamine amidotransferases, or as domains in a much larger multifunctional synthase protein, such as CPSase. On the basis of sequence similarities two classes of GATase domains have been identified: class-I (also known as trpG-type) and class-II (also known as purF-type). Class-I GATase domains are defined by a conserved catalytic triad consisting of cysteine, histidine and glutamate. Class-I GATase domains have been found in the following enzymes: the second component of anthranilate synthase and 4-amino-4-deoxychorismate (ADC) synthase; CTP synthase; GMP synthase; glutamine-dependent carbamoyl-phosphate synthase; phosphoribosylformylglycinamidine synthase II; and the histidine amidotransferase hisH.
