= Pseudomonas denitrificans =

Scientific classification
- Domain: Bacteria
- Kingdom: Pseudomonadati
- Phylum: Pseudomonadota
- Class: Gammaproteobacteria
- Order: Pseudomonadales
- Family: Pseudomonadaceae
- Genus: Pseudomonas
- Species: P. denitrificans

Binomial name
- Pseudomonas denitrificans Bergey, et al. 1961

Type strain
- ATCC 19244 CCEB 525; IAM 12023; NCIMB 1656; NCTC 1656; NRRL B-1028

Species of bacterium

Pseudomonas denitrificans is a Gram-negative aerobic bacterium that performs denitrification. It was first isolated from garden soil in Vienna, Austria. It overproduces cobalamin (vitamin B_{12}), which it uses for methionine synthesis and it has been used for manufacture of the vitamin. Scientists at Rhône-Poulenc Rorer took a genetically engineered strain of the bacteria, in which eight of the cob genes involved in the biosynthesis of the vitamin had been overexpressed, to establish the complete sequence of methylation and other steps in the cobalamin pathway.

Based on 16S rRNA analysis, P. denitrificans has been placed in the P. pertucinogena group.
