= Adenosylcobinamide kinase =

Class of enzymes

adenosylcobinamide kinase

Identifiers
- EC no.: 2.7.1.156

Databases
- BRENDA: enzyme data
- ExPASy: NiceZyme view
- KEGG: enzyme entry
- MetaCyc: metabolic pathway
- Rhea: reactions
- PDB structures: RCSB PDB PDBe PDBsum
- Gene Ontology: AmiGO / QuickGO
Search
- PMC: articles
- PubMed: articles
- NCBI: proteins

In enzymology, an adenosylcobinamide kinase (EC 2.7.1.156) is an enzyme that catalyzes the chemical reaction

RTP + adenosylcobinamide $\rightleftharpoons$ adenosylcobinamide phosphate + RDP

Thus, the two substrates of this enzyme are RTP and adenosylcobinamide, whereas its two products are adenosylcobinamide phosphate and RDP.

This enzyme belongs to the family of transferases, specifically those transferring phosphorus-containing groups (phosphotransferases) with an alcohol group as acceptor. The systematic name of this enzyme class is RTP:adenosylcobinamide phosphotransferase. Other names in common use include CobU, adenosylcobinamide kinase/adenosylcobinamide-phosphate, guanylyltransferase, and AdoCbi kinase/AdoCbi-phosphate guanylyltransferase. This enzyme participates in porphyrin and chlorophyll metabolism.
