= Adenosylcobalamin =

Biologically active form of vitamin B12

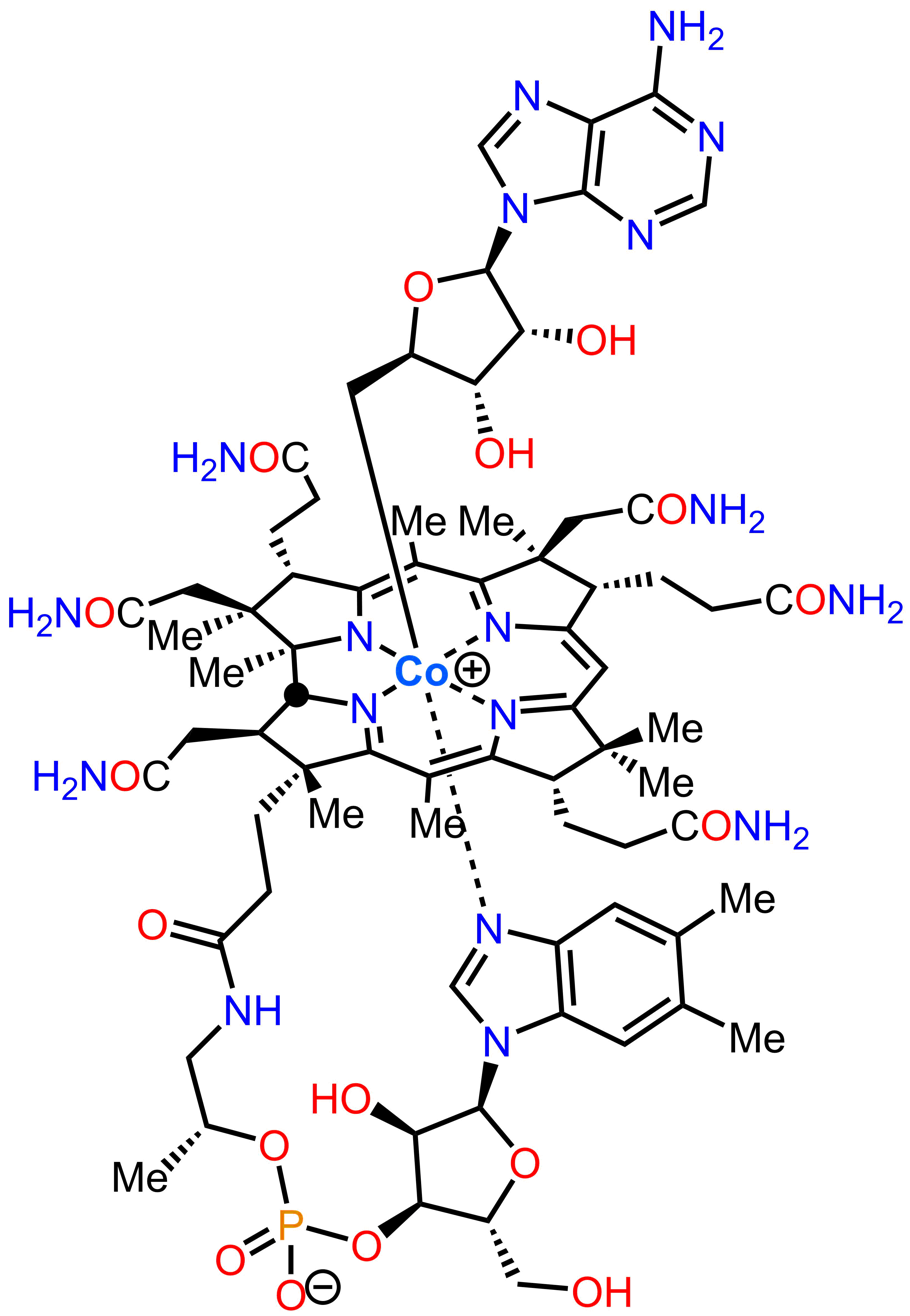

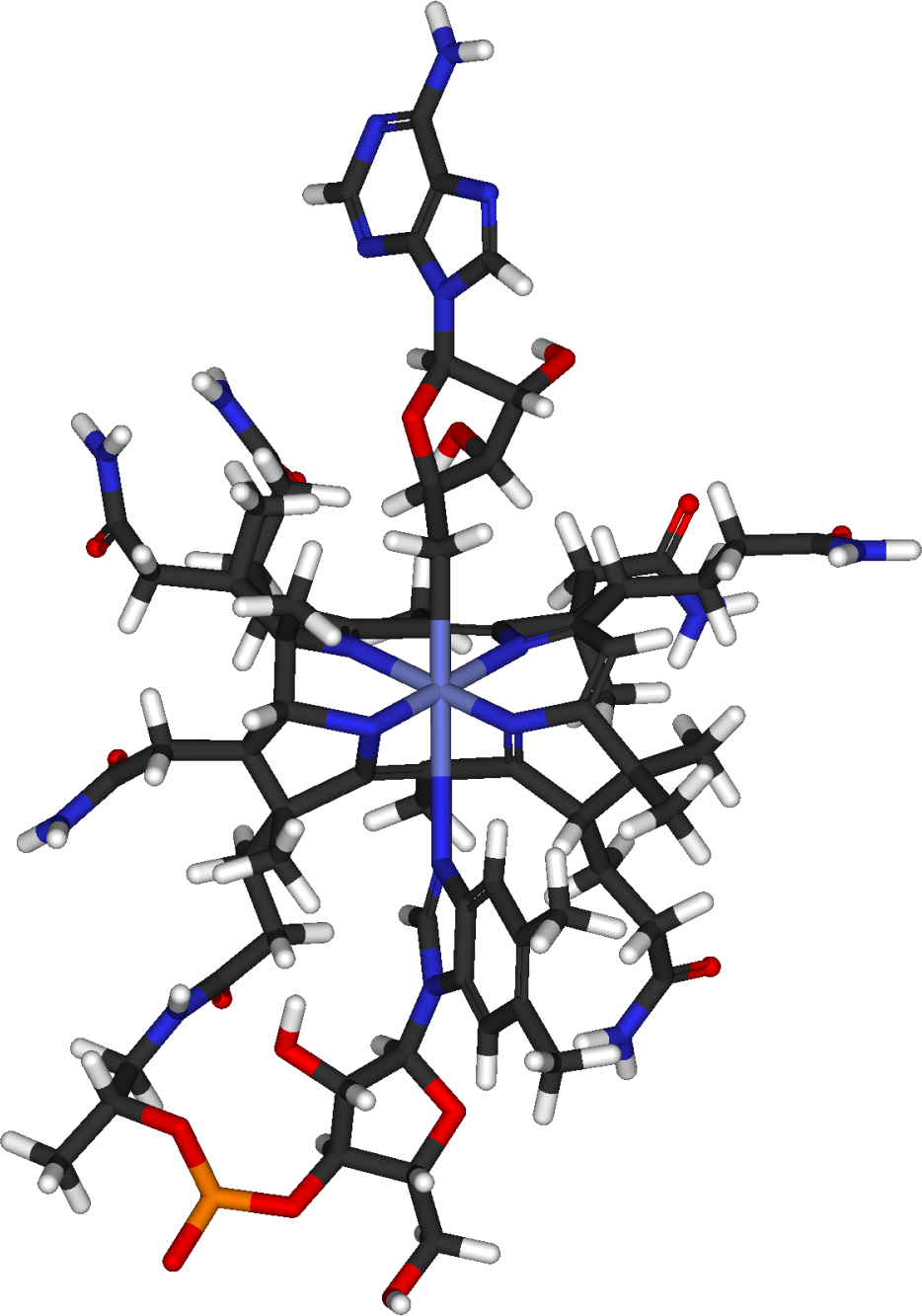

Clinical data
- AHFS/Drugs.com: International Drug Names
- Routes of administration: Oral
- ATC code: B03BA04 (WHO)

Legal status
- Legal status: US: OTC

Identifiers
- IUPAC name: Coα-[α-(5,6-dimethylbenzimidazolyl)]-Coβ- (5'-deoxy-5'-adenosyl)cobamide
- CAS Number: 13870-90-1
- PubChem CID: 5459907
- ChemSpider: 16736117
- UNII: F0R1QK73KB
- KEGG: D00042
- ChEBI: CHEBI:18408
- CompTox Dashboard (EPA): DTXSID1046009
- ECHA InfoCard: 100.034.192

Chemical and physical data
- Formula: C_{72}H_{100}CoN_{18}O_{17}P
- Molar mass: 1579.608 g·mol^{−1}
- InChI: InChI=1S/C62H90N13O14P.C10H12N5O3.Co/c1-29-20-39-40(21-30(29)2)75(28-70-39)57-52(84)53(41(27-76)87-57)89-90(85,86)88-31(3)26-69-49(83)18-19-59(8)37(22-46(66)80)56-62(11)61(10,25-48(68)82)36(14-17-45(65)79)51(74-62)33(5)55-60(9,24-47(67)81)34(12-15-43(63)77)38(71-55)23-42-58(6,7)35(13-16-44(64)78)50(72-42)32(4)54(59)73-56;1-4-6(16)7(17)10(18-4)15-3-14-5-8(11)12-2-13-9(5)15;/h20-21,23,28,31,34-37,41,52-53,56-57,76,84H,12-19,22,24-27H2,1-11H3,(H15,63,64,65,66,67,68,69,71,72,73,74,77,78,79,80,81,82,83,85,86);2-4,6-7,10,16-17H,1H2,(H2,11,12,13);/q;;+2/p-2/t31?,34?,35?,36?,37?,41-,52-,53-,56?,57+,59?,60?,61?,62?;4-,6-,7-,10-;/m11./s1; Key:ZIHHMGTYZOSFRC-CXGXMSGESA-L

Adenosylcobalamin (AdoCbl), also known as coenzyme B_{12}, cobamamide, and dibencozide, is one of the biologically active forms of vitamin B_{12}.

Schematic diagram of the propionate metabolic pathway. Adenosylcobalamin is required as a coenzyme by the methylmalonyl-CoA mutase in order to convert L-methylmalonyl-CoA into succinyl-CoA, otherwise methylmalonic acid accumulates.

Adenosylcobalamin participates as a cofactor in radical-mediated 1,2-carbon skeleton rearrangements. These processes require the formation of the deoxyadenosyl radical through homolytic dissociation of the carbon-cobalt bond. This bond is exceptionally weak, with a bond dissociation energy of 31 kcal/mol, which is further lowered in the chemical environment of an enzyme active site. An enzyme that uses adenosylcobalamin as a coenzyme is methylmalonyl-CoA mutase (MCM).

Further experimentation has also determined adenosylcobalamin's role in regulating expression of some bacterial genes. By binding to CarH, AdoCbl can modulate carotenoid genes, which confer warm colors onto various plants. Carotenoid transcription is activated by sunlight, due to the response from AdoCbl. There are other photoreceptors across different bacterial communities, aside from CarH, that also have reactive capability when bound to AdoCbl. For instance, AerR is another factor that uses AdoCbl to give off purple pigmentation. Additional examination of adenosylcobalamin-bound enzymes and the development of this cofactor over time may prove to hold regulatory function of DNA and RNA.

== See also ==
- Methylcobalamin
- Hydroxocobalamin
- Cyanocobalamin
- Vitamin B12
- Cobalamin biosynthesis
- Nitric oxide
