= Robert F. Schilling =

American physician (1919–2014)

Robert Frederick Schilling, M.D. (1919– 30 September 2014) was a physician best known for his research on Vitamin B_{12}. Schilling was a Professor Emeritus at the University of Wisconsin. He is the namesake of the Schilling test.

== Education and postdoctoral work ==
Schilling received his medical degree from the University of Wisconsin-Madison in Madison, Wisconsin. He received postdoctoral training at Philadelphia General Hospital in West Philadelphia, Boston City Hospital in Boston, and at University of Wisconsin Hospital in Madison, Wisconsin.

== Work with Vitamin B_{12} ==
His work on detection of radio-cobalt-labeled B_{12} in the urine led to a test for vitamin B_{12} absorption named the "Schilling test" in his honor. The Schilling test determines if a patient has pernicious anemia, a disease caused by malabsorption of B_{12} due to lack of intrinsic factor. The Schilling test in a second stage may also be used as a control test for other causes of malabsorption of Vitamin B_{12} even if it is bound to intrinsic factor (B_{12} deficiency which is not pernicious anemia).
