= Schilling test =

Medical test for patients with vitamin B12 deficiency

- Purpose: investigation used for patients with vitamin B_{12} deficiency

The Schilling test was a medical investigation used for patients with vitamin B_{12} (cobalamin) deficiency. The purpose of the test was to determine how well a patient is able to absorb B_{12} from their intestinal tract. The test is now considered obsolete and is rarely performed, and is no longer available at many medical centers. It is named for Robert F. Schilling.

== Process ==
The Schilling test has multiple stages. As noted below, it can be done at any time after vitamin B_{12} supplementation and body store replacement, and some clinicians recommend that in severe deficiency cases, at least several weeks of vitamin repletion be done before the test (more than one B_{12} shot, and also oral folic acid), in order to ensure that impaired absorption of B_{12} (with or without intrinsic factor) is not occurring due to damage to the intestinal mucosa from the B_{12} and folate deficiency themselves.

=== Stage 1: oral vitamin B_{12} plus intramuscular vitamin B_{12} (without IF) ===
In the first part of the test, the patient is given radiolabeled vitamin B_{12} to drink or eat. The most commonly used radiolabels are ^{57}Co and ^{58}Co. An intramuscular injection of unlabeled vitamin B_{12} is given an hour later. This is not enough to replete or saturate body stores of B_{12}. The purpose of the single injection is to temporarily saturate B_{12} receptors in the liver with enough normal vitamin B_{12} to prevent radioactive vitamin B_{12} binding in body tissues (especially in the liver), so that if absorbed from the G.I. tract, it will pass into the urine. The patient's urine is then collected over the next 24 hours to assess the absorption.

Normally, the ingested radiolabeled vitamin B_{12} will be absorbed into the body. Since the body already has liver receptors for transcobalamin/vitamin B_{12} saturated by the injection, much of the ingested vitamin B_{12} will be excreted in the urine.

- A normal result shows at least 10% of the radiolabeled vitamin B_{12} in the urine over the first 24 hours.
- In patients with pernicious anemia or with deficiency due to impaired absorption, less than 10% of the radiolabeled vitamin B_{12} is detected.

The normal test will result in a higher amount of the radiolabeled cobalamin in the urine because it would have been absorbed by the intestinal epithelium, but passed into the urine because all hepatic B_{12} receptors were occupied. An abnormal result is caused by less of the labeled cobalamin to appear in the urine because it will remain in the intestine and be passed into the feces.

=== Stage 2: vitamin B_{12} and intrinsic factor ===
If an abnormality is found, i.e. the B_{12} in the urine is only present in low levels, the test is repeated, this time with additional oral intrinsic factor.

- If this second urine collection is normal, this shows a lack of intrinsic factor production. This is by definition pernicious anemia.
- A low result on the second test implies abnormal intestinal absorption (malabsorption), which could be caused by coeliac disease, biliary disease, Whipple's disease, small bowel bacterial overgrowth syndrome, fish tapeworm infestation (Diphyllobothrium latum), or liver disease. Malabsorption of B_{12} can be caused by intestinal dysfunction from a low vitamin level in-and-of-itself (see below), causing test result confusion if repletion has not been done for some days previously.

=== Stage 3: vitamin B_{12} and antibiotics ===
This stage is useful for identifying patients with bacterial overgrowth syndrome. The physician will provide a course of 2 weeks of antibiotics to eliminate any possible bacterial overgrowth and repeat the test to check whether radio-labeled Vitamin B_{12} would be found in urine or not.

=== Stage 4: vitamin B_{12} and pancreatic enzymes ===
This stage, in which pancreatic enzymes are administered, can be useful in identifying patients with pancreatic insufficiency. The physician will give 3 days of pancreatic enzymes followed by repeating the test to check if radio-labeled Vitamin B12 would be detected in urine.

=== Combined stage 1 and stage 2 ===
In some versions of the Schilling test, B_{12} can be given both with and without intrinsic factor at the same time, using different cobalt radioisotopes ^{57}Co and ^{58}Co, which have different radiation signatures, in order to differentiate the two forms of B_{12}. This is performed with the 'Dicopac' kitset. This allows for only a single radioactive urine collection.

== Complications ==
Note that the B_{12} shot which begins the Schilling test is enough to go a considerable way toward treating B_{12} deficiency, so the test is also a partial treatment for B_{12} deficiency. Also, the classic Schilling test can be performed at any time, even after full B_{12} repletion and correction of the anemia, and it will still show if the cause of the B_{12} deficiency was intrinsic-factor related. In fact, some clinicians have suggested that folate and B_{12} replacement for several weeks be normally performed before a Schilling test is done, since folate and B_{12} deficiencies are both known to interfere with intestinal cell function, and thus cause malabsorption of B_{12} on their own, even if intrinsic factor is being made. This state would then tend to cause a false-positive test for both simple B_{12} and intrinsic factor-related B_{12} malabsorption. Several weeks of vitamin replacement are necessary, before epithelial damage to the G.I. tract from B_{12} deficiency is corrected.

Many labs have stopped performing the Schilling test, due to lack of production of the cobalt radioisotopes and labeled-B_{12} test substances. Also, injection replacement of B_{12} has become relatively inexpensive, and can be self-administered by patients, as well as megadose oral B_{12}. Since these are the same treatments which would be administered for most causes of B_{12} malabsorption even if the exact cause were identified, the diagnostic test may be omitted without damage to the patient (so long as follow-up treatment and occasional serum B_{12} testing is not allowed to lapse).

It is possible for use of other radiopharmaceuticals to interfere with interpretation of the test.

== Diagnoses ==
Part 1 test result	Part 2 test result	Diagnosis
Normal	-	Normal or dietary vitamin B_{12} deficiency
Low	Normal	Problems with intrinsic factor production, e.g. Pernicious anemia
Low	Low	Malabsorption (terminal ileum)
