= Pernicious anemia =

Lack of red blood cells due to vitamin B12 deficiency

- Other names: Vitamin B_{12} deficiency anemia, Biermer's anemia, Addison's anemia, Addison–Biermer anemia
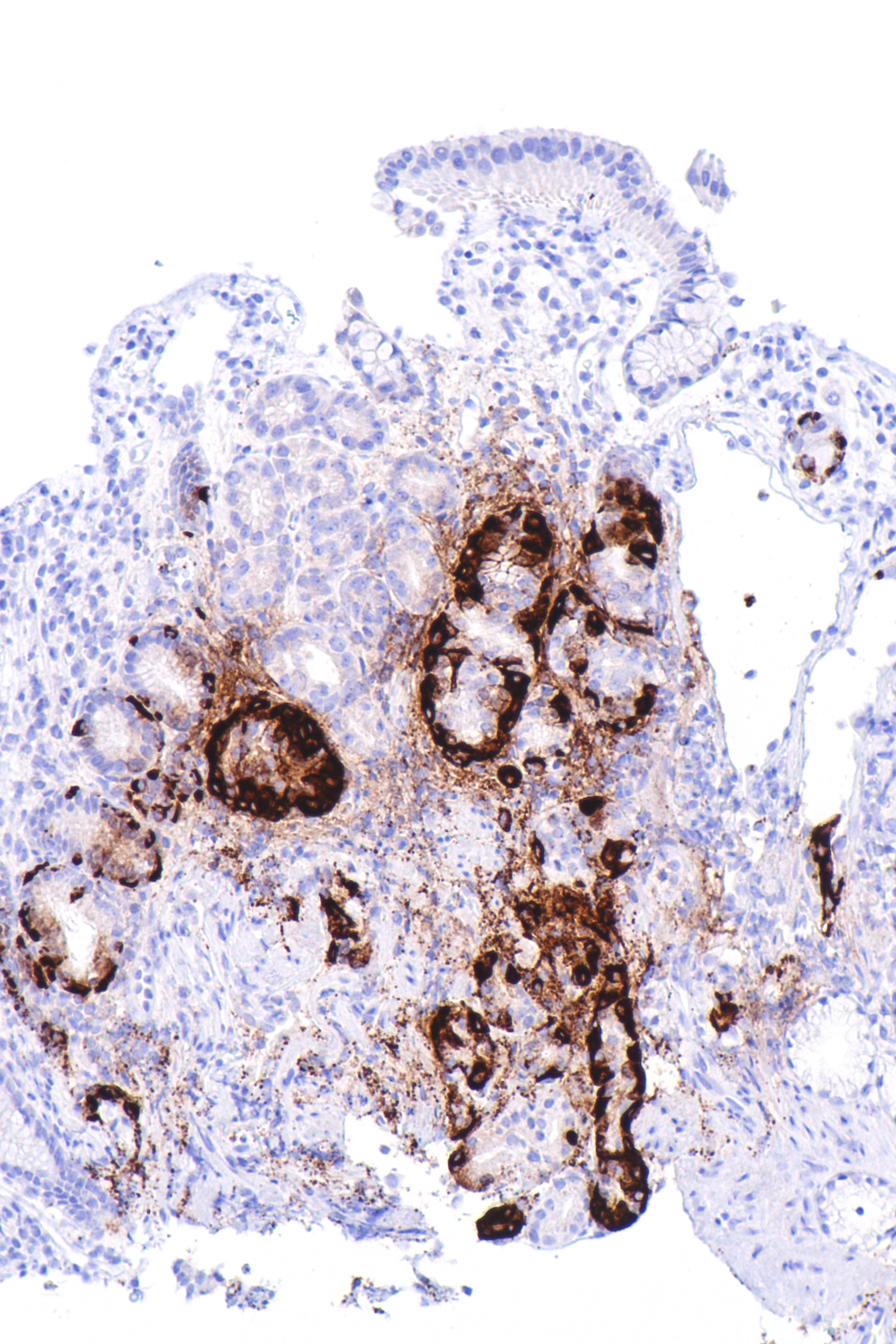
- Micrograph showing nodular enterochromaffin-like cell hyperplasia, as demonstrated with chromogranin A immunostaining, in the body of the stomach. Parietal cells are not readily apparent. These changes are in keeping with autoimmune metaplastic atrophic gastritis, a histologic correlate of vitamin B_{12} deficiency anemia.
- Specialty: Hematology
- Symptoms: Feeling tired, shortness of breath, pale skin, numbness in the hands and feet, confusion, poor reflexes
- Usual onset: Any age, particularly those over 60 years old
- Causes: Not enough intrinsic factor
- Diagnostic method: Blood tests, bone marrow tests
- Treatment: Vitamin B_{12} injections
- Prognosis: With treatment a normal life
- Frequency: 1 per 1000 people

Pernicious anemia is a disease where not enough red blood cells are produced due to a deficiency of vitamin B_{12}. Those affected often have a gradual onset. The most common initial symptoms are feeling tired and weak. Other symptoms may include rapid breathing, feeling faint, mouth ulcers, sore tongue, pale skin, chest pain, loss of appetite, upset stomach, numbness in hands and feet, difficulty walking, muscle weakness, blurred vision, slow thinking, memory loss, clumsiness, depression, and confusion. Without treatment, some of these problems may become permanent.

Pernicious anemia refers to a type of vitamin B_{12} deficiency anemia that results from lack of intrinsic factor. Lack of intrinsic factor is most commonly due to an autoimmune attack on the cells that create it in the stomach. It can also occur following the surgical removal of all or part of the stomach or small intestine; from an inherited disorder or illnesses that damage the stomach lining. When suspected, diagnosis is made by blood tests initially a complete blood count, and occasionally, bone marrow tests. Blood tests may show fewer but larger red blood cells, low numbers of young red blood cells, low levels of vitamin B_{12}, and antibodies to intrinsic factor. Diagnosis is not always straightforward and can be challenging.

Because pernicious anemia is due to a lack of intrinsic factor, it is not preventable. Pernicious anemia can be treated with injections of vitamin B_{12}. If the symptoms are serious, frequent injections are typically recommended initially. There are not enough studies on whether pills are effective in improving or eliminating symptoms. Often, treatment may be needed for life.

Pernicious anemia is the most common cause of clinically evident vitamin B_{12} deficiency worldwide. Pernicious anemia due to autoimmune problems occurs in about one per 1000 people in the US. Among those over the age of 60, about 2% have the condition. It more commonly affects people of northern European descent. Women are more commonly affected than men. With proper treatment, most people live normal lives. Due to a higher risk of stomach cancer, those with pernicious anemia should be checked regularly for this. The first clear description was by Thomas Addison in 1849. The term "pernicious" means "deadly", and this term came into use because, before the availability of treatment, the disease was often fatal.

== Signs and symptoms ==
Pernicious anemia often presents slowly, and can cause harm insidiously and unnoticeably. Untreated, it can lead to neurological complications, and in serious cases, death. The onset may be vague and slow and the condition can be confused with other conditions, and there may be few to many symptoms without anemia. Pernicious anemia may be present without a person experiencing symptoms at first, over time, feeling tired and weak, lightheadedness, dizziness, headaches, rapid heartbeat, rapid breathing, sore tongue, mouth ulcers, cold hands and feet, pale or yellow skin, cold intolerance, chest pain, upset stomach, loss of appetite, diarrhea, constipation, joint pain, and abnormal sensations including tingling or numbness to the fingers and toes (pins and needles), and tinnitus, and decreased ability to think, may occur.

In more severe or prolonged cases of pernicious anemia, nerve cell damage may occur.

This may result in symptoms that can include:

- sensory loss, such as, loss of sensation in the feet
- difficulty in proprioception
- uncontrollable muscle movements or trouble walking or talking
- changes in reflexes
- confusion, decreased consciousness, clumsiness, memory loss, and dementia
- mood or mental changes, such as, depression, irritability, or anxiety, and, in more severe, psychosis
- vision problems
- loss of smell and taste
- difficult urination

Anemia may present with a number of further common symptoms, including altered blood pressure, hair thinning and loss, early greying of the hair, bleeding gums, angular cheilitis, low-grade fevers, a look of exhaustion with pale and dehydrated or cracked lips and dark circles around the eyes, as well as brittle nails. Anemia may also lead to cardiac murmurs. Anemia may result in fertility problems. The deficiency may also present with thyroid disorders. In severe cases, the anemia may cause congestive heart failure. A complication of severe chronic PA is subacute combined degeneration of spinal cord, which leads to distal sensory loss (posterior column), absent ankle reflex, increased knee reflex response, and extensor plantar reflex response. Other than anemia, hematological symptoms may include cytopenias, intramedullary hemolysis, and pseudothrombotic microangiopathy. Vitamin B_{12} deficiency, which is reversible, is occasionally confused with acute myeloid leukemia, which is an irreversible condition presenting with some of the same hematological symptoms, including hypercellular bone marrow with blastic differentiation and hypersegmented neutrophils. Pernicious anemia can cause osteoporosis and may lead to bone fractures. Pernicious anemia can contribute to a delay in physical growth in children, and may also be a cause for delay in puberty for adolescents.

== Causes ==
Vitamin B_{12} cannot be produced by the human body, and must be obtained from the diet. When foods containing B_{12} are eaten, the vitamin is usually bound to protein and is released by proteases released by the pancreas into the small bowel. Following its release, most B_{12} is absorbed by the body in the small bowel (ileum) after binding to a protein known as intrinsic factor. Intrinsic factor is produced by parietal cells of the gastric mucosa (stomach lining) and the intrinsic factor-B_{12}-complex is absorbed by enterocytes in the ileum's cubam receptors. PA is characterised by B_{12} deficiency caused by the absence of intrinsic factor. Other disorders that can disrupt the absorption of vitamin B_{12} in the small intestine include coeliac disease, surgical removal, Crohn's disease, and HIV.

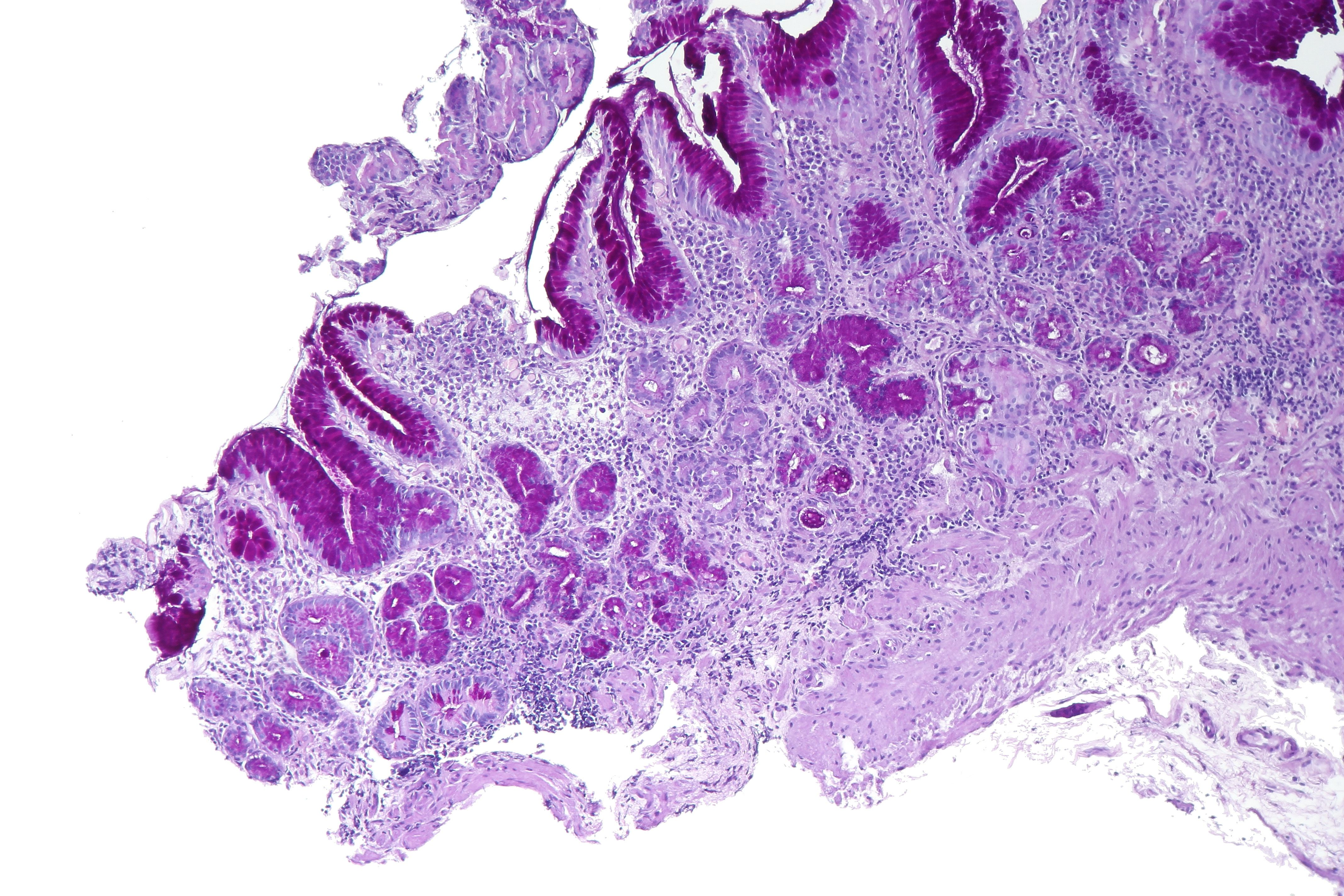
Atrophic gastritis showing patchy atrophy of oxyntic mucosa

PA may be considered as an end stage of autoimmune atrophic gastritis, a disease characterised by stomach atrophy and the presence of antibodies to parietal cells and intrinsic factor. Autoimmune atrophic gastritis, is localised to the body of the stomach, where parietal cells are located. Antibodies to intrinsic factor and parietal cells cause the destruction of the oxyntic gastric mucosa, in which the parietal cells are located, leading to the subsequent loss of intrinsic factor synthesis. Without intrinsic factor, the ileum can no longer absorb the B_{12}. Atrophic gastritis is often a precursor to gastric cancer.

Although the exact role of Helicobacter pylori infection in PA remains controversial, evidence indicates H. pylori is involved in the pathogenesis of the disease. A long-standing H. pylori infection may cause gastric autoimmunity by a mechanism known as molecular mimicry. Antibodies produced by the immune system can be cross-reactive and may bind to both H. pylori antigens and those found in the gastric mucosa. The antibodies are produced by activated B cells that recognise both pathogen and self-derived peptides. The autoantigens believed to cause the autoreactivity are the alpha and beta subunits of the sodium-potassium pump. In a study, B_{12} deficiency caused by Helicobacter pylori was positively correlated with CagA positivity and gastric inflammatory activity, rather than gastric atrophy. Less commonly, H. pylori and Zollinger-Ellison syndrome may cause a form of nonautoimmune gastritis that can lead to pernicious anemia.

Impaired B_{12} absorption can also occur following gastric removal (gastrectomy) or gastric bypass surgery. In these surgeries, either the parts of the stomach that produce gastric secretions are removed or they are bypassed. This means intrinsic factor, as well as other factors required for B_{12} absorption, are not available. However, B_{12} deficiency after gastric surgery does not usually become a clinical issue. This is probably because the body stores many years' worth of B_{12} in the liver and gastric surgery patients are adequately supplemented with the vitamin.

Although no specific PA susceptibility genes have been identified, a genetic factor likely is involved in the disease. Pernicious anemia is often found in conjunction with other autoimmune disorders, suggesting common autoimmune susceptibility genes may be a causative factor. In spite of that, previous family studies and case reports focusing on PA have suggested that there is a tendency of genetic heritance of PA in particular, and close relatives of the PA patients seem to have higher incidence of PA and associated PA conditions. Moreover, it was further indicated that the formation of antibodies to gastric cells was autosomal dominant gene determined, and the presence of antibodies to the gastric cells might not be necessarily related to the occurrence of atrophic gastritis related to PA.

== Pathophysiology ==
Although the healthy body stores three to five years' worth of B_{12} in the liver, the usually undetected autoimmune activity in one's gut over a prolonged period of time leads to B_{12} depletion and the resulting anemia; pernicious anemia refers to one of the hematologic manifestations of chronic auto-immune gastritis, in which the immune system targets the parietal cells of the stomach or intrinsic factor itself, leading to decreased absorption of vitamin B_{12}. The body needs enough intrinsic factor to absorb and reabsorb vitamin B_{12} from the bile, the lack of which reduces the time needed to develop a deficiency.

B_{12} is required by enzymes for two reactions: the conversion of methylmalonyl-CoA to succinyl-CoA, and the conversion of homocysteine to methionine. In the latter reaction, the methyl group of levomefolic acid is transferred to homocysteine to produce tetrahydrofolate and methionine. This reaction is catalyzed by the enzyme methionine synthase with B_{12} as an essential cofactor. During B_{12} deficiency, this reaction cannot proceed, which leads to the accumulation of levomefolic acid. This accumulation depletes the other types of folate required for purine and thymidylate synthesis, which are required for the synthesis of DNA. Inhibition of DNA replication in maturing red blood cells results in the formation of large, fragile megaloblastic erythrocytes. The neurological aspects of the disease are thought to arise from the accumulation of methylmalonyl- CoA due to the requirement of B_{12} as a cofactor to the enzyme methylmalonyl-CoA mutase.

== Diagnosis ==
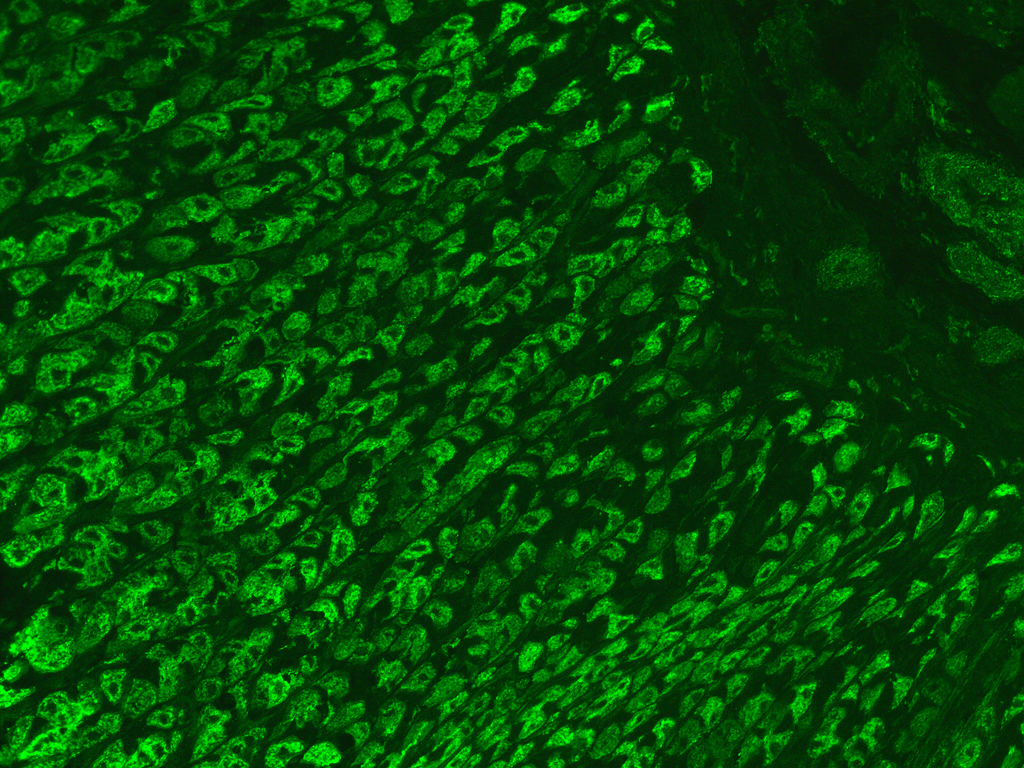
Immunofluorescence staining pattern of gastric parietal cell antibodies on a stomach section

The insidious nature of PA may mean that diagnosis is delayed. Diagnosis is not always straightforward and can be challenging and can take up to several years to receive a diagnosis from the onset of symptoms and almost 60% of those affected are misdiagnosed or not initially diagnosed at all. PA may be suspected when a patient's blood smear shows large, fragile, immature erythrocytes, known as megaloblasts. A diagnosis of PA first requires demonstration of megaloblastic anemia by conducting a full blood count and blood smear, which evaluates the mean corpuscular volume (MCV), as well the mean corpuscular hemoglobin concentration (MCHC). PA is identified with a high MCV (macrocytic anemia) and a normal MCHC (normochromic anemia). Ovalocytes are also typically seen on the blood smear, and a pathognomonic feature of megaloblastic anemias (which include PA and others) is hypersegmented neutrophils. Neuropsychiatric symptoms can precede hematological signs and are often the presenting manifestation of the disease.

Vitamin B_{12} serum levels are used to detect its deficiency, but do not distinguish its causes. Vitamin B_{12} levels can be falsely high or low and data for sensitivity and specificity vary widely. Normal serum levels may be found in cases of deficiency where myeloproliferative disorders, liver disease, transcobalamin II, or small intestinal bacterial overgrowth are present. Low levels of serum vitamin B_{12} may be caused by other factors than B_{12} deficiency, such as folate deficiency, pregnancy, oral contraceptive use, haptocorrin deficiency, and myeloma. High serum levels may caused by supplementing with vitamin B_{12}, present of antibodies to intrinsic factor, or due to underlying condition.

The presence of antibodies to gastric parietal cells and intrinsic factor is common in PA. Parietal cell antibodies are found in other autoimmune disorders and also in up to 10% of healthy individuals. However, around 85% of PA patients have parietal cell antibodies, which means they are a sensitive marker for the disease. Intrinsic factor antibodies are much less sensitive than parietal cell antibodies, but they are much more specific. They are found in about half of PA patients and are very rarely found in other disorders. These antibody tests can distinguish between PA and food-B_{12} malabsorption.

A buildup of certain metabolites occurs in B_{12} deficiency due to its role in metabolic processes and cellular functions. Methylmalonic acid (MMA) can be measured in both the blood and urine, whereas homocysteine is only measured in the blood. An increase in both MMA and homocysteine distinguishes B_{12}deficiency from folate deficiency because homocysteine alone increases in the latter.

Elevated gastrin levels can be found in around 80–90% of PA cases, but they may also be found in other forms of gastritis. Decreased pepsinogen I levels or a decreased pepsinogen I to pepsinogen II ratio may also be found, although these findings are less specific to PA and can be found in food-B_{12} malabsorption and other forms of gastritis.

The diagnosis of atrophic gastritis type A should be confirmed by gastroscopy and stepwise biopsy. About 90% of individuals with PA have antibodies for parietal cells; however, only 50% of all individuals in the general population with these antibodies have pernicious anemia.

=== Differential diagnosis ===
Forms of vitamin B_{12} deficiency other than PA must be considered in the differential diagnosis of megaloblastic anemia. For example, a B_{12}-deficient state which causes megaloblastic anemia and which may be mistaken for classical PA may be caused by infection with the tapeworm Diphyllobothrium latum, possibly due to the parasite's competition with host for vitamin B_{12}.

The classic test for PA, the Schilling test, is no longer widely used, as more efficient methods are available. This historic test consisted, in its first step, of taking an oral dose of radiolabelled vitamin B_{12}, followed by quantitation of the vitamin in the patient's urine over a 24-hour period via measurement of the radioactivity. A second step of the test repeats the regimen and procedure of the first step, with the addition of oral intrinsic factor. A patient with PA presents lower than normal amounts of intrinsic factor; hence, addition of intrinsic factor in the second step results in an increase in vitamin B_{12} absorption (over the baseline established in the first). The Schilling test distinguished PA from other forms of B_{12} deficiency, specifically, from Imerslund–Gräsbeck syndrome, a B_{12}-deficiency caused by mutations in CUBN that codes for cubilin the cobalamin receptor.

Vitamin B_{12} deficiency is also prevalent in patients having Crohn's disease, so it should be differentiated.

== Treatment ==
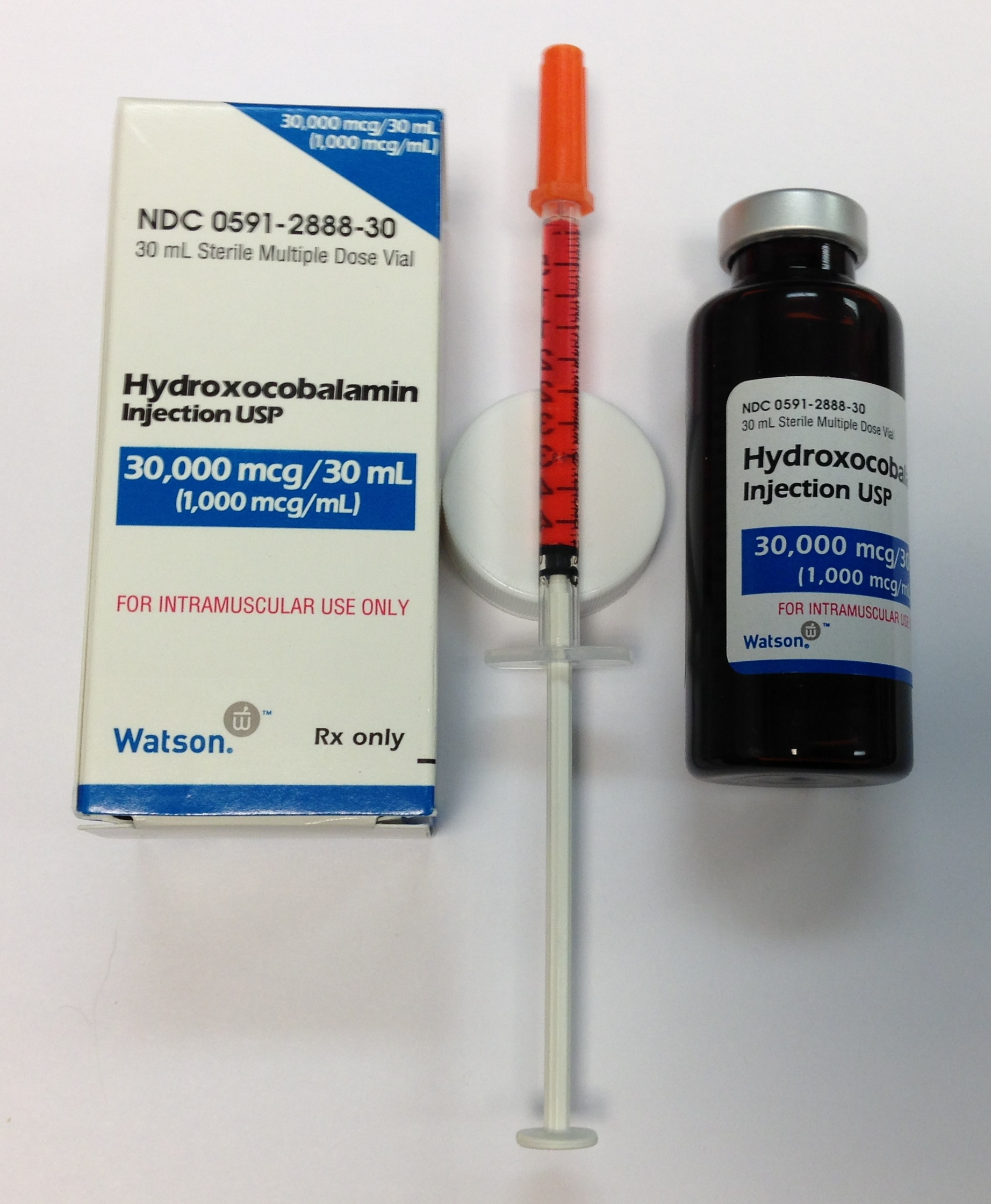
Hydroxocobalamin injection usp(1000 mcg/ml) is a clear red liquid solution of hydroxocobalamin which is available in a 30-ml brown glass multidose vial packaged in a paper box. Shown is 500 mcg B-12 (as 1/2 cc) drawn up in a 0.5-cc U-100 27 gauge x 1/2" insulin syringe, as prepared for subcutaneous injection.

Pernicious anemia can easly be treated with intramuscular injections of vitamin B_{12}. Initially in high daily doses, followed by less frequent lower doses, as the condition improves. Without early treatment, some or all neurological problems may become permanent. In more serious cases of anemia, a blood transfusion may be needed to resolve haematological effects. Treatment is lifelong.

There are not enough studies on whether pills are as effective in improving or eliminating symptoms as intramuscular injections. Folate supplementation may affect the course and treatment of pernicious anemia if vitamin B_{12} not replaced.

== Prognosis ==
A person with well-treated PA can live a healthy life. Failure to diagnose and treat in time, however, may result in permanent neurological damage, excessive fatigue, depression, memory loss, and other complications. In severe cases, the neurological complications of pernicious anemia can lead to death.

There is an increased risk of gastric cancer in those with pernicious anemia linked to the common feature of atrophic gastritis.

== Epidemiology ==
PA is estimated to affect 0.1% of the general population and 1.9% of those over 60, accounting for 20–50% of B_{12} deficiency in adults. A review of literature shows that the prevalence of PA is higher in Northern Europe, especially in Scandinavian countries, and among people of African descent, and that increased awareness of the disease and better diagnostic tools might play a role in apparently higher rates of incidence.

== History ==
A case of anemia with a first recognition of associated atrophic gastritis a feature of pernicious anemia, was first described in 1824 by James Combe. This was fully investigated in 1849, by British physician Thomas Addison, from which it acquired the common name of Addison's anemia. In 1871, the first accurate description of the disease in continental Europe was made by Michael Anton Biermer, a German physician who noted the insidious course of the condition. Because it was untreatable and fatal at the time, he first referred to it as "pernicious" anemia. Russell coined the term subacute combined degeneration of spinal cord.

In 1907, Richard Clarke Cabot reported on a series of 1,200 patients with PA; their average survival was between one and three years. Pernicious anemia was a fatal disease before about the year 1920; until the importance of the liver in hematopoiesis was recognized, the treatment of pernicious anemia was unsuccessful and arbitrary. It may have motivated George Whipple, who had a keen interest in liver diseases, to investigate the liver's role in hematopoiesis. Whipple began evaluating the effects of treatments for anemia caused by chronic blood loss. Whipple, Huber, and Robchett studied the effects on hemoglobin and blood regeneration of a variety of treatments, among which only raw liver showed real promise. Serendipity is said to have played a role in this discovery. Whipple observed that blood regeneration was poor in dogs fed cooked liver after chronic blood loss. Had it not been that a lazy laboratory technician gave the dogs raw liver, the much more dramatic response might not have been discovered then.

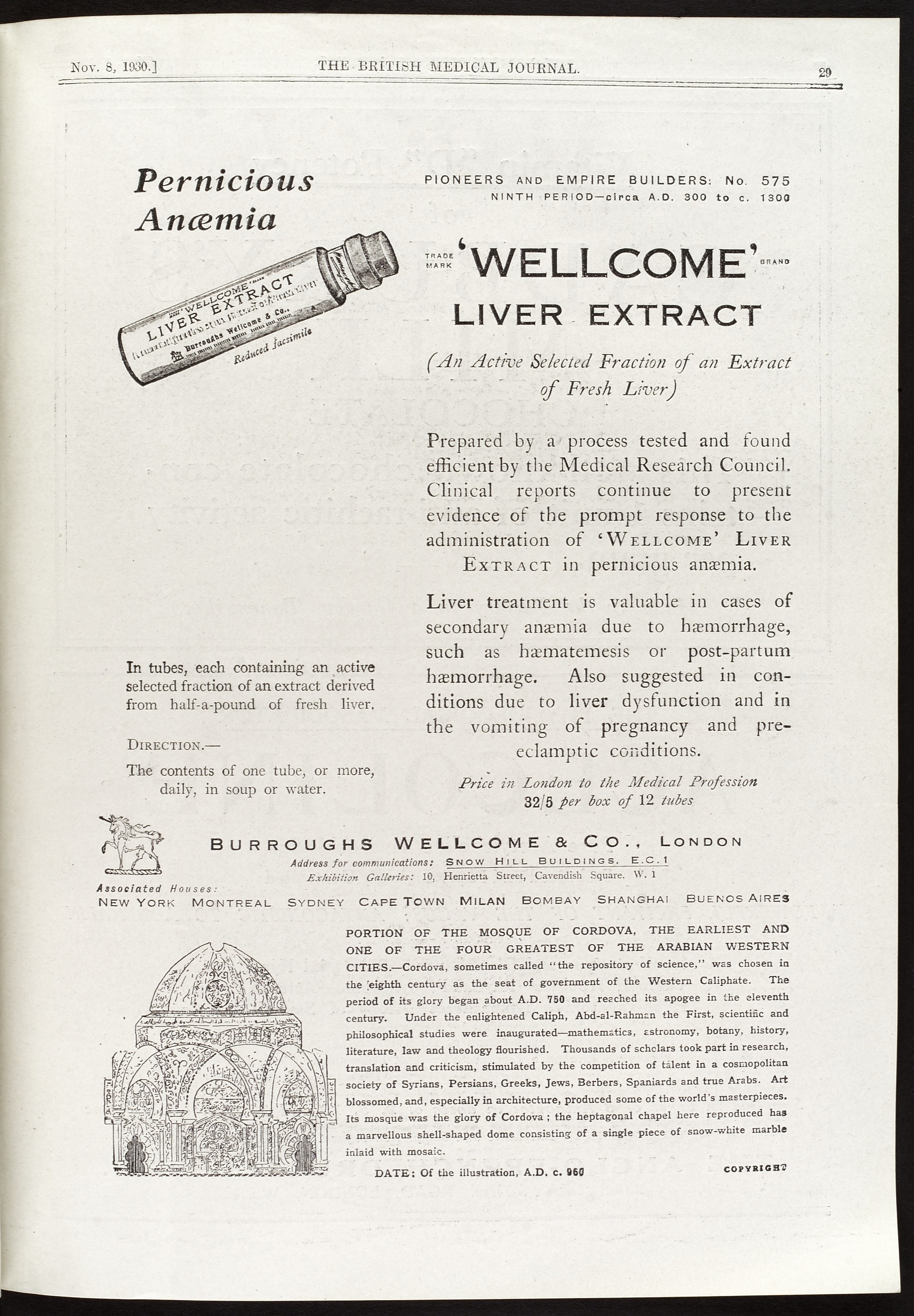
1930 advert for liver extract to treat pernicious anemia

Around 1926, George Minot and William P. Murphy, who learned of Whipple's discovery, sought raw liver as a treatment for pernicious anemia. They later suggested a high-protein diet with high amounts of raw liver. This caused a rapid improvement in symptoms and a simultaneous rise in red blood cell counts. Fruit and iron were also part of the diet, and it appears that at this point, Minot and Murphy were not quite sure that the liver was a very important factor. It was thought that iron in liver tissue, not liver juice-soluble factor, cured hemorrhagic anemia in dogs. Thus, the discovery of liver juice as a treatment for pernicious anemia had been by coincidence. However, Minot, Murphy, and Whipple received the joint Nobel Prize for discovering a cure for a previously fatal disease of unknown cause in 1934, becoming the first Americans to be awarded the Nobel Prize in Physiology and Medicine.

It is not easy to eat uncooked liver, and extracts were developed as a concentrate of liver juice for intramuscular injection. In 1928, chemist Edwin Cohn prepared an extract that was 50 to 100 times stronger than obtained from raw liver. This became part of the standard management of pernicious anemia until the 1950s. The active ingredient in the liver remained unknown until 1948. The anti-pernicious anemia factor was only isolated from the liver by Smith, Rex, and others. The substance was cobalamin, which the discoverers called "vitamin B_{12}". They showed that giving a few micrograms could prevent relapse in the disease. Dorothy Hodgkin and co-workers went on to use X-ray crystallography to elucidate the structure of cobalamin for which she, too, was awarded a Nobel Prize.

Understanding of the pathogenesis of pernicious anaemia increased over subsequent decades. It had long been known that the disease was associated with defects in the gastrointestinal tract: patients had chronic gastritis and lack of acid secretion (achlorhydria). It is known that transport of physiological amounts of vitamin B_{12} depends on the combined actions of gastric, ileal and pancreatic components. The gastric moiety was discovered and named 'intrinsic factor' by William Castle in 1930. A further important advance was made in the early 1960s by Doniach with the recognition that pernicious anemia is an autoimmune disease. Pernicious anemia is eventually treated with only injections of B_{12}; injections are typically 1 mg every other day, or twice weekly.

A medical author takes the view that Mary Todd Lincoln, the wife of American President Abraham Lincoln, had pernicious anemia for decades and died from it in 1882.

== Research ==
=== Permeation enhancers ===
Treatment using oral drugs is an easier option in management but the bioavailability of vitamin B_{12} is low. This is due to low absorption in the intestine, and breakdown by enzyme activity. Research continues to focus on the use of permeation enhancers or permeation absorbers in combination with the treatment. One of the better performing enhancers studied is salcoprozate sodium (SNAC). SNAC is able to form a noncovalent complex with cobalamin while preserving its chemical integrity and protect vitamin B_{12} from gastric acidity. This complex is much more lipophilic than the water-soluble vitamin B_{12}, so is able to pass through cellular membranes with greater ease. Molecular dynamics are used in experiments to gain an understanding of the molecular interactions involved in the different molecules used and the degree of ease achieved in absorption across the gastric epithelium.
