= SACD =

SACD may stand for:

- Super Audio CD, a form of digital audio storage
- Société des Auteurs et Compositeurs Dramatiques, a French society representing authors and their work
- SAC-D, Argentine satellite
- Subacute combined degeneration of spinal cord, caused by vitamin B12 deficiency
