= Robert Schilling =

Robert Schilling may refer to:

- Robert F. Schilling (1919–2014), American physician known for his research on vitamin B_{12}
- Bobby Schilling (Robert Todd Schilling, born 1964), American businessman and politician
- Robert Schilling (historian) (1913–2004), French historian and Latinist
