= Subacute combined degeneration of spinal cord =

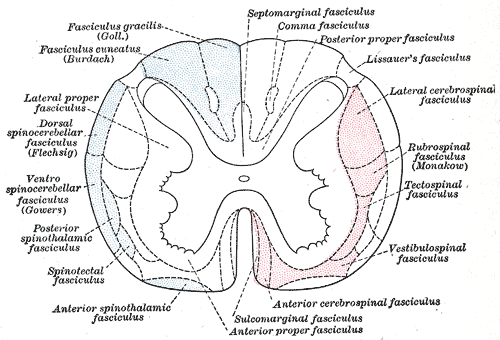
- Diagram of the principal fasciculi of the spinal cord. (In subacute combined degeneration of spinal cord, the "combined" refers to the fact that the dorsal columns and lateral corticospinal tracts are both affected, in contrast to tabes dorsalis which is selective for the dorsal columns.)
- Specialty: Neurology

Subacute combined degeneration of spinal cord, also known as myelosis funiculus, or funicular myelosis, also Lichtheim's disease, and Putnam-Dana syndrome, refers to degeneration of the posterior and lateral columns of the spinal cord as a result of vitamin B_{12} deficiency (most common). It may also occur similarly as result of vitamin E deficiency, and copper deficiency. It is usually associated with pernicious anemia.

== Signs and symptoms ==
The onset is gradual and uniform. The pathological findings of subacute combined degeneration consist of patchy losses of myelin in the dorsal and lateral columns. Patients present with weakness of the legs, arms, and trunk, and tingling and numbness that progressively worsens. Vision changes and change of mental state may also be present. Bilateral spastic paresis may develop and pressure, vibration, and touch sense are diminished. A positive Babinski sign may be seen. Prolonged deficiency of vitamin B_{12} leads to irreversible nervous system damage. HIV-associated vacuolar myelopathy can present with a similar pattern of dorsal column and corticospinal tract demyelination.

It has been thought that if someone is deficient in vitamin B_{12} and folic acid, the vitamin B_{12} deficiency must be treated first. However, the basis for this has been challenged, although due to ethical considerations it is no longer able to be tested if "neuropathy is made more severe as a result of giving folic acid to vitamin B_{12}- deficient individuals". And that if this were the case, then the mechanism remains unclear.

Administration of nitrous oxide anesthesia can precipitate subacute combined degeneration in people with subclinical vitamin B_{12} deficiency, while chronic nitrous oxide exposure can cause it even in persons with normal B_{12} levels. Posterior column dysfunction decreases vibratory sensation and proprioception (joint sense). Lateral corticospinal tract dysfunction produces spasticity and dorsal spinocerebellar tract dysfunction causes ataxia.

== Cause ==
In general, the most common cause of this condition is a deficiency of vitamin B_{12}. This may be due to a dietary deficiency, malabsorption in the terminal ileum, lack of intrinsic factor secreted from gastric parietal cells, or low gastric pH inhibiting attachment of intrinsic factor to ileal receptors. The disease can also be caused by inhalation of nitrous oxide, which inactivates vitamin B12.

Vitamin E deficiency, which is associated with malabsorption disorders such as cystic fibrosis and Bassen-Kornzweig syndrome, can cause a similar presentation due to the degeneration of the dorsal columns.

== Diagnosis ==
Serum vitamin B_{12}, methylmalonic acid, Schilling test, and a complete blood count, looking for megaloblastic anemia if there is also folic acid deficiency or macrocytic anemia. The Schilling test is no longer available in most areas.

MRI-T2 images may reveal increased signal within the white matter of the spinal cord, predominantly in the posterior columns and possibly in the spinothalamic tracts.

== Treatment ==
Therapy with vitamin B_{12} results in partial to full recovery where SACD has been caused by vitamin B_{12} deficiency, depending on the duration and extent of neurodegeneration.
