= Vitamin B12 =

Class of vitamins

Vitamin B_{12}
- General skeletal formula of cobalamins

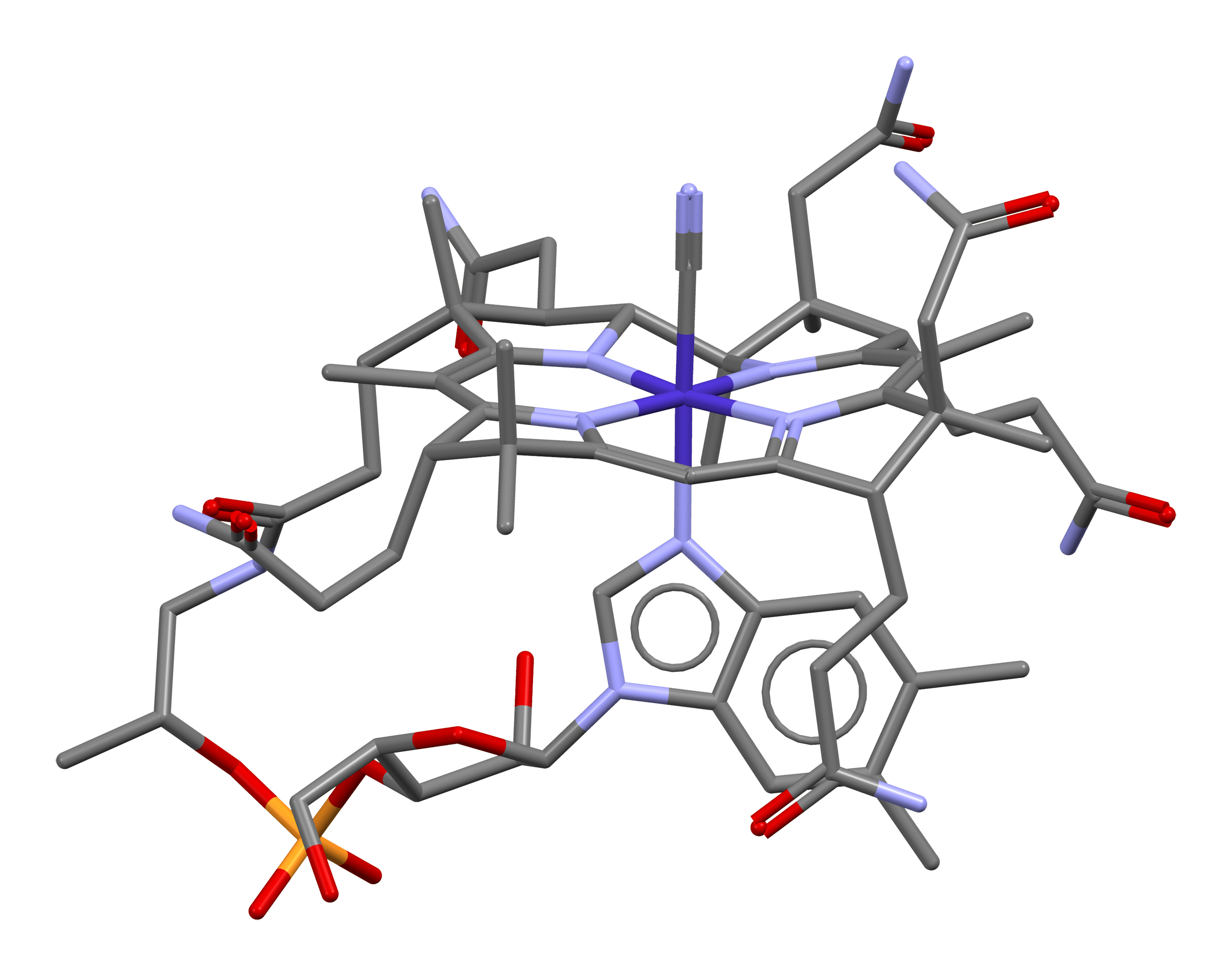
- Stick model of cyanocobalamin (R = CN) based on the crystal structure

Clinical data
- Other names: Vitamin B12, vitamin B-12, cobalamin
- AHFS/Drugs.com: Monograph
- MedlinePlus: a605007
- License data: US DailyMed: Vitamin_b12
- Routes of administration: By mouth, sublingual, intravenous (IV), intramuscular (IM), intranasal
- ATC code: B03BA01 (WHO)

Legal status
- Legal status: UK: OTC; US: OTC

Pharmacokinetic data
- Bioavailability: Readily absorbed in the distal half of the ileum.
- Protein binding: Very high to specific transcobalamins plasma proteins. Binding of hydroxocobalamin is slightly higher than cyanocobalamin.
- Metabolism: Liver
- Elimination half-life: Approximately 6 days (400 days in the liver).
- Excretion: Kidney

Identifiers
- IUPAC name: α-(5,6-Dimethylbenzimidazolyl)cobamidcyanide
- CAS Number: 68-19-9
- PubChem CID: 184933
- DrugBank: DB00115
- ChemSpider: 10469504
- UNII: P6YC3EG204
- KEGG: D00166
- ChEMBL: ChEMBL2110563

Chemical and physical data
- Formula: C_{63}H_{88}CoN_{14}O_{14}P
- Molar mass: 1355.388 g·mol^{−1}
- 3D model (JSmol): Interactive image
- SMILES: NC(=O)C[C@@]8(C)[C@H](CCC(N)=O)C=2/N=C8/C(/C)=C1/[C@@H](CCC(N)=O)[C@](C)(CC(N)=O)[C@@](C)(N1[Co+]C#N)[C@@H]7/N=C(C(\C)=C3/N=C(/C=2)C(C)(C)[C@@H]3CCC(N)=O)[C@](C)(CCC(=O)NCC(C)OP([O-])(=O)O[C@@H]6[C@@H](CO)O[C@H](n5cnc4cc(C)c(C)cc45)[C@@H]6O)[C@H]7CC(N)=O
- InChI: InChI=1S/C62H90N13O14P.CN.Co/c1-29-20-39-40(21-30(29)2)75(28-70-39)57-52(84)53(41(27-76)87-57)89-90(85,86)88-31(3)26-69-49(83)18-19-59(8)37(22-46(66)80)56-62(11)61(10,25-48(68)82)36(14-17-45(65)79)51(74-62)33(5)55-60(9,24-47(67)81)34(12-15-43(63)77)38(71-55)23-42-58(6,7)35(13-16-44(64)78)50(72–42)32(4)54(59)73–56;1–2;/h20-21,23,28,31,34-37,41,52-53,56-57,76,84H,12-19,22,24-27H2,1-11H3,(H15,63,64,65,66,67,68,69,71,72,73,74,77,78,79,80,81,82,83,85,86);;/q;;+2/p-2/t31?,34-,35-,36-,37+,41-,52-,53-,56-,57+,59-,60+,61+,62+;;/m1../s1; Key:RMRCNWBMXRMIRW-WYVZQNDMSA-L

Vitamin B_{12}, also known as cobalamin, is a B vitamin and essential human micronutrient. Vitamin B_{12} is needed in the metabolism of every cell in the body, and has many vital functions, particularly, DNA synthesis. It plays an essential role in the nervous system by supporting myelin synthesis and for the maturation of red blood cells in the bone marrow. It serves also as a vital cofactor in both fatty acid and amino acid metabolism. As humans cannot make it, it is required for life.

Animals require B_{12} but plants do not, relying instead on alternative enzymatic pathways. Vitamin B_{12} is the most chemically complex of all vitamins, and is synthesized exclusively by certain archaea and bacteria. Natural food sources include meat, shellfish, liver, fish, poultry, eggs, and dairy products. It is also added to many breakfast cereals through food fortification and is available in dietary supplement and pharmaceutical forms. Supplements are commonly taken orally but may be administered via intramuscular injection to treat deficiencies.

In healthy adults, vitamin B_{12} deficiency is not common, mainly because body stores of the vitamin are substantial and turnover is slow, with relatively low dietary requirements. However, B_{12} deficiency in the elderly is a significant concern, and is related to dementia. The most common cause in developed countries is impaired absorption due to loss of gastric intrinsic factor (IF), required for absorption. A related cause is reduced stomach acid production with age or from long-term use of proton-pump inhibitors, H_{2} blockers, or other antacids, and interaction with metformin. Elderly people – due to impaired intestinal absorption – and children, premenopausal women, and pregnant women whose diets are low in animal foods are all at increased risk.

Deficiency is especially harmful in pregnancy, childhood, and older adults. It can lead to neuropathy, and a type of anemia in which red blood cells become abnormally large. This can result in tiredness, numbness and tingling, poor appetite, difficulty walking, depression, disorientation, and memory loss. In infants, untreated deficiency may result in neurological impairment and anemia. Maternal deficiency increases the risk of miscarriage, neural tube defects, and delayed development in offspring. Folate levels may modify the presentation of symptoms and disease course.

== Definition ==
Vitamin B_{12} is a coordination complex of cobalt, which occupies the center of a corrin ligand and is further bound to a benzimidazole ligand and adenosyl group. Several related species behave similarly to function as vitamins. This collection of compounds is sometimes referred to as "cobalamins". These chemical compounds have a similar molecular structure, each of which shows vitamin activity in a vitamin-deficient biological system. They are referred to as vitamers having vitamin activity as a coenzyme, meaning that its presence is required for some enzyme-catalyzed reactions.

- adenosylcobalamin
- cyanocobalamin, the adenosyl ligand in vitamin B_{12} is replaced by cyanide.
- hydroxocobalamin, the adenosyl ligand in vitamin B_{12} is replaced by a hydroxide.
- methylcobalamin, the adenosyl ligand in vitamin B_{12} is replaced by a methyl group.

Cyanocobalamin is a manufactured form of B_{12}. Bacterial fermentation creates AdoB_{12} and MeB_{12}, which are converted to cyanocobalamin by the addition of potassium cyanide in the presence of sodium nitrite and heat. Once consumed, cyanocobalamin is converted to the biologically active AdoB_{12} and MeB_{12}. The two bioactive forms of vitamin B_{12} are methylcobalamin in cytosol and adenosylcobalamin in mitochondria.

Cyanocobalamin is the most common form used in dietary supplements and food fortification because cyanide stabilizes the molecule against degradation. Methylcobalamin is also offered as a dietary supplement. There is no advantage to the use of adenosylcobalamin or methylcobalamin forms for the treatment of vitamin B_{12} deficiency.

Hydroxocobalamin can be injected intramuscularly to treat vitamin B_{12} deficiency. It can also be injected intravenously for the purpose of treating cyanide poisoning, as the hydroxyl group is displaced by cyanide, creating a non-toxic cyanocobalamin that is excreted in urine.

=== Pseudovitamins and antivitamins ===
Pseudovitamin B_{12} refers to compounds that are corrinoids with a structure similar to the vitamin, but without vitamin activity. Pseudovitamin B_{12} is the majority corrinoid in spirulina, an algal dietary supplement sometimes erroneously claimed as having this vitamin activity.

Antivitamin B_{12} compounds (often synthetic B_{12} analogues) not only have no vitamin action, but also actively interfere with the activity of true vitamin B_{12}. The design of these compounds mainly involves the replacement of the metal ion with rhodium, nickel, or zinc, or may have an inactive ligand attached, such as 4-ethylphenyl. These compounds have the potential for use in analyzing B_{12} pathways or even attacking B_{12}-dependent pathogens.

== Deficiency ==
Vitamin B_{12} deficiency can potentially cause severe and irreversible damage, especially to the brain and nervous system. At levels only slightly below normal, deficiency can result in fatigue, headaches, feeling faint, rapid breathing, pale skin, numbness or tingling, poor appetite, heartburn, poor balance, difficulty walking, poor reflexes, blurred vision, memory problems, depression, irritability, inattention, cognitive decline, dementia, and even psychosis. Among other problems, weakened immunity, reduced fertility and interruption of blood circulation in women may occur. It has also been linked to optic nerve atrophy and neuritis.

The main type of vitamin B_{12} deficiency anemia is pernicious anemia, characterized by a triad of symptoms:

1. Anemia with bone marrow promegaloblastosis (megaloblastic anemia). This is due to the inhibition of DNA synthesis (specifically purines and thymidine).
2. Gastrointestinal symptoms: alteration in bowel motility, such as mild diarrhea or constipation, and loss of bladder or bowel control. These are thought to be due to defective DNA synthesis inhibiting replication in tissue sites with a high turnover of cells. This may also be due to the autoimmune attack on the parietal cells of the stomach in pernicious anemia. There is an association with gastric antral vascular ectasia (which can be referred to as watermelon stomach), and pernicious anemia.
3. Neurological symptoms: sensory or motor deficiencies (absent reflexes, diminished vibration or soft touch sensation) and subacute combined degeneration of the spinal cord. Deficiency symptoms in children include developmental delay, regression, irritability, involuntary movements and hypotonia.

Vitamin B_{12} deficiency is most commonly caused by malabsorption, but can also result from low intake, immune gastritis, low presence of binding proteins, or use of certain medications. Vegans—people who choose to not consume any animal-sourced foods—are at risk because plant-sourced foods do not contain the vitamin in sufficient amounts to prevent vitamin deficiency. Vegetarians—people who consume animal byproducts such as milk and eggs, but not meat or organs—are also at risk. Vitamin B_{12} deficiency has been observed in between 40% and 80% of the vegetarian population who do not also take a vitamin B_{12} supplement or consume vitamin-fortified food. In Hong Kong and India, vitamin B_{12} deficiency has been found in roughly 80% of the vegan population. As with vegetarians, vegans can avoid this by consuming a dietary supplement or eating B_{12} fortified food such as cereal, plant-based milks, and nutritional yeast as a regular part of their diet. The elderly are at increased risk because they tend to produce less stomach acid as they age, a condition known as achlorhydria, thereby increasing their probability of B_{12} deficiency due to reduced absorption.

Nitrous oxide overdose or overuse converts the active monovalent form of vitamin B_{12} to the inactive bivalent form.

=== Pregnancy, lactation, and early childhood ===
The U.S. Recommended Dietary Allowance (RDA) for pregnancy is 2.6 micrograms per day (μg/d), for lactation 2.8 μg/d. Determination of these values was based on an RDA of 2.4 μg/d for non-pregnant women, plus what will be transferred to the fetus during pregnancy and what will be delivered in breast milk. However, looking at the same scientific evidence, the European Food Safety Authority (EFSA) sets adequate intake (AI) at 4.5 μg/d for pregnancy and 5.0 μg/d for lactation. Low maternal vitamin B_{12}, defined as serum concentration less than 148 pmol/L, increases the risk of miscarriage, preterm birth and newborn low birth weight. During pregnancy the placenta concentrates B_{12}, so that newborn infants have a higher serum concentration than their mothers. As it is recently absorbed vitamin content that more effectively reaches the placenta, the vitamin consumed by the mother-to-be is more important than that contained in her liver tissue.

Women who consume little animal-sourced food, or who are vegetarian or vegan, are at higher risk of becoming vitamin depleted during pregnancy than those who consume more animal products. This depletion can lead to anemia, and also an increased risk that their breastfed infants become vitamin deficient. Vitamin B_{12} is not one of the supplements recommended by the World Health Organization for healthy women who are pregnant, however, vitamin B_{12} is often suggested during pregnancy in a multivitamin along with folic acid especially for pregnant mothers who follow a vegetarian or vegan diet.

Low vitamin concentrations in human milk occur in families with low socioeconomic status or low consumption of animal products. Only a few countries, primarily in Africa, have mandatory food fortification programs for either wheat flour or maize flour; India has a voluntary fortification program. What the nursing mother consumes is more important than her liver tissue content, as it is recently absorbed vitamin that more effectively reaches breast milk. Breast milk B_{12} decreases over months of nursing in both well-nourished and vitamin-deficient mothers. Exclusive or near-exclusive breastfeeding beyond six months is a strong indicator of low serum vitamin status in nursing infants. This is especially true when the vitamin status is poor during the pregnancy and if the early-introduced foods fed to the still-breastfeeding infant are vegan.

The risk of deficiency persists if the post-weaning diet is low in animal products. Signs of low vitamin levels in infants and young children can include anemia, poor physical growth, and neurodevelopmental delays. Children diagnosed with low serum B_{12} can be treated with intramuscular injections, then transitioned to an oral dietary supplement.

=== Gastric bypass surgery ===
Various methods of gastric bypass or gastric restriction surgery are used to treat morbid obesity. Roux-en-Y gastric bypass surgery (RYGB) but not sleeve gastric bypass surgery or gastric banding, increases the risk of vitamin B_{12} deficiency and requires preventive post-operative treatment with either injected or high-dose oral supplementation. For post-operative oral supplementation, 1000 μg/d may be needed to prevent vitamin deficiency.

=== Diagnosis ===
According to one review: "At present, no 'gold standard' test exists for the diagnosis of vitamin B_{12} deficiency and as a consequence the diagnosis requires consideration of both the clinical state of the patient and the results of investigations." The vitamin deficiency is typically suspected when a routine complete blood count shows anemia with an elevated mean corpuscular volume (MCV). In addition, on the peripheral blood smear, macrocytes and hypersegmented polymorphonuclear leukocytes may be seen. Diagnosis is supported based on vitamin B_{12} blood levels below 150–180 pmol/L (200–250 pg/mL) in adults. However, serum values can be maintained while tissue B_{12} stores are becoming depleted. Therefore, serum B_{12} values above the cut-off point of deficiency do not necessarily confirm adequate B_{12} status. For this reason, elevated serum homocysteine over 15 micromol/L and methylmalonic acid (MMA) over 0.271 micromol/L are considered better indicators of B_{12} deficiency, rather than relying only on the concentration of B_{12} in blood. However, elevated MMA is not conclusive, as it is seen in people with B_{12} deficiency, but also in elderly people who have renal insufficiency, and elevated homocysteine is not conclusive, as it is also seen in people with folate deficiency. In addition, elevated methylmalonic acid levels may also be related to metabolic disorders such as methylmalonic acidemia. If nervous system damage is present and blood testing is inconclusive, a lumbar puncture may be carried out to measure cerebrospinal fluid B_{12} levels.

Serum haptocorrin binds 80-90% of circulating B_{12}, rendering it unavailable for cellular delivery by transcobalamin II. This is conjectured to be a circulating storage function. Several serious, even life-threatening diseases cause elevated serum haptocorrin, measured as abnormally high serum vitamin B_{12}, while potentially manifesting as a symptomatic vitamin deficiency because of insufficient vitamin bound to transcobalamin II which transfers the vitamin to cells.

== Medical uses ==
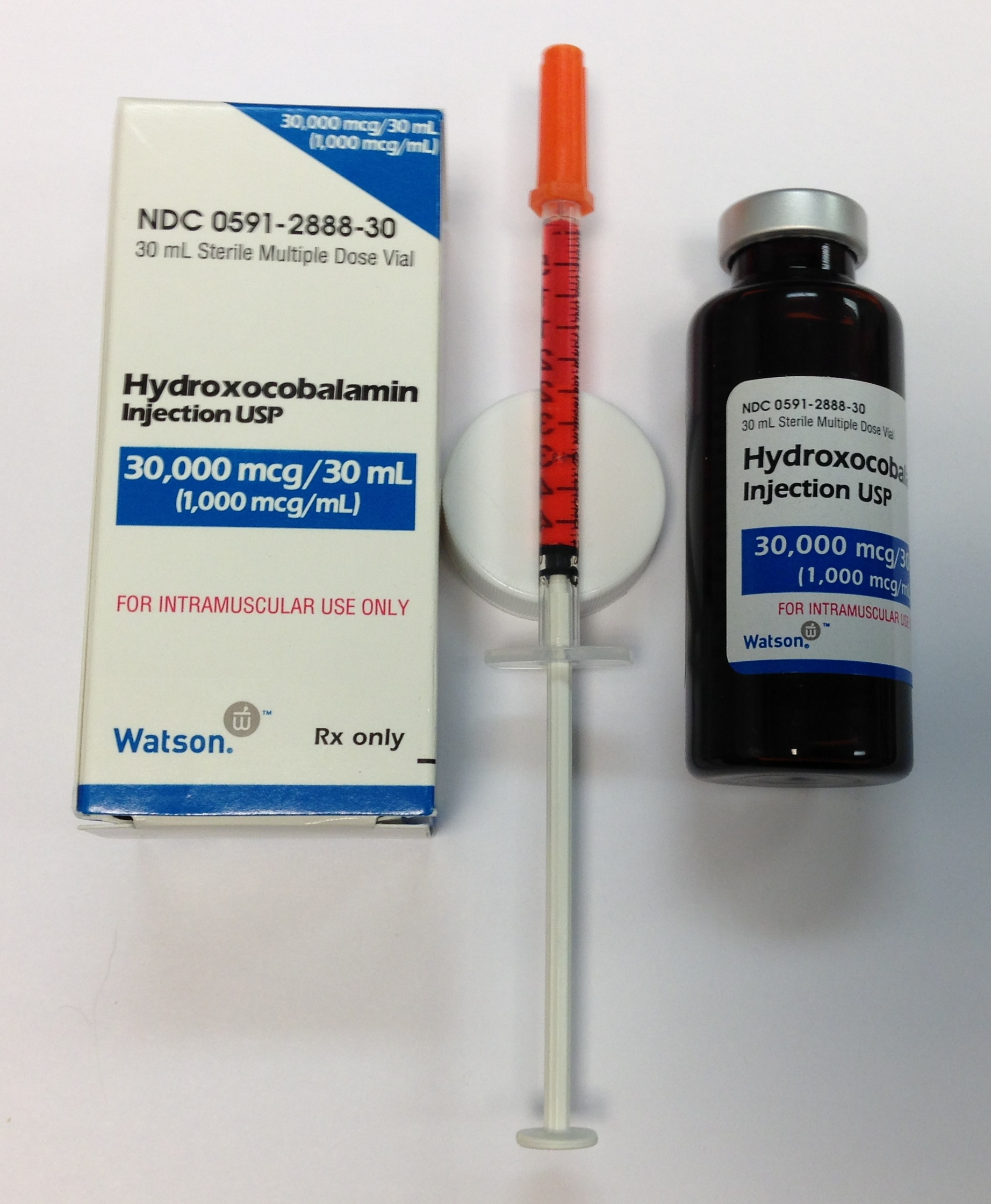
A vitamin B_{12} solution (hydroxocobalamin) in a multi-dose bottle, with a single dose drawn up into a syringe for injection. Preparations are usually bright red.

=== Treatment of deficiency ===
Severe vitamin B_{12} deficiency is initially corrected with daily intramuscular injections of 1000 μg of the vitamin, followed by maintenance via monthly injections of the same amount or daily oral dosing of 1000 μg. The oral daily dose far exceeds the vitamin requirement because the normal transporter protein-mediated absorption is absent, leaving only inefficient intestinal passive absorption. Injection side effects include skin rash, itching, chills, fever, hot flushes, nausea and dizziness. There are not enough studies on whether pills are as effective in improving or eliminating symptoms as parenteral treatment.

=== Cyanide poisoning ===
For cyanide poisoning, a large amount of hydroxocobalamin may be given intravenously and sometimes in combination with sodium thiosulfate. The mechanism of action is straightforward: the hydroxycobalamin hydroxide ligand is displaced by the toxic cyanide ion, and the resulting non-toxic cyanocobalamin is excreted in urine.

== Dietary recommendations ==
Some research shows that most people in the United States and the United Kingdom consume sufficient vitamin B_{12}. However, other research suggests that the proportion of people with low or marginal levels of vitamin B_{12} is up to 40% in the Western world. Grain-based foods can be fortified by having the vitamin added to them. Vitamin B_{12} supplements are available as single or multivitamin tablets. Pharmaceutical preparations of vitamin B_{12} may be given by intramuscular injection. Since there are few non-animal sources of the vitamin, vegans are advised to consume a dietary supplement or fortified foods for B_{12} intake, or risk serious health consequences. Children in some regions of developing countries are at particular risk due to increased requirements during growth coupled with diets low in animal-sourced foods.

The US National Academy of Medicine updated estimated average requirements (EARs) and recommended dietary allowances (RDAs) for vitamin B_{12} in 1998. The EAR for vitamin B_{12} for women and men ages 14 and up is 2.0 μg/day; the RDA is 2.4 μg/d. RDA is higher than EAR to identify amounts that will cover people with higher-than-average requirements. RDA for pregnancy equals 2.6 μg/day. RDA for lactation equals 2.8 μg/d. For infants up to 12 months, the adequate intake (AI) is 0.4–0.5 μg/day. (AIs are established when there is insufficient information to determine EARs and RDAs.) For children ages 1–13 years, the RDA increases with age from 0.9 to 1.8 μg/day. Because 10 to 30 percent of older people may be unable to effectively absorb vitamin B_{12} naturally occurring in foods, those older than 50 years should meet their RDA mainly by consuming foods fortified with vitamin B_{12} or a supplement containing vitamin B_{12}. As for safety, tolerable upper intake levels (known as ULs) are set for vitamins and minerals when evidence is sufficient. In the case of vitamin B_{12} there is no UL, as there is no human data for adverse effects from high doses. Collectively the EARs, RDAs, AIs, and ULs are referred to as dietary reference intakes (DRIs).

The European Food Safety Authority (EFSA) refers to the collective set of information as "dietary reference values", with population reference intake (PRI) instead of RDA, and average requirement instead of EAR. AI and UL are defined by EFSA the same as in the United States. For women and men over age 18, the adequate intake (AI) is set at 4.0 μg/day. AI for pregnancy is 4.5 μg/day, and for lactation 5.0 μg/day. For children aged 1–14 years, the AIs increase with age from 1.5 to 3.5 μg/day. These AIs are higher than the U.S. RDAs. The EFSA also reviewed the safety question and reached the same conclusion as in the United States—that there was not sufficient evidence to set a UL for vitamin B_{12}.

The Japan National Institute of Health and Nutrition set the RDA for people ages 12 and older at 2.4 μg/day. The World Health Organization also uses 2.4 μg/day as the adult recommended nutrient intake for this vitamin.

For U.S. food and dietary supplement labeling purposes, the amount in a serving is expressed as a "percent of daily value" (%DV). For vitamin B_{12} labeling purposes, 100% of the daily value was 6.0 μg, but on 27 May 2016, it was revised downward to 2.4 μg (see Reference Daily Intake). Compliance with the updated labeling regulations was required by 1 January 2020 for manufacturers with US$10 million or more in annual food sales, and by 1 January 2021 for manufacturers with lower volume food sales.

== Sources ==
=== Bacteria and archaea ===
Vitamin B_{12} is produced in nature by certain bacteria and archaea. It is synthesized by some bacteria in the gut microbiota in humans and other animals, but it has long been thought that humans cannot absorb this as it is made in the colon, downstream from the small intestine, where the absorption of most nutrients occurs. Ruminants, such as cows and sheep, are foregut fermenters, meaning that plant food undergoes microbial fermentation in the rumen before entering the true stomach (abomasum), thus allowing them to absorb the vitamin B_{12} produced by the bacteria.

Other mammalian species (examples: rabbits, pikas, beaver, guinea pigs) consume high-fiber plants which pass through the gastrointestinal tract and undergo bacterial fermentation in the cecum and large intestine. In this hindgut fermentation, the material from the cecum is expelled as "cecotropes" and are re-ingested, a practice referred to as cecotrophy. Re-ingestion allows for absorption of nutrients made available by bacterial fermentation, and also of vitamins and other nutrients synthesized by the gut bacteria, including vitamin B_{12}.

Non-ruminant, non-hindgut herbivores may have an enlarged forestomach and/or small intestine to provide a place for bacterial fermentation and B-vitamin production, including B_{12}. For gut bacteria to produce vitamin B_{12}, the animal must consume sufficient amounts of cobalt. Soil that is deficient in cobalt may result in B_{12} deficiency, and B_{12} injections or cobalt supplementation may be required for livestock.

=== Animal-derived foods ===
Animals store vitamin B_{12} from their diets in their livers and muscles and some pass the vitamin into their eggs and milk. Meat, liver, eggs, and milk are therefore sources of the vitamin for other animals, including humans. For humans, the bioavailability from eggs is less than 9%, compared to 40% to 60% from fish, fowl, and meat. Insects are a source of B_{12} for animals (including other insects and humans). Animal-derived food sources with a high concentration of vitamin B_{12} include liver and other organ meats from lamb, veal, beef, and turkey; also shellfish and crab meat.

In modern industrial agriculture, livestock diets are frequently supplemented with vitamin B_{12} or its precursor, cobalt. While ruminants can synthesize B_{12} via gut bacteria if soil cobalt levels are adequate, monogastric animals like swine and poultry require direct supplementation through fortified feed to maintain health and growth rates in intensive farming environments.

=== Plants and algae ===
There is some evidence that bacterial fermentation of plant foods and symbiotic relationships between algae and bacteria can provide vitamin B_{12}. However, the Academy of Nutrition and Dietetics considers plant and algae sources "unreliable", stating that vegans should turn to fortified foods and supplements instead.

Natural plant and algae sources of vitamin B_{12} include fermented plant foods such as tempeh and seaweed-derived foods such as nori and laverbread. Methylcobalamin has been identified in Chlorella vulgaris. Since only bacteria and some archea possess the genes and enzymes necessary to synthesize vitamin B_{12}, plant and algae sources all obtain the vitamin secondarily from symbiosis with various species of bacteria, or in the case of fermented plant foods, from bacterial fermentation.

=== Fortified foods ===
Foods for which vitamin B_{12}-fortified versions are available include breakfast cereals, plant-derived milk substitutes such as soy milk and oat milk, energy bars, and nutritional yeast. The fortification ingredient is cyanocobalamin. Microbial fermentation yields adenosylcobalamin, which is then converted to cyanocobalamin by the addition of potassium cyanide or thiocyanate in the presence of sodium nitrite and heat.

As of 2019, nineteen countries require food fortification of wheat flour, maize flour, or rice with vitamin B_{12}. Most of these are in southeast Africa or Central America.

Vegan advocacy organizations, among others, recommend that every vegan consume B_{12} from either fortified foods or supplements.

=== Supplements ===
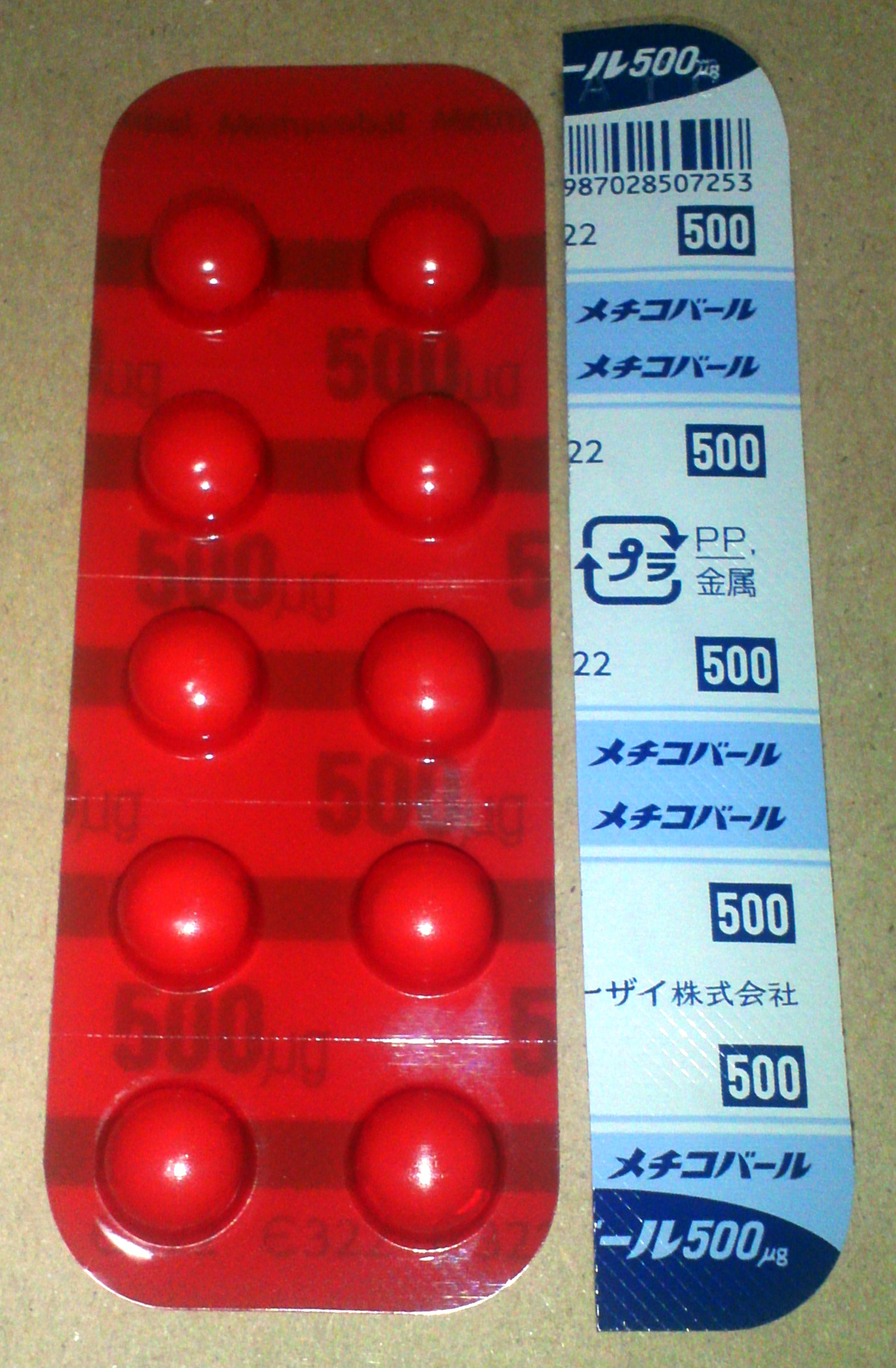
A blister pack of 500 μg methylcobalamin tablets

Vitamin B_{12} is included in multivitamin pills; in some countries grain-based foods, such as bread and pasta, are fortified with B_{12}. In the US, non-prescription products can be purchased providing up to 1,000 μg each, and it is a common ingredient in energy drinks and energy shots, usually at many times the recommended dietary allowance of B_{12}. The vitamin can also be supplied on prescription and delivered via injection or other means.

When used in supplementation, all of the vitamin B_{12} vitamers have been argued to be beneficial, with there not being clear evidence that any are relatively more or less effective. The amount of cyanide in cyanocobalamin is generally not considered a health risk, since even in a 1,000 μg dose, the 20 μg of cyanide it contains is less than the daily consumption of cyanide from food.

=== Intramuscular or intravenous injection ===
Injection of hydroxycobalamin is often used if digestive absorption is impaired, but this course of action may not be necessary with high-dose oral supplements (such as 0.5–1.0 mg or more), because with large quantities of the vitamin taken orally, even the 1% to 5% of free crystalline B_{12} that is absorbed along the entire intestine by passive diffusion may be sufficient to provide a necessary amount.

A person with cobalamin C disease, a rare autosomal, recessive, inheritance disease which results in combined methylmalonic aciduria and homocystinuria), can be treated with intravenous or intramuscular hydroxocobalamin.

=== Nanotechnologies used in vitamin B_{12} supplementation ===
Conventional administration does not ensure specific distribution and controlled release of vitamin B_{12}, for example to bone marrow and nerve cells. Nanocarrier strategies for improved vitamin B_{12} delivery remain embryonic as of 2021.

== Drug interactions ==
=== H_{2}-receptor antagonists and proton-pump inhibitors ===
Gastric acid is needed to release vitamin B_{12} from protein for absorption. Reduced secretion of gastric acid and pepsin, from the use of H_{2} blocker or proton-pump inhibitor (PPI) drugs, can reduce the absorption of protein-bound (dietary) vitamin B_{12}, although not of supplemental vitamin B_{12}. H_{2}-receptor antagonist examples include cimetidine, famotidine, nizatidine, and ranitidine. PPIs examples include omeprazole, lansoprazole, rabeprazole, pantoprazole, and esomeprazole. Clinically significant vitamin B_{12} deficiency and megaloblastic anemia are unlikely, unless these drug therapies are prolonged for two or more years, or if in addition, the person's dietary intake is below recommended levels. Symptomatic vitamin deficiency is more likely if the person is rendered achlorhydric (a complete absence of gastric acid secretion), which occurs more frequently with proton pump inhibitors than H_{2} blockers.

=== Metformin ===
Reduced serum levels of vitamin B_{12} occur in up to 30% of people taking long-term anti-diabetic metformin. Deficiency does not develop if dietary intake of vitamin B_{12} is adequate or prophylactic B_{12} supplementation is given. If the deficiency is detected, metformin can be continued while the deficiency is corrected with B_{12} supplements.

=== Other drugs ===
Certain medications can decrease the absorption of orally consumed vitamin B_{12}, including colchicine, extended-release potassium products, and antibiotics such as gentamicin, neomycin and tobramycin. Anti-seizure medications phenobarbital, pregabalin, primidone and topiramate are associated with lower than normal serum vitamin concentration. However, serum levels were higher in people prescribed valproate. In addition, certain drugs may interfere with laboratory tests for the vitamin, such as amoxicillin, erythromycin, methotrexate and pyrimethamine.

== Chemistry ==
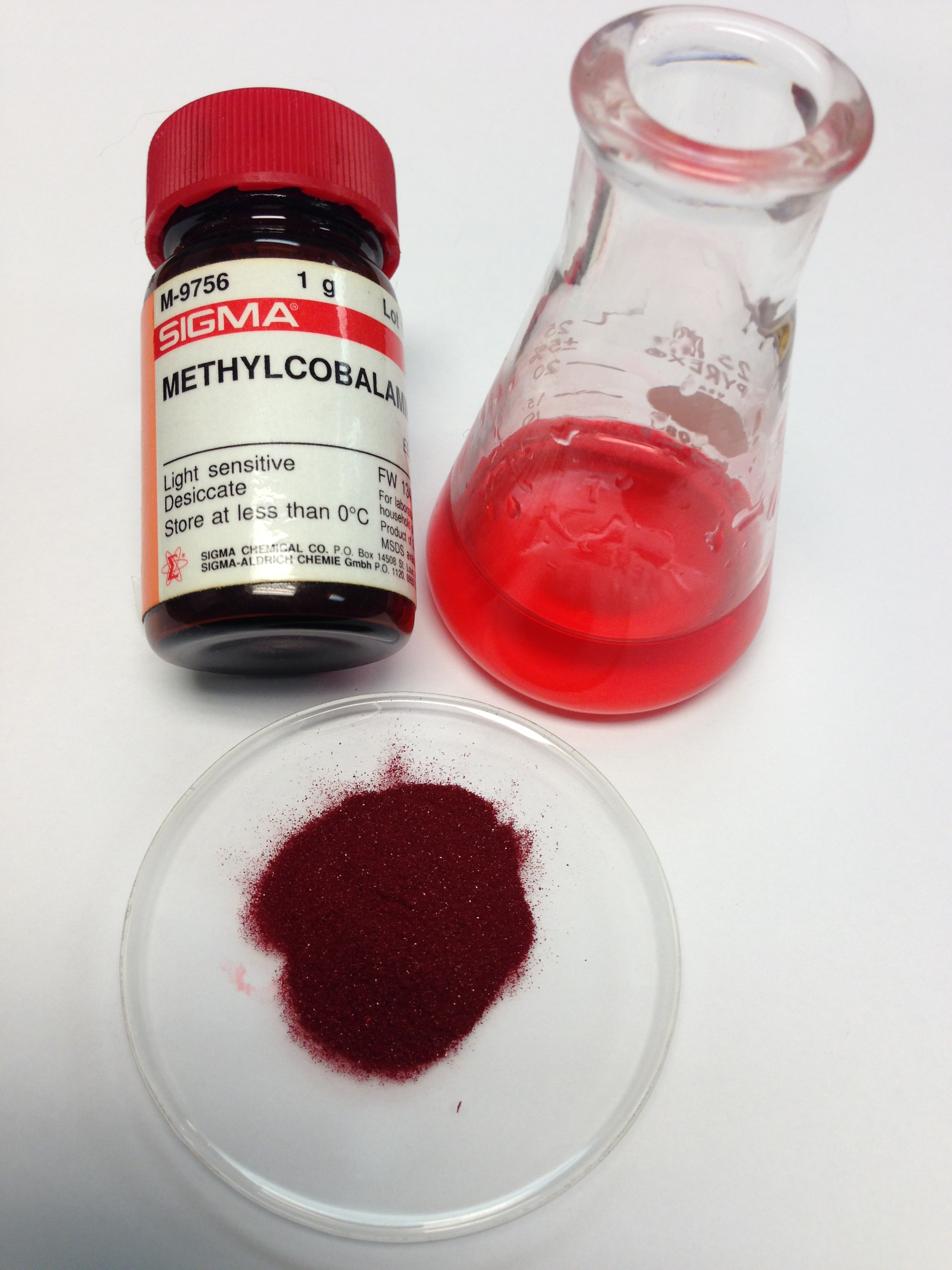
Methylcobalamin (shown) is a form of vitamin B_{12}. Physically it resembles the other forms of vitamin B_{12}, occurring as dark red crystals that freely form cherry-colored transparent solutions in water.

Vitamin B_{12} is the most chemically complex of all the vitamins. The structure of B_{12} is based on a corrin ring, which is similar to the porphyrin ring found in heme. The central metal ion is cobalt. As isolated as an air-stable solid and available commercially, cobalt in vitamin B_{12} (cyanocobalamin and other vitamers) is present in its +3 oxidation state. Biochemically, the cobalt center can take part in both two-electron and one-electron reductive processes to access the "reduced" (B_{12r}, +2 oxidation state) and "super-reduced" (B_{12s}, +1 oxidation state) forms. The ability to shuttle between the +1, +2, and +3 oxidation states is responsible for the versatile chemistry of vitamin B_{12}, allowing it to serve as a donor of deoxyadenosyl radical (radical alkyl source) and as a methyl cation equivalent (electrophilic alkyl source).

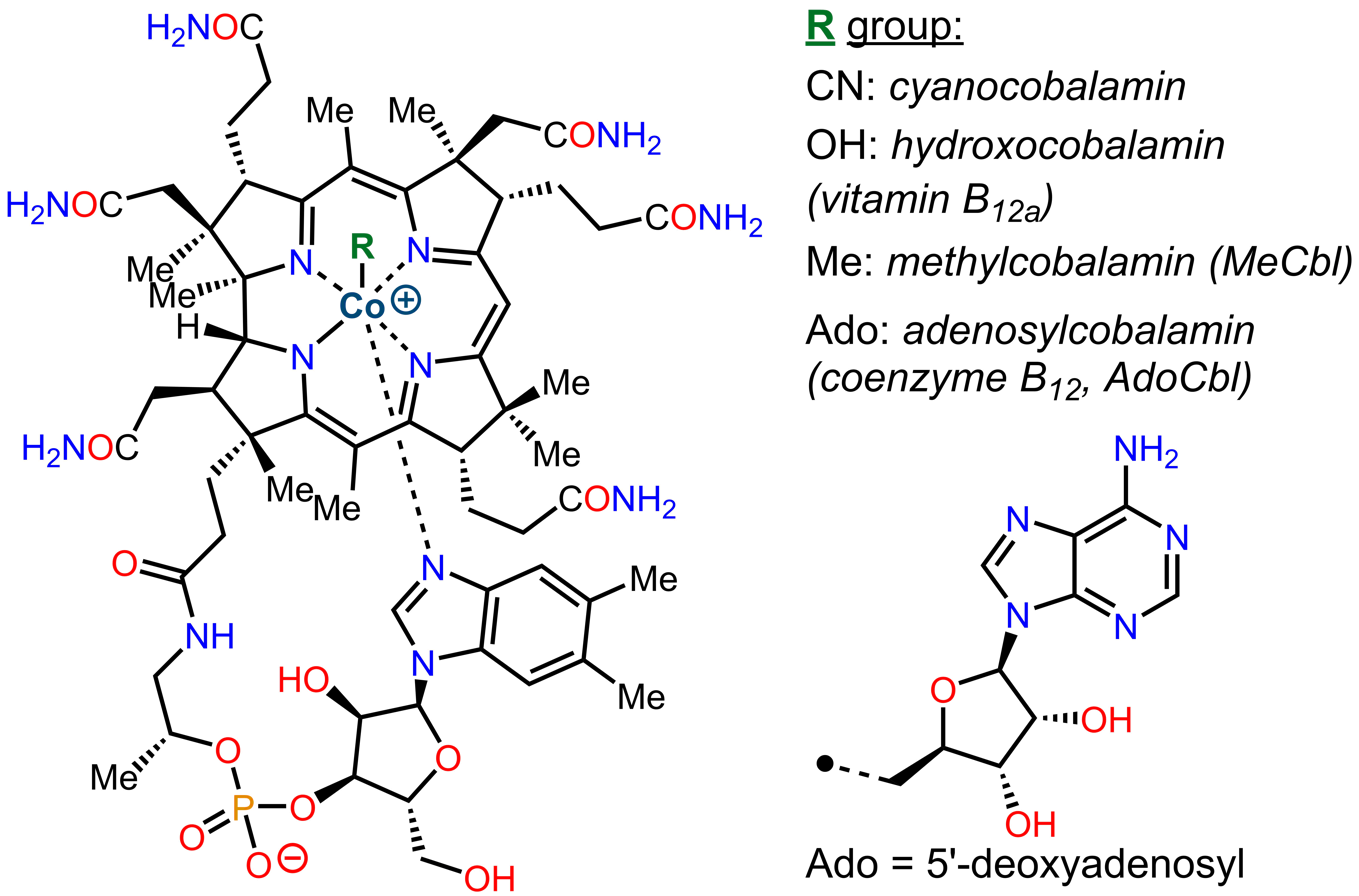
The structures of the four most common vitamers of cobalamin, together with some synonyms. The structure of the 5'-deoxyadenosyl group, which forms the R group of adenosylcobalamin is also shown.

Four of the six coordination sites are provided by the corrin ring and a fifth by a dimethylbenzimidazole group. The sixth coordination site, the reactive center, is variable, being a cyano group (–CN), a hydroxyl group (–OH), a methyl group (–CH_{3}) or a 5′-deoxyadenosyl group. Historically, the covalent carbon–cobalt bond is one of the first examples of carbon-metal bonds to be discovered in biology. The hydrogenases and, by necessity, enzymes associated with cobalt utilization, involve metal-carbon bonds. Animals can convert cyanocobalamin and hydroxocobalamin to the bioactive forms adenosylcobalamin and methylcobalamin by enzymatically replacing the cyano or hydroxyl groups.

=== Methods for the analysis of vitamin B_{12} in food ===
Several methods have been used to determine the vitamin B_{12} content in foods including microbiological assays, chemiluminescence assays, polarographic, spectrophotometric, and high-performance liquid chromatography processes. The microbiological assay has been the most commonly used assay technique for foods, utilizing certain vitamin B_{12}-requiring microorganisms, such as Lactobacillus delbrueckii subsp. lactis ATCC7830. However, it is no longer the reference method due to the high measurement uncertainty of vitamin B_{12}.

Furthermore, this assay requires overnight incubation and may give false results if any inactive vitamin B_{12} analogues are present in the foods. Currently, radioisotope dilution assay (RIDA) with labeled vitamin B_{12} and hog IF (pigs) have been used to determine vitamin B_{12} content in food. Previous reports have suggested that the RIDA method can detect higher concentrations of vitamin B_{12} in foods compared to the microbiological assay method.

== Biochemistry ==
=== Coenzyme function ===
Vitamin B_{12} functions as a coenzyme, meaning that its presence is required in some enzyme-catalyzed reactions. Listed here are the three classes of enzymes that sometimes require B_{12} to function (in animals):

1. Isomerases
  Rearrangements in which a hydrogen atom is directly transferred between two adjacent atoms with concomitant exchange of the second substituent, X, which may be a carbon atom with substituents, an oxygen atom of an alcohol, or an amine. These use the AdoB_{12} (adenosylcobalamin) form of the vitamin.
2. Methyltransferases
  Methyl (–CH_{3}) group transfers between two molecules. These use the MeB_{12} (methylcobalamin) form of the vitamin.
3. Dehalogenases
  Some species of anaerobic bacteria synthesize B_{12}-dependent dehalogenases, which have potential commercial applications for degrading chlorinated pollutants. The microorganisms may either be capable of de novo corrinoid biosynthesis or are dependent on exogenous vitamin B_{12}.

In humans, two major coenzyme B_{12}-dependent enzyme families corresponding to the first two reaction types, are known. These are typified by the following two enzymes:

==== Methylmalonyl-CoA mutase ====
Simplified schematic diagram of the propionate metabolic pathway. Methylmalonyl-CoA mutase requires the coenzyme adenosylcobalamin to convert L-methylmalonyl-CoA into succinyl-CoA. Otherwise, methylmalonic acid accumulates, making it a marker for vitamin B_{12} deficiency, among other things.

Methylmalonyl coenzyme A mutase (MUT) is an isomerase enzyme that uses the AdoB_{12} form and reaction type 1 to convert L-methylmalonyl-CoA to succinyl-CoA, an important step in the catabolic breakdown of some amino acids into succinyl-CoA, which then enters energy production via the citric acid cycle. This functionality is lost in vitamin B_{12} deficiency, and can be measured clinically as an increased serum methylmalonic acid (MMA) concentration. The MUT function is necessary for proper myelin synthesis. Based on animal research, it is thought that the increased methylmalonyl-CoA hydrolyzes to form methylmalonate (methylmalonic acid), a neurotoxic dicarboxylic acid, causing neurological deterioration.

==== Methionine synthase ====
Simplified schematic diagram of the folate methionine cycle. Methionine synthase transfers the methyl group to the vitamin and then transfers the methyl group to homocysteine, converting that to methionine.

Methionine synthase, coded by MTR gene, is a methyltransferase enzyme which uses the MeB_{12} and reaction type 2 to transfer a methyl group from 5-methyltetrahydrofolate to homocysteine, thereby generating tetrahydrofolate (THF) and methionine. This functionality is lost in vitamin B_{12} deficiency, resulting in an increased homocysteine level and the trapping of folate as 5-methyl-tetrahydrofolate, from which THF (the active form of folate) cannot be recovered. THF plays an important role in DNA synthesis, so reduced availability of THF results in ineffective production of cells with rapid turnover, in particular red blood cells, and also intestinal wall cells which are responsible for absorption. THF may be regenerated via MTR or may be obtained from fresh folate in the diet. Thus all of the DNA synthetic effects of B_{12} deficiency, including the megaloblastic anemia of pernicious anemia, resolve if sufficient dietary folate is present. Thus the best-known "function" of B_{12} (that which is involved with DNA synthesis, cell division, and anemia) is a facultative function that is mediated by B_{12}-conservation of an active form of folate which is needed for efficient DNA production. Other cobalamin-requiring methyltransferase enzymes are also known in bacteria, such as Me-H_{4}-MPT, coenzyme M methyltransferase.

== Physiology ==
=== Absorption ===
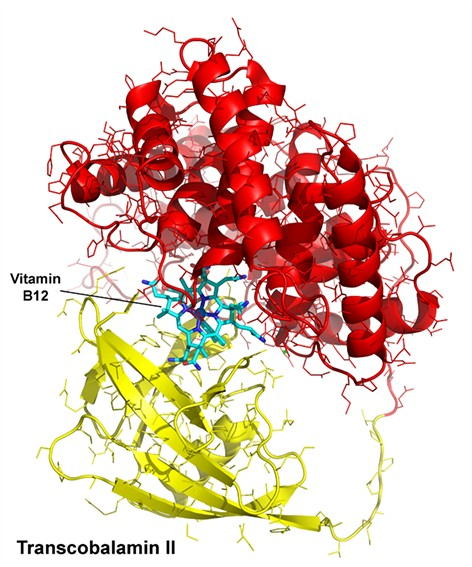
Structure of human TCII in complex with Vitamin B12. HC and IF show homologous protein folds.

Vitamin B_{12} is absorbed by a B_{12}-specific transport proteins or via passive diffusion. Transport-mediated absorption and tissue delivery is a complex process involving three transport proteins: haptocorrin (HC), intrinsic factor (IF) and transcobalamin II (TC2), and respective membrane receptor proteins (Figure).

HC is present in saliva. As vitamin-containing food is digested by hydrochloric acid and pepsin secreted into the stomach, HC binds the vitamin and protects it from acidic degradation. Upon leaving the stomach the hydrochloric acid of the chyme is neutralized in the duodenum by bicarbonate, and pancreatic proteases release the vitamin from HC, making it available to be bound by IF, which is a protein secreted by gastric parietal cells in response to the presence of food in the stomach. IF delivers the vitamin to receptor proteins cubilin and amnionless, which together form the cubam receptor in the distal ileum. The receptor is specific to the IF-B_{12} complex, and so will not bind to any vitamin content that is not bound to IF.

Investigations into the intestinal absorption of B_{12} confirm that the upper limit of absorption per single oral dose is about 1.5 μg, with 50% efficiency. In contrast, the passive diffusion process of B_{12} absorption — normally a small portion of total absorption of the vitamin from food consumption — may exceed the haptocorrin- and IF-mediated absorption when oral doses of B_{12} are large, with roughly 1% efficiency. Thus, dietary supplement B_{12} supplementation at 500 to 1000 μg per day allows pernicious anemia and certain other defects in B_{12} absorption to be treated with daily oral megadoses of B_{12} without any correction of the underlying absorption defects.

After the IF/B_{12} complex binds to cubam the complex is disassociated and the free vitamin is transported into the portal circulation. The vitamin is then transferred to TC2, which serves as the circulating plasma transporter, hereditary defects in the production of TC2 and its receptor may produce functional deficiencies in B_{12} and infantile megaloblastic anemia, and abnormal B_{12} related biochemistry, even in some cases with normal blood B_{12} levels. For the vitamin to serve inside cells, the TC2-B_{12} complex must bind to a cell receptor protein and be endocytosed. TC2 is degraded within a lysosome, and free B_{12} is released into the cytoplasm, where it is transformed into the bioactive coenzyme by cellular enzymes.

==== Malabsorption ====
Individuals with pernicious anemia do not have the ability to produce intrinsic factor. Individuals who lack intrinsic factor have no ability to absorb vitamin B_{12}. The lack of intrinsic factor is most commonly due to autoimmune gastritis, which causes an autoimmune attack on the parietal cells that create it in the stomach.

Antacid drugs that neutralize stomach acid, as well as acid-suppressing agents such as proton-pump inhibitors, can inhibit the absorption of vitamin B_{12} by preventing its release from food in the stomach. Other causes of B_{12} malabsorption include bariatric surgery, pancreatic insufficiency, obstructive jaundice, tropical sprue, celiac disease, inherited intrinsic factor deficiency, and radiation enteritis affecting the distal ileum. Age is also a contributing factor: elderly individuals are often achlorhydric due to reduced parietal cell function in the stomach, increasing their risk of vitamin B_{12} deficiency. The ability to absorb vitamin B_{12} declines with age, particularly in individuals over 60.

=== Storage and excretion ===
How fast B_{12} levels change depends on the balance between how much B_{12} is obtained from the diet, how much is secreted and how much is absorbed. The total amount of vitamin B_{12} stored in the body is about 2–5 mg in adults. Around 50% of this is stored in the liver. Approximately 0.1% of this is lost per day by secretions into the gut, as not all these secretions are reabsorbed. Bile is the main form of B_{12} excretion; most of the B_{12} secreted in the bile is recycled via enterohepatic circulation. Excess B_{12} beyond the blood's binding capacity is typically excreted in urine. Owing to the extremely efficient enterohepatic circulation of B_{12}, the liver can store 3 to 5 years' worth of vitamin B_{12}; therefore, nutritional deficiency of this vitamin is rare in adults in the absence of malabsorption disorders. In the absence of intrinsic factor or distal ileum receptors, only months to a year of vitamin B_{12} are stored.

=== Cellular reprogramming ===
Vitamin B_{12} through its involvement in one-carbon metabolism is a limiting factor in cellular reprogramming and tissue regeneration and epigenetic regulation. Cellular reprogramming is the process by which somatic cells can be converted to a pluripotent state. Vitamin B_{12} levels affect the histone modification H3K36me3, which suppresses illegitimate transcription outside of gene promoters. Mice undergoing in vivo reprogramming were found to become depleted in B_{12} and show signs of methionine starvation while supplementing reprogramming mice and cells with B_{12} increased reprogramming efficiency, indicating a cell-intrinsic effect.

== Synthesis ==
=== Biosynthesis ===
Vitamin B_{12} is derived from a tetrapyrrolic structural framework created by the enzymes deaminase and cosynthetase which transform aminolevulinic acid via porphobilinogen and hydroxymethylbilane to uroporphyrinogen III. The latter is the first macrocyclic intermediate common to heme, chlorophyll, siroheme and B_{12} itself. Later steps, especially the incorporation of the additional methyl groups of its structure, were investigated using ^{13}C methyl-labeled S-adenosyl methionine. It was not until a genetically engineered strain of Pseudomonas denitrificans was used, in which eight of the genes involved in the biosynthesis of the vitamin had been overexpressed, that the complete sequence of methylation and other steps could be determined, thus fully establishing all the intermediates in the pathway.

Species from the following genera and the following individual species are known to synthesize B_{12}: Propionibacterium shermanii, Pseudomonas denitrificans, Streptomyces griseus, Acetobacterium, Aerobacter, Agrobacterium, Alcaligenes, Azotobacter, Bacillus, Clostridium, Corynebacterium, Flavobacterium, Lactobacillus, Micromonospora, Mycobacterium, Nocardia, Proteus, Rhizobium, Salmonella, Serratia, Streptococcus and Xanthomonas.

=== Industrial ===
Industrial production of B_{12} is achieved through fermentation of selected microorganisms. Streptomyces griseus, a bacterium once thought to be a fungus, was the commercial source of vitamin B_{12} for many years. The species Pseudomonas denitrificans and Propionibacterium freudenreichii subsp. shermanii are more commonly used today. These are grown under special conditions to enhance yield. Rhone-Poulenc improved yield via genetic engineering P. denitrificans. Propionibacterium, the other commonly used bacteria, produce no exotoxins or endotoxins and are generally recognized as safe (have been granted GRAS status) by the Food and Drug Administration of the United States.

The total world production of vitamin B_{12} in 2008 was 35,000 kg (77,000 lb).

=== Laboratory ===
The complete laboratory synthesis of B_{12} was achieved by Robert Burns Woodward and Albert Eschenmoser in 1972. The work required the effort of 91 postdoctoral fellows (mostly at Harvard) and 12 PhD students (at ETH Zurich) from 19 nations. The synthesis constitutes a formal total synthesis, since the research groups only prepared the known intermediate cobyric acid, whose chemical conversion to vitamin B_{12} was previously reported. This synthesis of vitamin B_{12} is of no practical consequence due to its length, taking 72 chemical steps and giving an overall chemical yield well under 0.01%. Although there have been sporadic synthetic efforts since 1972, the Eschenmoser–Woodward synthesis remains the only completed (formal) total synthesis.

== History ==
=== Descriptions of deficiency effects ===
Between 1849 and 1887, Thomas Addison described a case of pernicious anemia, William Osler and William Gardner first described a case of neuropathy, Hayem described large red cells in the peripheral blood in this condition, which he called "giant blood corpuscles" (now called macrocytes), Paul Ehrlich identified megaloblasts in the bone marrow, and Ludwig Lichtheim described a case of myelopathy.

=== Identification of liver as an anti-anemia food ===
During the 1920s, George Whipple discovered that ingesting large amounts of raw liver seemed to most rapidly cure the anemia of blood loss in dogs, and hypothesized that eating liver might treat pernicious anemia. Edwin Cohn prepared a liver extract that was 50 to 100 times more potent in treating pernicious anemia than the natural liver products. William Castle demonstrated that gastric juice contained an "intrinsic factor" which when combined with meat ingestion resulted in absorption of the vitamin in this condition. In 1934, George Whipple shared the 1934 Nobel Prize in Physiology or Medicine with William P. Murphy and George Minot for discovery of an effective treatment for pernicious anemia using liver concentrate, later found to contain a large amount of vitamin B_{12}.

=== Identification of the active compound ===
While working at the Bureau of Dairy Industry, U.S. Department of Agriculture, Mary Shaw Shorb was assigned work on the bacterial strain Lactobacillus lactis Dorner (LLD), which was used to make yogurt and other cultured dairy products. The culture medium for LLD required liver extract. Shorb knew that the same liver extract was used to treat pernicious anemia (her father-in-law had died from the disease), and concluded that LLD could be developed as an assay method to identify the active compound. While at the University of Maryland, she received a small grant from Merck, and in collaboration with Karl Folkers from that company, developed the LLD assay. This identified "LLD factor" as essential for the bacteria's growth. Shorb, Folker and Alexander R. Todd, at the University of Cambridge, used the LLD assay to extract the anti-pernicious anemia factor from liver extracts, purify it, and name it vitamin B_{12}. In 1955, Todd helped elucidate the structure of the vitamin. The complete chemical structure of the molecule was determined by Dorothy Hodgkin based on crystallographic data and published in 1955 and 1956, for which, and for other crystallographic analyses, she was awarded the Nobel Prize in Chemistry in 1964. Hodgkin went on to decipher the structure of insulin.

George Whipple, George Minot and William Murphy were awarded the Nobel Prize in 1934 for their work on the vitamin. Three other Nobel laureates, Alexander R. Todd (1957), Dorothy Hodgkin (1964) and Robert Burns Woodward (1965) made important contributions to its study.

Nobel laureates for discoveries relating to vitamin B_{12}
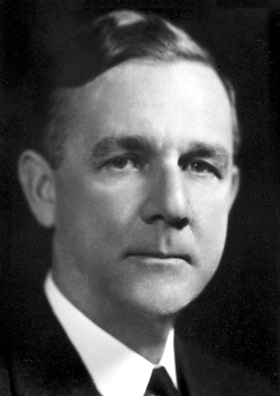
George Whipple

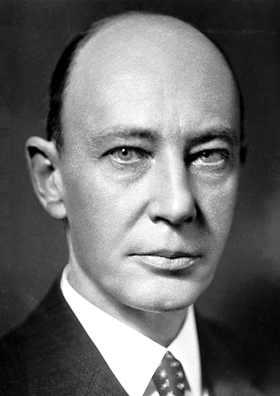
George Minot

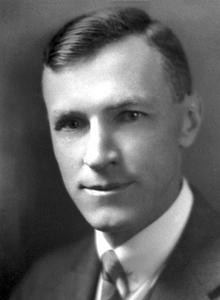
William P. Murphy

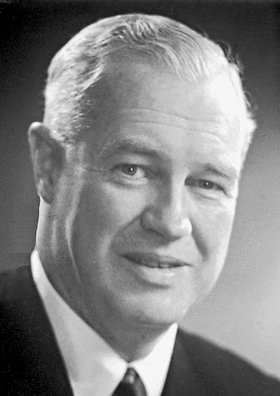
Alexander R. Todd

Dorothy Hodgkin

Robert Burns Woodward

=== Commercial production ===
Industrial production of vitamin B_{12} is achieved through fermentation of selected microorganisms. As noted above, the completely synthetic laboratory synthesis of B_{12} was achieved by Robert Burns Woodward and Albert Eschenmoser in 1972, though this process has no commercial potential, requiring more than 70 steps and having a yield well below 0.01%.

== Society and culture ==
In the 1970s, John A. Myers, a physician residing in Baltimore, developed a program of injecting vitamins and minerals intravenously for various medical conditions. The formula included 1000 μg of cyanocobalamin. This came to be known as the Myers' cocktail. After he died in 1984, other physicians and naturopaths took up prescribing "intravenous micronutrient therapy" with unsubstantiated health claims for treating fatigue, low energy, stress, anxiety, migraine, depression, immunocompromised, promoting weight loss, and more. However, other than a report on case studies there are no benefits confirmed in the scientific literature. Healthcare practitioners at clinics and spas prescribe versions of these intravenous combination products, but also intramuscular injections of just vitamin B_{12}. A Mayo Clinic review concluded that there is no solid evidence that vitamin B_{12} injections provide an energy boost or aid weight loss.

There is evidence that for elderly people, physicians often repeatedly prescribe and administer cyanocobalamin injections inappropriately, evidenced by the majority of subjects in one large study either having had normal serum concentrations or having not been tested before the injections.

== See also ==
- Adenosylcobalamin
- Cobalamin biosynthesis
- Cyanocobalamin
- Hydroxocobalamin
- Methylcobalamin
- Vitamins
