= Reactive center =

A reactive center, also called a propagating center, in chemistry is a particular location, usually an atom, within a chemical compound that is the likely center of a reaction in which the chemical is involved. In chain-growth polymer chemistry, this is also the point of propagation for a growing chain. The reactive center is commonly radical, anionic, or cationic, but can also take other forms.
