= Haptocorrin =

Protein-coding gene in the species Homo sapiens

TCN1
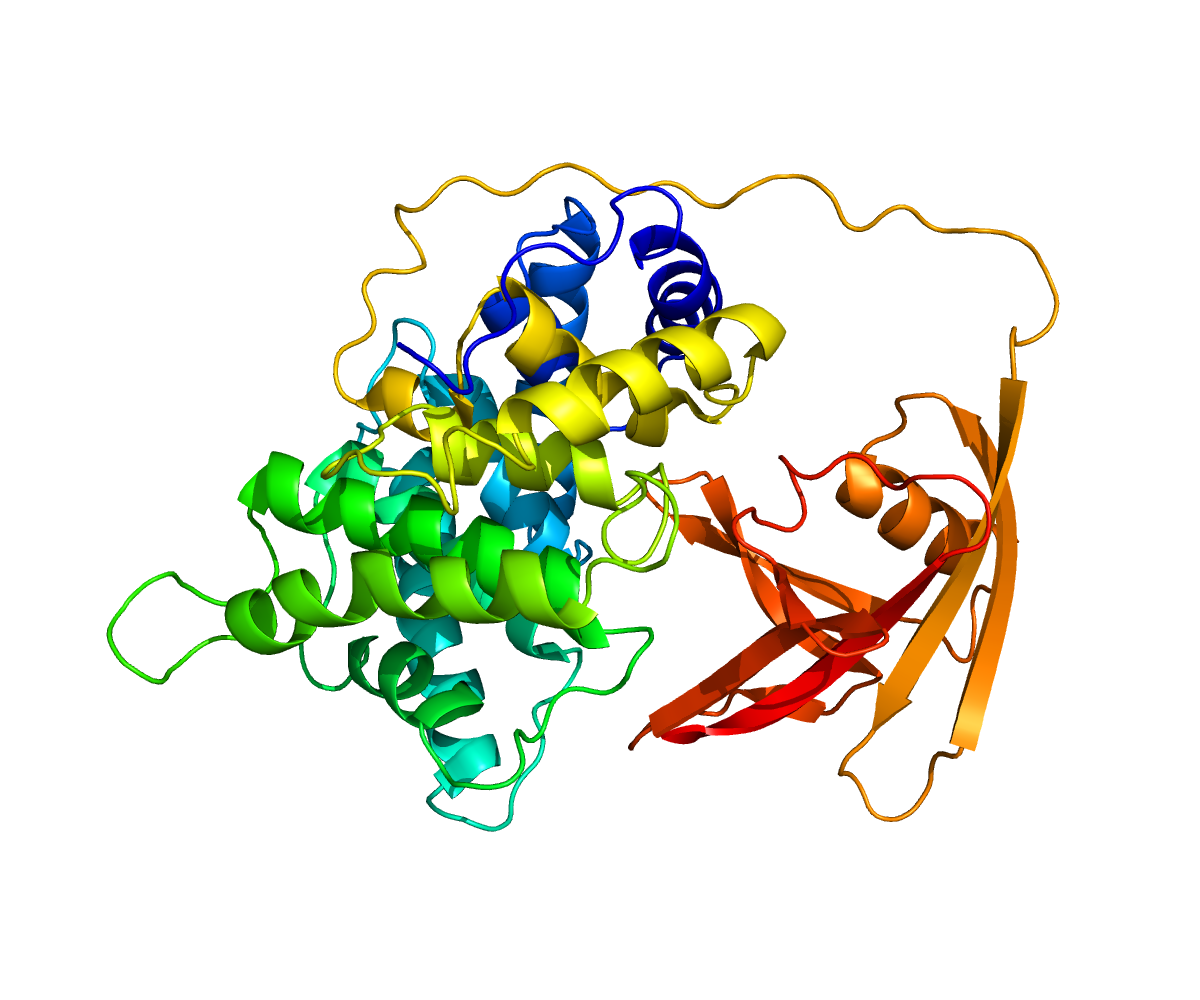

Identifiers
- Aliases: TCN1
- External IDs: OMIM: 189905; GeneCards: TCN1
Available structures
PDB	Human UniProt search: PDBe RCSB
PDB	List of PDB id codes 4KKI, 4KKJ

Gene location (Human)
Chr.	Chromosome 11 (human)
Band	11q12.1	Start	59,852,800 bp
Band	11q12.1	End	59,866,489 bp
RNA expression pattern
Bgee	Human / Mouse (ortholog); Top expressed in: pancreatic ductal cell; olfactory zone of nasal mucosa; trachea; parotid gland; gallbladder; bone marrow; bone marrow cell; nasal epithelium; trabecular bone; testicle / n/a; More reference expression data
BioGPS	n/a
Gene ontology
Molecular function	cobalamin binding
Cellular component	extracellular region; extracellular space; specific granule lumen; tertiary granule lumen
Biological process	cobalamin metabolic process; cobalt ion transport; ion transport; cobalamin transport; neutrophil degranulation; transport
Sources:Amigo / QuickGO
Orthologs
Databases	NCBI: entry; OMA: entry
Species	Human	Mouse
Entrez	6947	n/a
Ensembl	ENSG00000134827	n/a
UniProt	P20061	n/a
RefSeq (mRNA)	NM_001062	n/a
RefSeq (protein)	NP_001053	n/a
Location (UCSC)	Chr 11: 59.85 – 59.87 Mb	n/a
PubMed search		n/a
- Wikidata
View/Edit Human

Haptocorrin (HC) is a protein that in humans is encoded by the TCN1 gene. Haptocorrin (also known as transcobalamin-1 (TC-1), or cobalophilin) is a glycoprotein that binds to vitamin B_{12} and protects it from the gastric acid of the stomach. It is also present in the blood where it binds most circulating vitamin B_{12}, rendering it unavailable for uptake by cells (this is conjectured to be a circulating storage function).

== Function ==
=== Digestive ===
HC is produced by the salivary glands of the oral cavity in response to ingestion of food. Vitamin B_{12} is highly structural susceptible to denaturation by the acidic environment of the stomach. Haptocorrin has a high affinity for the molecular structure of vitamin B_{12} forming a haptocorrin–B_{12} complex that is impervious to stomach acid, enabling it to reach the more alkaline duodenum intact. In the duodenum, pancreatic proteases (a component of pancreatic juice) cleave haptocorrin, releasing vitamin B_{12}. Intrinsic factor (IF) that is secreted by parietal cells of the stomach now binds B_{12} released from haptocorrin to subsequently enable cubilin receptors of the ileum to take up B_{12}–IF complexes by endocytosis-mediated absorption before B_{12} is finally released into circulation. Without IF, only 1% of vitamin B_{12} is ultimately absorbed.

=== Serum ===
HC is present in blood serum where it binds 80-90% of circulating B_{12}, rendering it unavailable for cellular uptake by transcobalamin II. This is conjectured to be a circulating storage function.

Several serious, even life-threatening diseases cause elevated serum HC, measured as abnormally high serum vitamin B_{12} while at the same time manifesting as a vitamin deficiency because of insufficient vitamin bound to transcobalamin II.
