= Ludwig Lichtheim =

German physician (1845–1928)

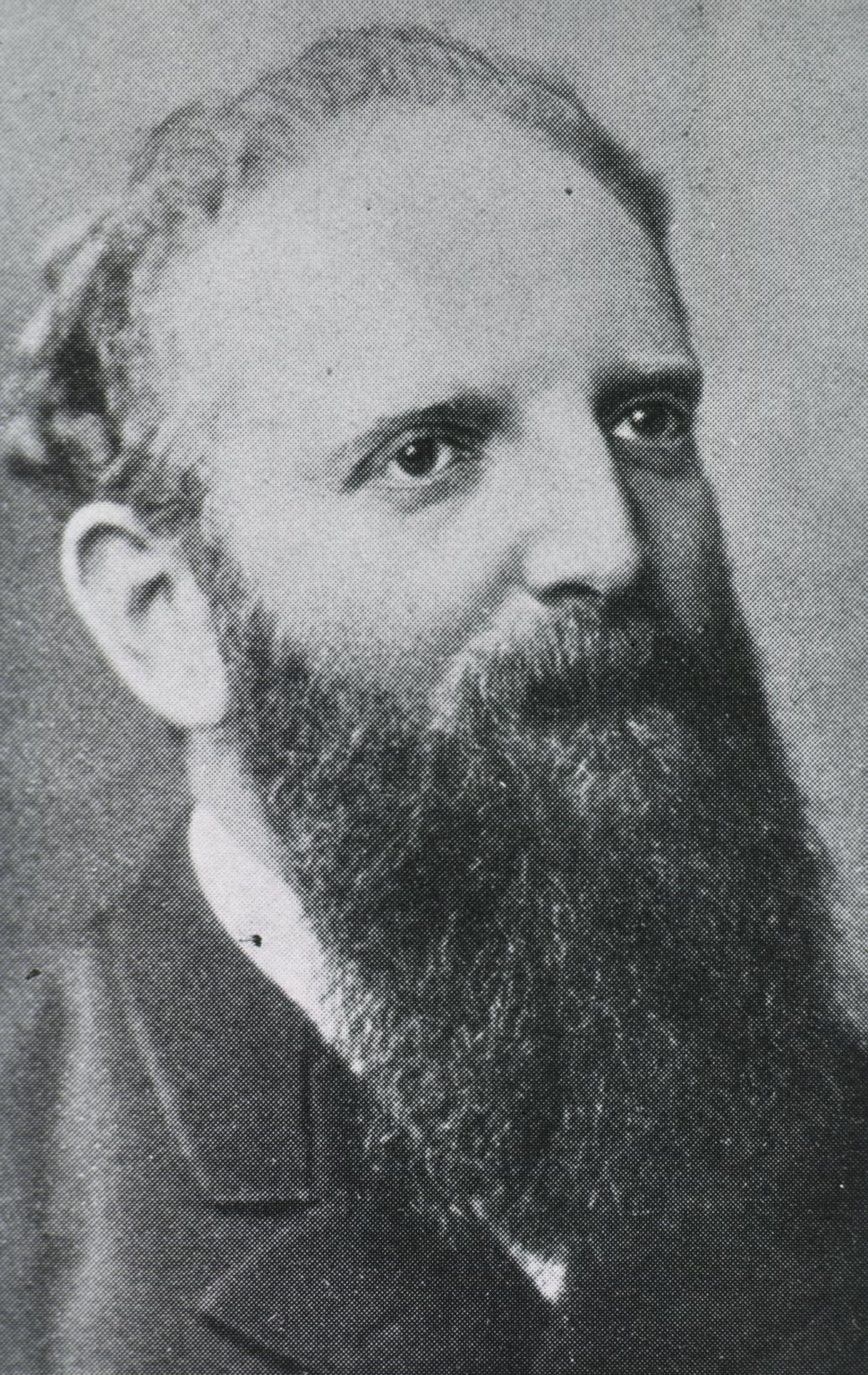
Ludwig Lichtheim.

Ludwig Lichtheim (7 December 1845 in Breslau – 13 January 1928) was a German physician of Jewish descent.

== Biography ==
He was educated at the gymnasium in Breslau, and studied medicine at the universities of Berlin, Zurich, and Breslau, graduating in 1868. From 1869 to 1872 he was assistant in the medical hospital at Breslau under Hermann Lebert; from 1872 to 1873 in the surgical hospital at Halle under Richard von Volkmann; and from 1873 to 1877 again at Breslau in the medical polyclinic, under Lebert and Michael Anton Biermer.

He became privat-docent at Breslau University in 1876; an assistant professor at the University of Jena in 1877; and was called in 1888 to the University of Königsberg as a professor of medicine, his final position. In 1891, with Adolph Strümpell, Wilhelm Heinrich Erb and Friedrich Schultze (1848-1934), he founded the journal "Deutsche Zeitschrift für Nervenheilkunde".

He was an expert on aphasia and developed an explanation of language processing in the brain, which was used as part of medical school training in neurology. Furthermore, he developed an early model about the functional principle of the (human) brain, the so-called Wernicke-Lichtheim Model.

== Associated eponym ==
- "Lichtheim's sign": A phenomenon seen in transcortical motor aphasia. The patient can indicate through the use of his/her fingers the number of syllables of a word he has in mind but is unable to speak.

== Publications ==
Lichtheim wrote many essays in the medical journals, among which may be mentioned:

- "Ueber Behandlung Pleuritischer Exsudate," in "Sammlung Klinischer Vorträge," 1872; (with Julius Friedrich Cohnheim)
- "Ueber Hydrämie und Hydrämisches Oedem," in Virchow's "Archiv," lxix.;
- "Ueber Periodische Haemoglobinurie," in "Sammlung Klinischer Vorträge," 1878;
- "Die Antipyretische Wirkung des Phenols," in "Breslauer Aerztliche Zeitschrift," 1881;
- "Ueber Tuberkulose," in "Rapport des Kongresses für Innere Medizin," 1883;
- "Die Chronischen Herzmuskelerkrankungen und Ihre Behandlung," ib. 1888;
- "Zur Diagnose der Meningitis," in "Berliner Klinische Wochenschrift," 1895.

He was the author also of "Die Störungen des Lungenkreislaufs, und Ihr Einfluss auf den Blutdruck" (Berlin, 1876).

== See also ==
- Subacute combined degeneration of spinal cord
