= Transcobalamin =

Group of carrier proteins which bind with vitamin B12 in the blood

TCN2

Identifiers
- Aliases: TCN2, D22S676, D22S750, II, TC, TC II, TC-2, TC2, TCII, transcobalamin 2
- External IDs: OMIM: 613441; MGI: 98534; GeneCards: TCN2
Available structures
| PDB | Ortholog search: PDBe RCSB |
| PDB | List of PDB id codes 2BB5, 4ZRQ |

Gene location (Human)
| Chr. | Chromosome 22 (human) |
| Band | 22q12.2 | Start | 30,607,003 bp |
| Band | 22q12.2 | End | 30,627,271 bp |

Gene location (Mouse)
| Chr. | Chromosome 11 (mouse) |
| Band | 11 A1|11 2.76 cM | Start | 3,867,192 bp |
| Band | 11 A1|11 2.76 cM | End | 3,882,159 bp |
RNA expression pattern
| Bgee | Human / Mouse (ortholog); Top expressed in: gallbladder; right lung; upper lobe of left lung; human kidney; olfactory zone of nasal mucosa; right adrenal cortex; mucosa of ileum; left adrenal gland; left uterine tube; left adrenal cortex / Top expressed in: parotid gland; vestibular membrane of cochlear duct; right kidney; submandibular gland; human kidney; Epithelium of choroid plexus; lacrimal gland; proximal tubule; stroma of bone marrow; choroid plexus of fourth ventricle; More reference expression data |
| BioGPS | n/a |
Gene ontology
| Molecular function | metal ion binding; cobalamin binding; protein binding |
| Cellular component | extracellular region; endosome; lysosomal lumen; extracellular space |
| Biological process | cobalamin metabolic process; cobalt ion transport; ion transport; cobalamin transport |
Sources:Amigo / QuickGO
Orthologs
| Databases | NCBI: entry; OMA: entry |
| Species | Human | Mouse |
| Entrez | 6948 | 21452 |
| Ensembl | ENSG00000185339 | ENSMUSG00000020432 |
| UniProt | P20062 | O88968 |
| RefSeq (mRNA) | NM_001190420; NM_000355; NM_001184726 | NM_001130458; NM_001130459; NM_015749 |
| RefSeq (protein) | NP_000346; NP_001171655 | NP_001123930; NP_001123931; NP_056564 |
| Location (UCSC) | Chr 22: 30.61 – 30.63 Mb | Chr 11: 3.87 – 3.88 Mb |
| PubMed search |
- Wikidata
| View/Edit Human | View/Edit Mouse |

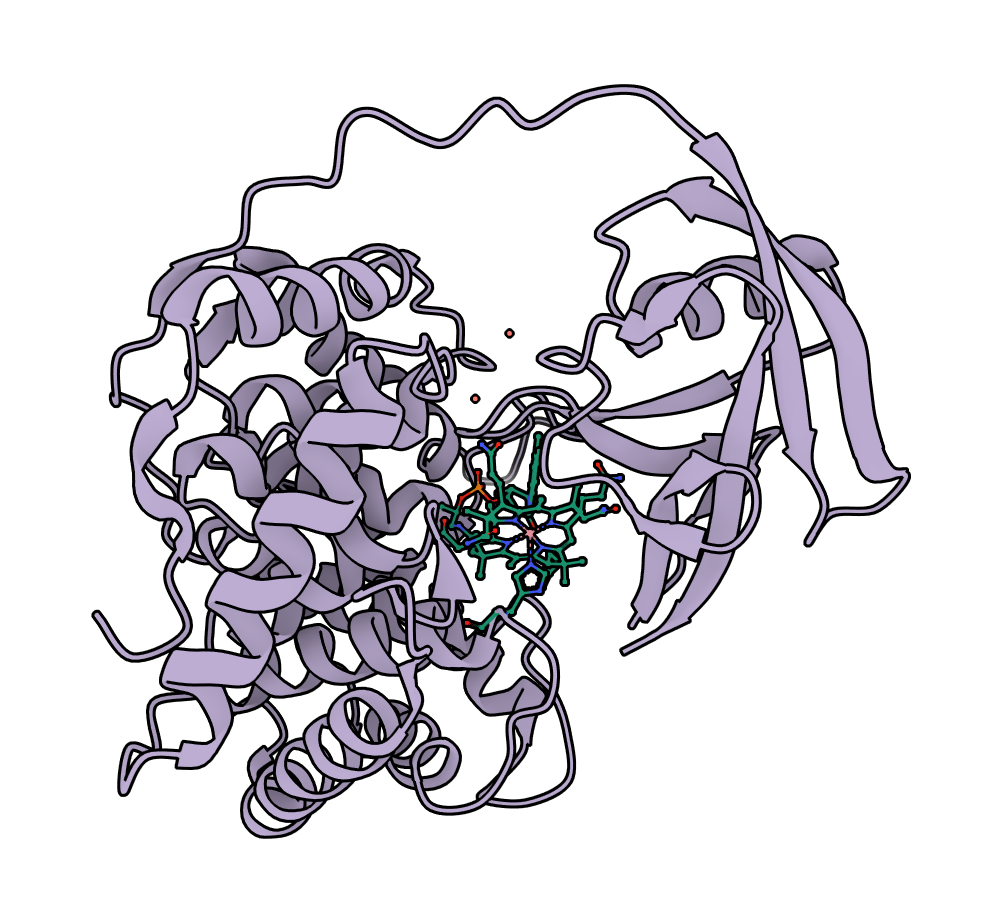
The complex of transcobalamin (transcobalamin II) with cobalamin (vitamin B_{12}). This is holotranscobalamin or "active B_{12}"

Transcobalamin is a protein that in humans is encoded by the gene TCN2. Transcobalamin (also known as transcobalamin II or TCII, see Nomenclature) binds Vitamin B_{12} (cobalamin), which enables uptake of B_{12} from the gastrointestinal tract, transport of cobalamin in the blood, and uptake by tissues.

The complex of transcobalamin bound to B_{12} is called holotranscobalamin or "active B12". This is the fraction of B_{12} in the blood that is able to be taken up by cells and used for cell functioning.

== Structure and function ==
Transcobalamin is a nonglycoprotein secretory protein of molecular mass 43 kDa. It is encoded in the human by the TCN2 gene. transcobalamin binds cobalamin once it has been taken up by enterocytes of the terminal ileum and the intrinsic factor–cobalamin complex has been degraded. It is then involved with the transport of cobalamin to the tissues, where it binds to its plasma membrane receptor (TC-2R), a heavily glycosylated protein with a monomeric molecular mass of 62 kDa, and releases cobalamin to the cells.

== Clinical significance ==
Holotranscobalamin (the name for the transcobalamin–cobalamin complex) is the active form of B_{12}. In the blood, approximately 80% of B_{12} is bound by haptocorrin and unavailable for uptake by cells, while the remainder is the transcobalamin-bound active form.

Modern laboratory techniques can selectively test for the levels of "active B_{12}" or "total B_{12}" (both the haptocorrin-bound and transcobalamin-bound forms) depending on which is more appropriate given the patient's situation, cost and availibility (e.g. active B_{12} is used in pregnancy because a fall in total B_{12} is expected in pregnancy). As of 2026, testing for active B_{12} is more expensive than testing for total B_{12}.

== Nomenclature ==
The term "transcobalamin" has traditionally encompassed two proteins: transcobalamin I (now more commonly referred to as haptocorrin) and transcobalamin II (now more commonly known simply as transcobalamin). Both are proteins that bind vitamin B_{12}, serving different purposes.

More recent publications tend to use the terms "haptocorrin" to refer to transcobalamin I and "transcobalamin" to refer to transcobalamin II. Older publications tend to use this "transcobalamin I" and "transcobalamin II" terminology, and the Uniprot uses this terminology. Some modern publications continue to use the older terminology _{.}
