= Intrinsic factor =

Glycoprotein produced in the stomach which binds to vitamin B12

CBLIF
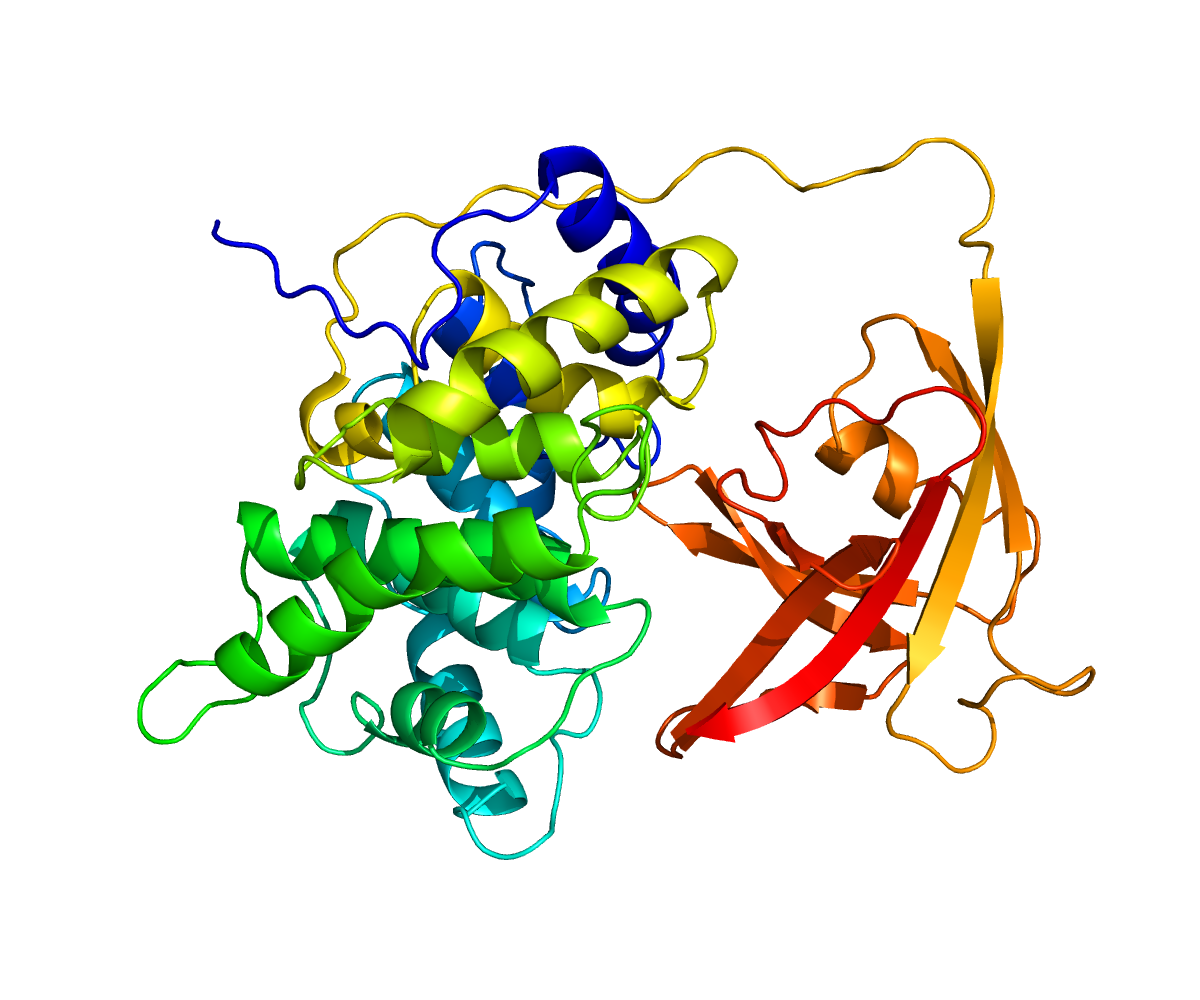

Identifiers
- Aliases: CBLIF, IF, IFMH, INF, TCN3, gastric intrinsic factor, intrinsic factor, Intrinsic factor , IF, cobalamin binding intrinsic factor, GIF
- External IDs: OMIM: 609342; MGI: 1202394; GeneCards: CBLIF
Available structures
PDB	Ortholog search: PDBe RCSB
PDB	List of PDB id codes 2PMV, 3KQ4

Gene location (Human)
Chr.	Chromosome 11 (human)
Band	11q12.1	Start	59,829,273 bp
Band	11q12.1	End	59,845,499 bp

Gene location (Mouse)
Chr.	Chromosome 19 (mouse)
Band	19|19 A	Start	11,724,918 bp
Band	19|19 A	End	11,740,811 bp
RNA expression pattern
Bgee	Human / Mouse (ortholog); Top expressed in: cardia; pylorus; body of stomach; testicle; fundus; buccal mucosa cell; gonad; pancreatic ductal cell; right lung; canal of the cervix / Top expressed in: epithelium of stomach; pyloric antrum; mucous cell of stomach; left lung lobe; embryo; primary oocyte; quadriceps femoris muscle; superior colliculus; duodenum; esophagus; More reference expression data
BioGPS	n/a
Gene ontology
Molecular function	cobalamin binding
Cellular component	extracellular region; microvillus; endosome; lysosomal lumen; apical plasma membrane; extracellular space
Biological process	cobalt ion transport; ion transport; cobalamin transport; cobalamin metabolic process
Sources:Amigo / QuickGO
Orthologs
Databases	NCBI: entry; OMA: entry
Species	Human	Mouse
Entrez	2694	14603
Ensembl	ENSG00000134812	ENSMUSG00000024682
UniProt	P27352	P52787
RefSeq (mRNA)	NM_005142	NM_008118
RefSeq (protein)	NP_005133	NP_032144
Location (UCSC)	Chr 11: 59.83 – 59.85 Mb	Chr 19: 11.72 – 11.74 Mb
PubMed search
- Wikidata
View/Edit Human	View/Edit Mouse

Intrinsic factor (IF), also known as cobalamin binding intrinsic factor, or gastric intrinsic factor (GIF), is a glycoprotein produced by specialized cells of the stomach, either by parietal cells (in humans) or chief cells (in rodents). It is necessary for the absorption of vitamin B_{12} later on in the distal ileum of the small intestine. In humans, the gastric intrinsic factor protein is encoded by the CBLIF gene. Haptocorrin (transcobalamin I) is another glycoprotein secreted by the salivary glands which binds to vitamin B_{12}. Vitamin B_{12} is acid-sensitive and in binding to haptocorrin it can safely pass through the acidic stomach to the duodenum.

In the less acidic environment of the small intestine, pancreatic enzymes digest the glycoprotein carrier and vitamin B_{12} can then bind to intrinsic factor. This new complex is then absorbed by the epithelial cells (enterocytes) of the ileum. Inside the cells, vitamin B_{12} dissociates once again and binds to another protein, transcobalamin II; the new complex can then exit the epithelial cells to be carried to the liver.

== Site of secretion ==
The site and cell type of formation of the intrinsic factor varies in different species. Intrinsic factor is secreted in oxyntic gastric glands and predominantly by parietal cells of the stomach fundus and body in humans, while it is produced by chief cells in the stomach body in rodents. In pigs it is obtained from the pylorus and beginning of the duodenum.

It is present in the gastric juice as well as in the gastric mucous membrane. The optimum pH for its action is approximately 7. Its concentration does not correlate with the amount of HCl or pepsin in the gastric juice, e.g., intrinsic factor may be present even when pepsin is largely absent. The amount of human gastric intrinsic factor limits normal efficient absorption of B_{12} to about 2 μg per meal, a nominally adequate intake of B_{12}.

== Insufficiency ==
In pernicious anemia, which is usually an autoimmune disease, autoantibodies directed against intrinsic factor or parietal cells themselves lead to an intrinsic factor deficiency, malabsorption of vitamin B_{12}, and subsequent megaloblastic anemia. Atrophic gastritis can also cause intrinsic factor deficiency and anemia through damage to the parietal cells of the stomach wall. Pancreatic exocrine insufficiency can interfere with normal dissociation of vitamin B_{12} from its binding proteins in the small intestine, preventing its absorption via the intrinsic factor complex. Other risk factors contributing to pernicious anemia are anything that damages or removes a portion of the stomach's parietal cells, including bariatric surgery, gastric tumors, gastric ulcers, and excessive consumption of alcohol.

Mutations in the CBLIF gene (previously referred as GIF, gastric intrinsic factor) are responsible for a rare inheritable disease called intrinsic factor deficiency which results in malabsorption of vitamin B_{12}.

=== Treatment ===
In most countries, intramuscular injections of vitamin B_{12} are used to treat pernicious anemia. Orally administered vitamin B_{12} is absorbed without intrinsic factor, but at levels of less than one percent than if intrinsic factor is present. There are not enough studies on whether pills are as effective in improving or eliminating symptoms as parenteral treatment.

Vitamin B_{12} can also be given sublingually, but there is no evidence that this route of administration is superior to the oral route, and only Canada and Sweden routinely prescribe this route of administration.

Vitamin B_{12} absorption is a multistep process that involves the stomach, pancreas and small intestine, and is mediated by two carriers: haptocorrin (transcobalamin I) and intrinsic factor. Because haptocorrin binds to the acid-sensitive vitamin B_{12}, it can safely pass through the acidic stomach to the duodenum, given time in the mouth.
