= LRP2 =

Mammalian protein found in Homo sapiens

Identifiers
- Aliases: LRP2, DBS, GP330, LDL receptor related protein 2, LRP-2
- External IDs: OMIM: 600073; MGI: 95794; GeneCards: LRP2
Available structures
| PDB | Ortholog search: PDBe RCSB |
| PDB | List of PDB id codes 2M0P |

Gene location (Human)
| Chr. | Chromosome 2 (human) |
| Band | 2q31.1 | Start | 169,127,109 bp |
| Band | 2q31.1 | End | 169,362,534 bp |

Gene location (Mouse)
| Chr. | Chromosome 2 (mouse) |
| Band | 2 C2|2 40.74 cM | Start | 69,254,684 bp |
| Band | 2 C2|2 40.74 cM | End | 69,416,409 bp |
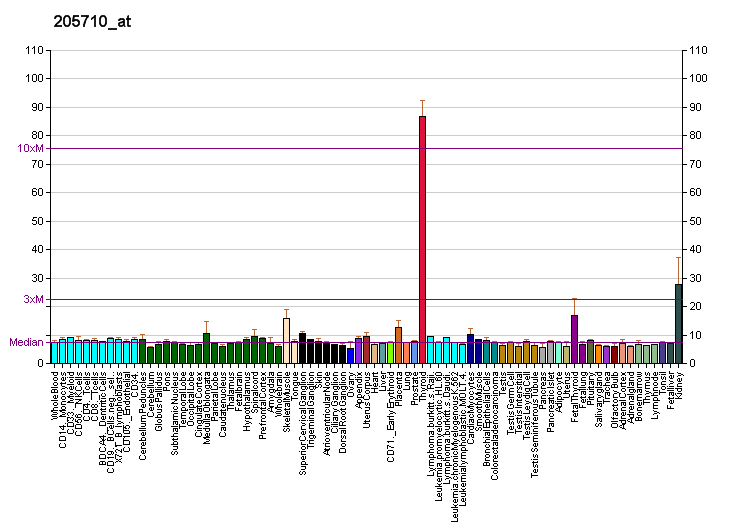
RNA expression pattern
| Bgee | Human / Mouse (ortholog); Top expressed in: corpus callosum; human kidney; buccal mucosa cell; kidney tubule; inferior ganglion of vagus nerve; thyroid gland; retinal pigment epithelium; germinal epithelium; left lobe of thyroid gland; right lobe of thyroid gland / Top expressed in: vestibular membrane of cochlear duct; human kidney; stria vascularis; right kidney; yolk sac; efferent ductule; olfactory epithelium; vestibular sensory epithelium; epiblast; glomerulus; More reference expression data |
| BioGPS | More reference expression data |
Gene ontology
| Molecular function | calcium ion binding; SH3 domain binding; metal ion binding; protein binding; low-density lipoprotein particle receptor activity; chaperone binding |
| Cellular component | integral component of membrane; endosome; Golgi apparatus; membrane; receptor complex; plasma membrane; endocytic vesicle; apical part of cell; brush border membrane; lysosomal membrane; apical plasma membrane; endoplasmic reticulum; brush border; clathrin-coated pit; lysosome; extracellular exosome; clathrin-coated vesicle membrane; external side of plasma membrane; axon; dendrite; endosome lumen; cell projection |
| Biological process | endocytosis; ventricular septum development; vitamin D metabolic process; lipid metabolism; receptor-mediated endocytosis; coronary vasculature development; retinoid metabolic process; aorta development; development of the heart; forebrain development; cell population proliferation; vitamin metabolic process; lipoprotein transport; membrane organization; neural tube closure; secondary heart field specification; outflow tract septum morphogenesis; ventricular compact myocardium morphogenesis; nervous system development; hearing; male gonad development; metal ion transport; negative regulation of BMP signaling pathway; positive regulation of neurogenesis; vagina development; coronary artery morphogenesis; pulmonary artery morphogenesis; positive regulation of oligodendrocyte progenitor proliferation; neuron projection arborization; folate import across plasma membrane; positive regulation of lysosomal protein catabolic process |
Sources:Amigo / QuickGO
Orthologs
| Databases | NCBI: entry; OMA: entry |
| Species | Human | Mouse |
| Entrez | 4036 | 14725 |
| Ensembl | ENSG00000081479 | ENSMUSG00000027070 |
| UniProt | P98164 | A2ARV4 |
| RefSeq (mRNA) | NM_004525 | NM_001081088 |
| RefSeq (protein) | NP_004516 | NP_001074557 |
| Location (UCSC) | Chr 2: 169.13 – 169.36 Mb | Chr 2: 69.25 – 69.42 Mb |
| PubMed search |
- Wikidata
| View/Edit Human | View/Edit Mouse |

Low density lipoprotein receptor-related protein 2 also known as LRP-2 or megalin is a protein which in humans is encoded by the LRP2 gene.

== Function ==
LRP2 was identified as the antigen of rat experimental membranous nephropathy (Heyman nephritis) and originally named gp330 and subsequently megalin and later LRP2. LRP2/megalin is a multiligand binding receptor found in the plasma membrane of many absorptive epithelial cells. LRP2 is an approximately 600kDa (4665 amino acids) transmembrane glycoprotein with structural similarities to the low density lipoprotein receptor (LDLR). LRP2 has a NPXY motif that is the binding site for Dab2 to initiate clathrin-mediated endocytosis. LRP2 forms a homodimer that changes conformation in response to pH. At pH 7.5 (extracellular pH), LRP2 is considered active, with the leucine loops in an open conformation to allow ligands to bind. At acidic endosomal pHs, the leucine loops collapse to prevent ligands binding.

LRP2 is expressed in epithelial cells of the thyroid (thyrocytes), where it can serve as a receptor for the protein thyroglobulin (Tg). LRP2 is also expressed on the apical surface of epithelial cells in the proximal tubule of the kidney. It is highly expressed in the first segment (S1) of the proximal tubule, with decreasing expression in the second (S2) and third segment (S3) of the proximal tubule. LRP2 is also expressed in podocytes, and antigenic response to LRP2 in podocytes is the primary cause of Heymann nephritis in rats.

LRP2/megalin functions to mediate endocytosis of ligands leading to degradation in lysosomes or transcytosis. LRP2/megalin can also form complexes with CUBAM, the cubilin and amnionless complex. Those complexes are able to reabsorb several molecules and can be inhibited by sodium maleate. LRP2 and CUBAM are responsible for the uptake of most of the filtered proteins that escape the glomerular filtration barrier in the proximal tubule of the kidney. The endocytic capacity of the proximal tubule cells is dictated by the combined function of LRP2, CUBAM, and Dab2.

The epithelial cells of the proximal tubule are highly polarized and have a robust apical endocytic pathway, subapical compartmentalization, and large endocytic capacity. This pathway is mediated by LRP2 and CUBAM, where Dab2 binds to the cytoplasmic tails of both LRP2 and CUBAM to initiate clathrin-coated endocytosis. Once internalized, the endosomes release their clathrin coats and fuse with a dense subapical network of tubules to recycle receptors back to the apical surface. As the endosomes acidify, LRP2 release its cargo and undergoes a conformational change which collapses the binding pockets to inhibit ligands rebinding to LRP2 in the endosomes. Recycling of the LRP2 occurs from apical vacuoles with Rab11a positive endosomes, also referred to as dense apical tubules. The vesicles are directed back to the plasma membrane where LRP2 undergoes another conformational change due to the change in pH and becomes active again. According to LRP2/megalin kinetic modeling, the rate of megalin recycling and return to the apical surface from dense apical tubules has the largest impact on determining the overall endocytic capacity of proximal tubule cells and the endocytic rate of LRP2. The fraction of LRP2 at the apical surface is important for the continued ability of the protein to reabsorb filtered proteins in the proximal tubule to maintain the robust endocytic capacity of these cells.

== Clinical significance ==
Disfunction in the LRP2-mediated endocytic trafficking and endocytic capacity in the proximal tubule can result in low molecular weight proteinuria, which is a hallmark of many diseases.

Mutations in the LRP2 gene are associated with Donnai-Barrow syndrome.

Dent's Disease (Dent 1) is associated with a drop in LRP2/megalin protein level in the proximal tubule with no detectable decrease in mRNA, suggesting that the loss of ClC-5, the gene mutated in Dent's Disease, shortens the half-life of the LRP2 receptor. The loss of ClC-5 has been found to delay the early endosome maturation in the LRP2 trafficking in the proximal tubule cells.

LRP2 has been shown to play a role in the development of nephrotoxic acute kidney injury (AKI) by mediating the uptake of nephrotoxic agents. However, there have been no further studies to show the functional importance of LRP2 or CUBAM in the progression of AKI.

A decrease in LRP2 receptor expression has been reported in animal models of acute and chronic kidney diseases.

== Interactions ==
LRP2 has been shown to associate with the following proteins in the plasma membrane/cytosol of cells:

- CUBAM,
- DAB2,
- DLG4,
- GIPC1,
- ITGB1BP1,
- LDL-receptor-related protein associated protein,
- LDLRAP1,
- MAGI1,
- MAPK8IP1,
- MAPK8IP2,
- NOS1AP, and
- SYNJ2BP.

LRP2 has been shown to bind to the following ligands:

- Albumin
- Vitamin D-binding protein
- Hemoglobin
- Myoglobin
- Angiotensin II
- Insulin
- Leptin
- Prolactin
- Epidermal Growth Factor
- Cathepsin B
- Immunoglobulin light chains
- Ca^{2+}
