= Olga Imerslund =

Norwegian pediatrician

Olga Imerslund (9 April 1907 – 23 August 1987) was a renowned Norwegian paediatrician, best known for her contribution to identification and naming of the Imerslund-Gräsbeck syndrome.

Discovered simultaneously by Ralph Gräsbeck, Imerslund–Gräsbeck syndrome is a very rare genetic disease; a form of vitamin B_{12} deficiency causing anaemia. The malabsorption of vitamin B_{12} characteristic of the disease is due to genetic malfunction of the Cubam receptor located in the terminal ileum.

Imerslund was born at Vang Municipality in Hedmark, Norway. She studied medicine at the University of Oslo (1936).

During her career, Imerslund was associated with a number of hospitals including Rikshospitalet at the University of Oslo .
