= Najman =

Najman is a surname. In Yiddish it is a variant of German language surname Neumann which means "new man". The surname is also used in Prelog, Croatia. Notable people with the surname include:

- Dina Najman, American rabbi
- Dindar Najman, Iraqi politician
- Emil Najman (1907–1989), Croatian pediatrician
- Hindy Najman, American scholar
- Maurice Najman, French journalist
