= Imerslund–Gräsbeck syndrome =

- Other names: Imerslund–Najman–Gräsbeck syndrome, Imerslund–Gräsbeck disease (IGS or INGS), Imerslund syndrome, Congenital cobalamin malabsorption or Autosomal recessive megaloblastic anemia (MGA1)
- This condition is inherited via an autosomal recessive manner.

Imerslund–Gräsbeck syndrome is a rare autosomal recessive, familial form of vitamin B12 deficiency caused by malfunction of the "Cubam" receptor located in the terminal ileum. This receptor is composed of two proteins, amnionless (AMN), and cubilin. A defect in either of these protein components can cause this syndrome. This is a rare disease, with a prevalence about 1 in 200,000, and is usually seen in patients of European ancestry.

Vitamin B_{12} is an important vitamin needed for proper functioning of the bone marrow; if deficient, this may lead to decreased marrow output and anemia. Vitamin B_{12} has two forms, one of which, along with folate, is important in DNA synthesis. Vitamin B_{12} is sensitive to acid deformation in the stomach, so a molecule called haptocorrin (R-factor), protects it in the stomach. In the small intestine, a molecule named intrinsic factor (IF), allows vitamin B_{12} to be absorbed in the ileum. IGS is caused by a mutation in the receptors located in the terminal portion of ileum. This is a very rare, and unlikely cause of vitamin B_{12} deficiency but is a cause nonetheless.

== Signs and symptoms ==
Defined as those seen in any macrocytic, megaloblastic anemia:

- Anemia: causing fatigue, conjunctival pallor, pale complexion, and in some cases, a mild icterus (yellowing of the eye).
- Glossitis ("shiny tongue"): shiny, glossy tongue.
- Cheilosis (stomatitis): Inflammation of the edges of the lips and the oral mucosa.
- Tabes dorsalis ("subacute combined degeneration of the spinal cord"): This involves the posterior section of the spinal cord and therefore involves proprioception (sense of position), touch, sense of vibration and in severe cases the lateral corticospinal tract, causing spastic paralysis of the limbs.
- Peripheral neuropathy: tingling sensation in the arms and legs.
- Pancytopenia: decreased number of blood cells of all lineages (RBCs, leucocytes, platelets), due to decreased bone marrow production.
- Methylmalonic acidemia: defined as blood having an unusually high concentration of methylmalonyl CoA.
- Peripheral findings such as hypersegmented neutrophils and large RBCs on high field view of the blood smears.
- Laboratory findings indicating increased MCV (Mean Corpuscular Volume), decreased Hgb/Hct (indicating anemia), and decreased value of vitamin B_{12} in the blood.
- Proteinuria: protein found in the urine detected by analysis or by dipstick.
- Reversal of all symptoms except neurological symptoms, by intramuscular injection of vitamin B_{12}.
- Schilling test indicating no radioactive vitamin B_{12} in the urine. (This test has dropped out of favor and should not be tried in patients with any form of renal failure).

== Genetics ==
The disease is autosomal recessive, and can therefore skip generations. Mutations in either amnionless (AMN) or cubilin can be the culprit. Due to its autosomal recessive pattern of inheritance, affected individuals (persons possessing a homozygous recessive genotype) need to undergo genetic counseling to identify the risk of family members who might be heterozygous genetic carriers. Certain mutations on the CUBN or AMN (genes that encode cubilin and amnionless respectively) have been identified through genetic analysis, and ethnic susceptibility of some of the mutations was indicated from the current research. It has been further suggested that mutations on CUBN were restricted to exon 1-28 which encoded amnionless binding domains (EGF) and IF-Cbl binding region of cubilin, while AMN mutations primarily clustered in intron 8-11 and transmembrane domain in exon 10. Some interesting aspects of particular mutations were also elucidated by the researchers, for example, CUBN mutation c.3890C>T; p.Pro1297Leu, was considered to be a Finnish founder mutation presenting mostly in homozygous status, while an AMN mutation c.208-2A>G, which was thought to account for 15% IGS cases around the world, was postulated as an ancient founder mutation that can trace back to approximately 13,600 years ago.

== Pathogenesis ==
Vitamin B_{12}, is an essential water-soluble vitamin found in animal products (such as liver, meat, fish, and dairy products). Vitamin B_{12} is not found in plant sources; a vegetarian diet can be a risk factor for vitamin B_{12} deficiency. Normal daily intake of vitamin B_{12} is 7–30 micro gram, cooking has minimal effect on the structure of this vitamin. The minimal daily adult requirement is 1–3 micro gram, and the human body is able to store at any one time about 2–3 milligram, which is sufficient for at least 2 years of impeccable functioning before the source is depleted. In terms of absorption, no more than 2–3 microgram of vitamin B_{12} can be absorbed on a daily basis, with some 5–10 microgram of the vitamin B_{12} involved in enterohepatic circulation. This is in general a principal characteristic of water-soluble vitamins, in that no matter the oral intake, there is a certain threshold for intestinal absorption hence, low or non-existent chance of intoxication, as opposed to fat-soluble vitamins.

Vitamin B_{12} has a major function in the nuclear replication of the DNA. It is therefore logical that its deficiency causes decrease bone marrow production, one of the most common manifestations of which is decreased red blood cell production or as it is referred to medically, anemia. Vitamin B_{12} however has two major forms in the human body:

- Deoxyadenosyl B_{12} or as it is sometimes referred to Ado B_{12}: Ado B_{12} is essential for acid-base maintenance of the blood, simply because Ado B_{12} is the catalyst that assists the conversion of methylmalonyl CoA into succinyl CoA. In absence of vitamin B_{12}, levels of methylmalonyl CoA increase, and this is in fact a great way to distinguish folate deficiency macrocytic anemia, from vitamin B_{12} deficiency anemia. The following is the reaction in which Ado B_{12}, plays a pivotal role:

Propionyl CoA → Methylmalonyl CoA → Succinyl CoA

- Methyl B_{12}: This form of vitamin B_{12} is essential for conversion of Methy-THF (methyl tetrahydrofolate) into THF, and methyl (CH_{3}). The methyl group is then used to add carbon, to homocysteine, converting it into methionine. Methionine is further converted to S-adenosyl methionine, which in turn gives of the extra carbon it received from THF, now to a DNA nucleotide, becoming S-adenosyl homocysteine. S-adenosyl Homocysteine, further loses its "S-adenosyl" attachment, to become homocysteine, and the cycle repeats yet again.

                              Methyl THF → CH3 + THF
                                            ↓                    
                               Homocysteine → Methionine
                       S-adenosyl ← ↑              ↓ ← S-adenosyl
                     S-adenosyl Homocysteine ← S-adenosyl Methionine
                                             ↓
                                            CH3
                                             ↓
                                         DNA → Methyl-DNA

It is therefore understood that vitamin B_{12} is involved in complex DNA synthesis, along with folate, as well as in acid-base metabolism. To understand the basic pathophysiology of Imerslund–Gräsbeck syndrome, it is imperative to understand the absorption of vitamin B_{12}. The following lists principal events that lead to absorption of vitamin B_{12} along the GI tract:

- Oral cavity: vitamin B_{12} containing food is ingested. Salivary glands produce haptocorrin, which binds vitamin B_{12}, creating a "vitamin B_{12}-Haptocorrin complex". This complex is then ingested via esophageal peristalsis into the stomach.
- Stomach: vitamin B_{12}-Haptocorrin, survives the low pH, highly osmotic environment of the stomach. Parietal cells produce hydrochloric acid (the effect of which Haptocorrin protects vitamin B_{12} from), and also intrinsic factor (IF). Intrinsic factor also has a high binding affinity for vitamin B_{12}, but because that position is already filled by Haptocorrin, free intrinsic factor, and "Haptocorrin-vitamin B_{12}" complex, empty from the stomach into the duodenum.
- duodenum: Pancreatic juice, produced by the pancreas, contains pancreatic proteases that break the haptocorrin, degrading it and freeing the vitamin B_{12}. Once free, vitamin B_{12}, binds with intrinsic factor (IF), to produce an "IF-vitamin B_{12}" complex.
- Ileum: Cubam, a receptor found in the terminal portion of the ileum is a specialized receptor complex. The complex is responsible for the recognition of the "vitamin B_{12}-IF" complex and initiating the endocytosis of the complex, resulting in absorption.

Cubam is composed of two molecules, amnionless (AMN) and cubilin. Cubilin is a multi-ligand protein that contains eight epidermal growth factor (EGF) repeats and 27 CUB domains, from which the four active domains (CUB5-8) collectively get involved in binding interaction with the IF-Cbl complex. Whereas, amnionless is an apical transmembrane protein which is expressed in both intestine and kidney, and it seems to assist the subcellular localization and endocytosis of the cubilin by binding to its amino-terminal residues. Cubilin specializes in recognition of the "vitamin B_{12}-IF" complex and attaches to it, while amnionless (AMN) is responsible for initiation of the endocytosis of complex and the subsequent absorption of vitamin B_{12}. It is at this point that the pathology of IGS syndrome occurs by preventing the absorption of vitamin B_{12}, and can be caused by a mutation in either the amnionless (AMN) portion or the cubilin portion of the receptor.

== Diagnosis ==
Diagnosis of Imerslund–Gräsbeck syndrome can be suspected by macrocytic anemia, vitamin B12 defieciency, and persistent proteinuria. Also, thrombocytopenia, high levels of homocysteine and methylmalonic acid in serum or urine, and moderate leukopenia and neutropenia can also be a diagnostic marker. The diagnosis gets confirmed by molecular testing of AMN and CUBN gene; Schilling test can be used.

== Treatment ==
Since the essential pathology is due to the inability to absorb vitamin B_{12} from the bowels, the solution is, therefore, intramuscular injections of vitamin B_{12}. Timing is essential, as some of the side effects of vitamin B_{12} deficiency are reversible (such as red blood cell (RBC) indices, peripheral RBC smear findings such as hypersegmented neutrophils, or even high levels of methylmalonyl CoA), but some side effects are irreversible as they are of a neurological source (such as tabes dorsalis, and peripheral neuropathy). High suspicion should be exercised when a neonate, or a pediatric patient presents with anemia, protein in the urine, sufficient vitamin B_{12} dietary intake, and no signs of pernicious anemia.

== Epidemiology ==
This is a rare disease with prevalence about 1 in 200,000 to 1 in 600,000. Studies showed that mutations in CUBN or AMN clustered particularly in the Scandinavian countries and the Eastern Mediterranean regions. Founder effect, higher clinical awareness to IGS, and frequent consanguineous marriages all play a role in the higher prevalence of IGS among these populations.

== History ==
The discovery and research of the syndrome is the result of the collective work done by a Norwegian pediatrician, Olga Imerslund, a Finnish physician and clinical biochemist, Armas Ralph Gustaf Gräsbeck, and Emil Najman, a pediatrician from Croatia.

== Sources ==
- Tanner, S. M.; Li, Z.; Bisson, R.; Acar, C.; Oner, C.; Oner, R.; Cetin, M.; Abdelaal, M. A.; Ismail, E. A.; Lissens, W.; Krahe, R.; Broch, H.; Gräsbeck, R.; De la Chapella, A. (2004). "Genetically heterogeneous selective intestinal malabsorption of vitamin B12: founder effects, consanguinity, and high clinical awareness explain aggregations in Scandinavia and the Middle East". Human Mutation. 23 (4): 327–333. doi:10.1002/humu.20014. PMID 15024727. S2CID 2486499.
- Tanner, S. M.; Sturm, A. C.; Baack, E. C.; Liyanarachchi, S.; De la Chapelle, A. (2012). "Inherited cobalamin malabsorption. Mutations in three genes reveal functional and ethnic patterns" (PDF). Orphanet Journal of Rare Diseases. 7 (56): 56. doi:10.1186/1750-1172-7-56. PMC 3462684. PMID 22929189.
