= SYNJ2BP =

Protein-coding gene in the species Homo sapiens

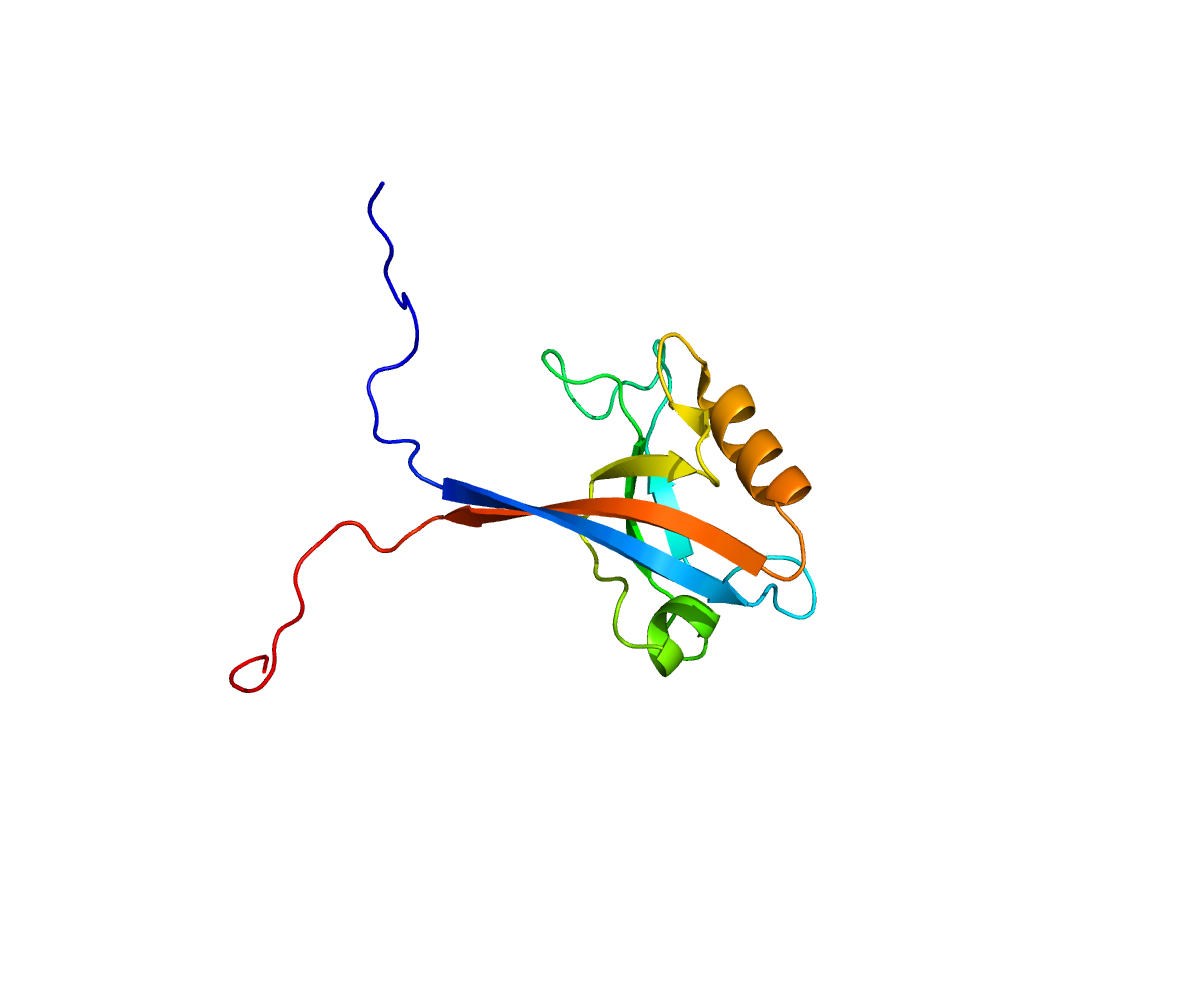

Identifiers
- Aliases: SYNJ2BP, ARIP2, OMP25, synaptojanin 2 binding protein
- External IDs: OMIM: 609411; MGI: 1344347; GeneCards: SYNJ2BP
Available structures
| PDB | Ortholog search: PDBe RCSB |
| PDB | List of PDB id codes 2ENO, 2JIK, 2JIN |

Gene location (Human)
| Chr. | Chromosome 14 (human) |
| Band | 14q24.2 | Start | 70,366,499 bp |
| Band | 14q24.2 | End | 70,417,090 bp |

Gene location (Mouse)
| Chr. | Chromosome 12 (mouse) |
| Band | 12 D1|12 37.73 cM | Start | 81,544,715 bp |
| Band | 12 D1|12 37.73 cM | End | 81,579,685 bp |
RNA expression pattern
| Bgee | Human / Mouse (ortholog); Top expressed in: renal medulla; cardia; body of tongue; pylorus; saphenous vein; biceps brachii; jejunum; vena cava; Skeletal muscle tissue of biceps brachii; Skeletal muscle tissue of rectus abdominis / Top expressed in: tunica media of zone of aorta; intercostal muscle; digastric muscle; sternocleidomastoid muscle; temporal muscle; ciliary body; triceps brachii muscle; saccule; otic placode; epithelium of stomach; More reference expression data |
| BioGPS | n/a |
Gene ontology
| Molecular function | protein binding; protein C-terminus binding; ionotropic glutamate receptor binding |
| Cellular component | integral component of membrane; mitochondrial outer membrane; membrane; mitochondrion; integral component of mitochondrial outer membrane; ionotropic glutamate receptor complex; basolateral plasma membrane; cell junction; neuromuscular junction; neuron projection; postsynaptic density membrane |
| Biological process | negative regulation of endothelial cell migration; negative regulation of angiogenesis; regulation of Notch signaling pathway; negative regulation of endothelial cell proliferation; negative regulation of sprouting angiogenesis; negative regulation of ERK1 and ERK2 cascade; protein targeting; Rho protein signal transduction; regulation of endocytosis; intracellular distribution of mitochondria; chemical synaptic transmission; receptor clustering; establishment or maintenance of epithelial cell apical/basal polarity; receptor localization to synapse; cell-cell adhesion |
Sources:Amigo / QuickGO
Orthologs
| Databases | NCBI: entry; OMA: entry |
| Species | Human | Mouse |
| Entrez | 55333 | 24071 |
| Ensembl | ENSG00000213463 | ENSMUSG00000090935 |
| UniProt | P57105 | Q9D6K5 |
| RefSeq (mRNA) | NM_018373 | NM_025292; NM_001309814 |
| RefSeq (protein) | NP_060843 | NP_001296743; NP_079568 |
| Location (UCSC) | Chr 14: 70.37 – 70.42 Mb | Chr 12: 81.54 – 81.58 Mb |
| PubMed search |
- Wikidata
| View/Edit Human | View/Edit Mouse |

Synaptojanin-2-binding protein is a protein that in humans is encoded by the SYNJ2BP gene.

== Interactions ==
SYNJ2BP has been shown to interact with:

- ACVR2A,
- ACVR2B,
- LRP1, and
- LRP2.
