= Serum vitamin B12 =

Medical laboratory test

Serum vitamin B_{12} is a medical laboratory test that measure vitamin B_{12} only in the blood binding to both transcobalamins. Most of the time, 80–94% of vitamin B_{12} in the blood binds to haptocorrin, while only 6–20% is binds to transcobalamin ll. Only transcobalamin ll is "active" and can be used by the body. Normal total body vitamin B_{12} is between 2 and 5 mg with 50% of that stored in the liver. Total serum vitamin B_{12} may not be a reliable biomarker for reflecting what the body stores inside cells. Vitamin B_{12} levels can be falsely high or low and data for sensitivity and specificity vary widely. There is no gold standard human assay to confirm a vitamin B_{12} deficiency.

Healthcare providers use this test when a vitamin B_{12} deficiency is suspected, which can cause anemia and irreversible nerve damage. The cutoff between normal vitamin B_{12} levels and deficiency varies by country and region. A diagnosis of vitamin B_{12} deficiency is determined by blood levels lower than 200 or 250 picograms per ml (148 or 185 picomoles per liter). Some people can have symptoms with their normal levels of the vitamin, or may have low levels despite having no symptoms. Other tests may be done to ensure individuals status. Measuring vitamin B_{12} values in individuals during or after treatment, in order to measure the effectiveness of treatment, is useless.

== Normal range ==
A blood test shows vitamin B_{12} levels in the blood. Vitamin B_{12} deficiency can be determined, but not always. This means it measures forms of vitamin B_{12} that are "active" and can be used by the body, as well as the "inactive" forms, which cannot. However, also normal or supraphysiological vitamin B_{12} levels should be carefully assessed in the context of the individual state of health. Elevated or normal serum vitamin B_{12} levels may also be associated with a functional vitamin deficiency. Functional deficiency has been described despite high B_{12} concentrations and is due to a failure of cellular uptake, intracellular processing, trafficking, or utilization. However, low vitamin B_{12} levels may occur other than the true deficiency for various reasons and circumstances. High or supraphysiological serum levels are usually not of concern, although without supplementation they have been associated with many pathological conditions.

- Reference range for vitamin B_{12}:
  - 200 to 1000 picograms per ml (148 to 748 picomoles per liter)

Laboratories often use different units and "normal" may vary by population and the lab techniques used. Some researchers have suggested that current standards for vitamin B_{12} levels are too low.
