= CLCN3 =

Protein-coding gene in humans

Identifiers
- Aliases: CLCN3, CLC3, ClC-3, chloride voltage-gated channel 3, NEDSBA, NEDHYBA
- External IDs: OMIM: 600580; MGI: 103555; GeneCards: CLCN3

Gene location (Human)
Chr.	Chromosome 4 (human)
Band	4q33	Start	169,612,633 bp
Band	4q33	End	169,723,673 bp

Gene location (Mouse)
Chr.	Chromosome 8 (mouse)
Band	8 B3.1|8 30.9 cM	Start	61,363,423 bp
Band	8 B3.1|8 30.9 cM	End	61,436,334 bp
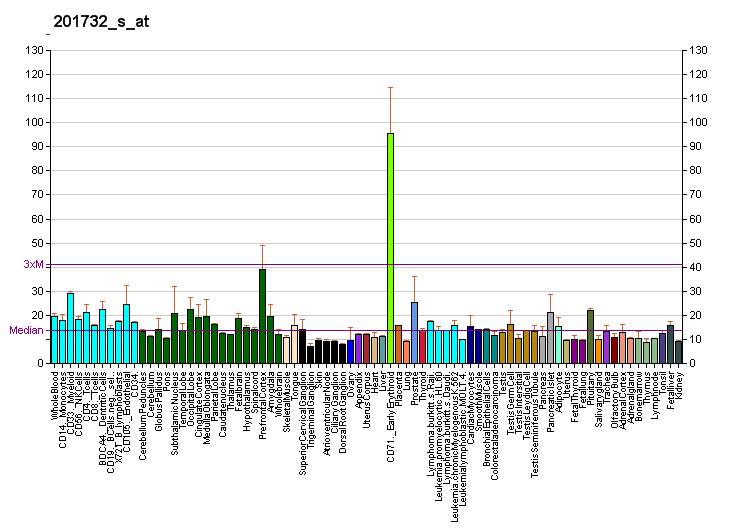

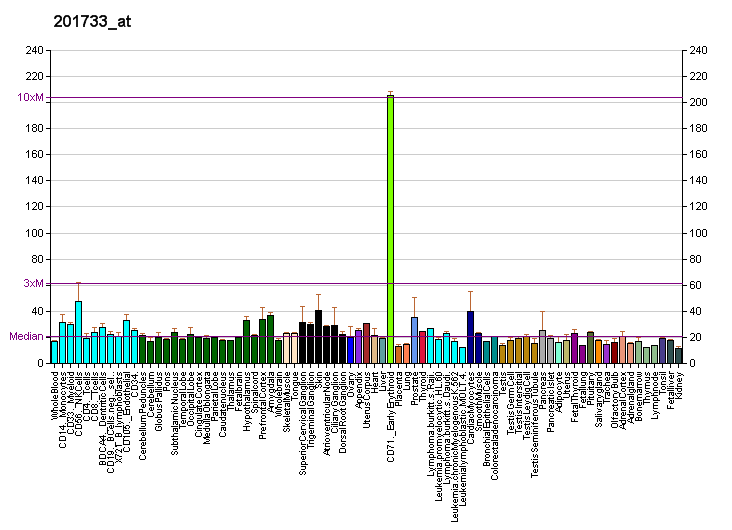

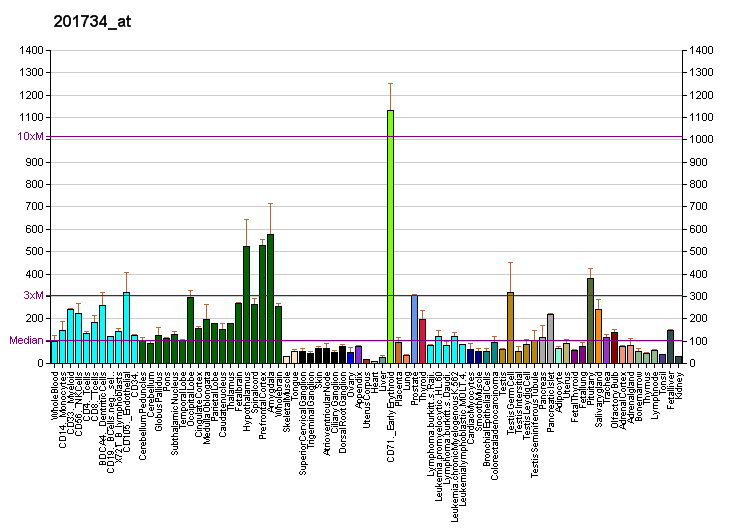
RNA expression pattern
Bgee	Human / Mouse (ortholog); Top expressed in: mucosa of sigmoid colon; endothelial cell; Brodmann area 46; Epithelium of choroid plexus; retinal pigment epithelium; postcentral gyrus; islet of Langerhans; parotid gland; right ventricle; superior vestibular nucleus / Top expressed in: Rostral migratory stream; mammillary body; lateral septal nucleus; ventromedial nucleus; lateral geniculate nucleus; lateral hypothalamus; cingulate gyrus; anterior amygdaloid area; paraventricular nucleus of hypothalamus; subiculum; More reference expression data
BioGPS	More reference expression data
Gene ontology
Molecular function	nucleotide binding; volume-sensitive chloride channel activity; PDZ domain binding; protein homodimerization activity; ion channel activity; protein binding; protein heterodimerization activity; antiporter activity; ATP binding; chloride channel activity; voltage-gated chloride channel activity; solute:proton antiporter activity; chloride ion binding
Cellular component	integral component of membrane; endosome; late endosome; Golgi apparatus; early endosome membrane; membrane; late endosome membrane; synaptic vesicle; vesicle membrane; Golgi membrane; plasma membrane; transport vesicle membrane; secretory granule; cell surface; early endosome; specific granule; phagocytic vesicle; external side of plasma membrane; cytoplasmic vesicle; integral component of plasma membrane
Biological process	negative regulation of cell volume; endosomal lumen acidification; ion transport; regulation of anion transmembrane transport; chloride transport; regulation of pH; chloride transmembrane transport; regulation of anion transport; transmembrane transport; transport; synaptic vesicle lumen acidification
Sources:Amigo / QuickGO
Orthologs
Databases	NCBI: entry; OMA: entry
Species	Human	Mouse
Entrez	1182	12725
Ensembl	ENSG00000109572	ENSMUSG00000004319
UniProt	P51790	P51791
RefSeq (mRNA)	NM_001243372; NM_001243374; NM_001829; NM_173872	NM_007711; NM_173873; NM_173874; NM_173876
RefSeq (protein)	NP_001230301; NP_001230303; NP_001820; NP_776297	NP_031737; NP_776298; NP_776299; NP_776301
Location (UCSC)	Chr 4: 169.61 – 169.72 Mb	Chr 8: 61.36 – 61.44 Mb
PubMed search
- Wikidata
View/Edit Human	View/Edit Mouse

2Cl^{-}/H^{+} exchanger 3 is a protein that in humans is encoded by the CLCN3 gene.

== Interactions ==
CLCN3 has been shown to interact with PDZK1 and TMEM9.

== See also ==
- Chloride channel
