= CLCN4 =

Protein-coding gene in humans

Identifiers
- Aliases: CLCN4, CLC4, ClC-4, ClC-4A, chloride voltage-gated channel 4, MRX15, MRX49, MRXSRC
- External IDs: OMIM: 302910; MGI: 104571; GeneCards: CLCN4

Gene location (Human)
Chr.	X chromosome (human)
Band	Xp22.2	Start	10,156,975 bp
Band	Xp22.2	End	10,237,660 bp

Gene location (Mouse)
Chr.	Chromosome 7 (mouse)
Band	7 A1|7 4.23 cM	Start	7,282,309 bp
Band	7 A1|7 4.23 cM	End	7,300,851 bp
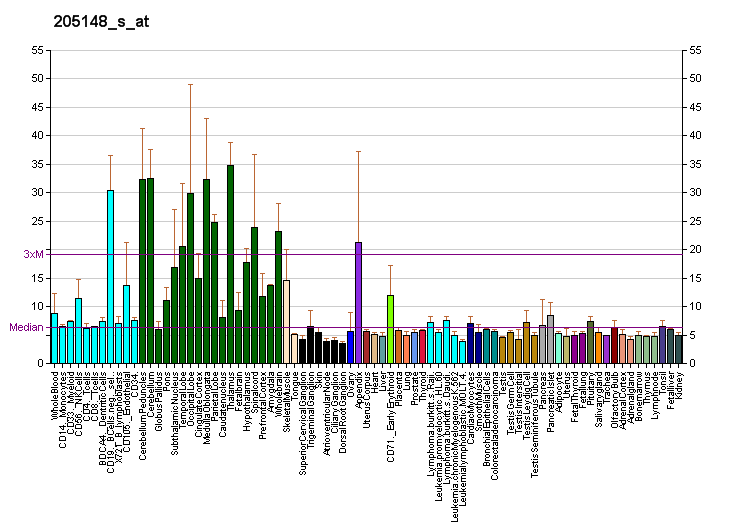

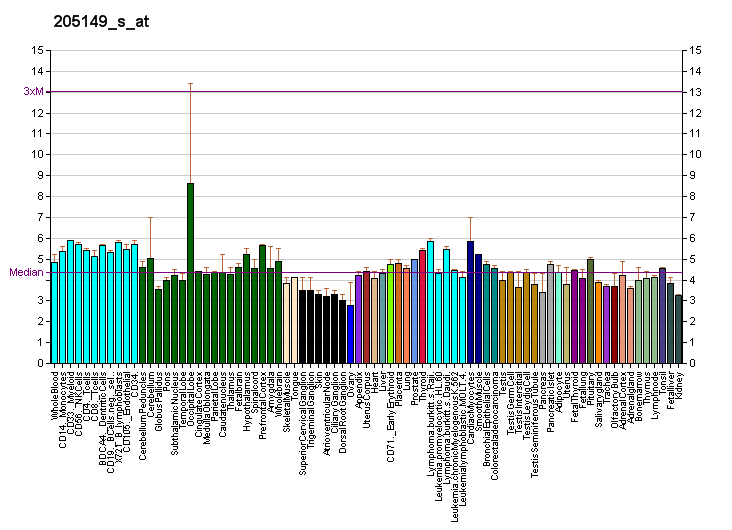
RNA expression pattern
Bgee	Human / Mouse (ortholog); Top expressed in: middle temporal gyrus; Brodmann area 23; postcentral gyrus; orbitofrontal cortex; biceps brachii; corpus epididymis; lateral nuclear group of thalamus; Skeletal muscle tissue of biceps brachii; endothelial cell; superior frontal gyrus / Top expressed in: barrel cortex; medial geniculate nucleus; Rostral migratory stream; medial dorsal nucleus; inferior colliculi; deep cerebellar nuclei; Region I of hippocampus proper; habenula; pontine nuclei; globus pallidus; More reference expression data
BioGPS	More reference expression data
Gene ontology
Molecular function	nucleotide binding; ATP binding; chloride channel activity; antiporter activity; voltage-gated chloride channel activity; solute:proton antiporter activity; chloride ion binding
Cellular component	integral component of membrane; endosome; endosome membrane; early endosome membrane; membrane; late endosome membrane; integral component of plasma membrane; endoplasmic reticulum; endoplasmic reticulum membrane; early endosome; Golgi apparatus; plasma membrane
Biological process	ion transmembrane transport; ion transport; chloride transmembrane transport; transmembrane transport; chloride transport; proton transmembrane transport
Sources:Amigo / QuickGO
Orthologs
Databases	NCBI: entry; OMA: entry
Species	Human	Mouse
Entrez	1183	12727
Ensembl	ENSG00000073464	ENSMUSG00000000605
UniProt	P51793	Q61418
RefSeq (mRNA)	NM_001830; NM_001256944	NM_011334; NM_001302386; NM_001302387; NM_001357102; NM_001357103 NM_001357104
RefSeq (protein)	NP_001243873; NP_001821	NP_001289315; NP_001289316; NP_035464; NP_001344031; NP_001344032 NP_001344033
Location (UCSC)	Chr X: 10.16 – 10.24 Mb	Chr 7: 7.28 – 7.3 Mb
PubMed search
- Wikidata
View/Edit Human	View/Edit Mouse

H(+)/Cl(-) exchange transporter 4 is a protein that in humans is encoded by the CLCN4 gene.

== Function ==
The CLCN family of voltage-dependent chloride channel genes comprises nine members (CLCN1-7, Ka and Kb) which demonstrate quite diverse functional characteristics while sharing significant sequence homology. Chloride channel 4 has an evolutionary conserved CpG island and is conserved in both mouse and hamster. This gene is mapped in close proximity to APXL (Apical protein Xenopus laevis-like) and OA1 (Ocular albinism type I), which are both located on the human X chromosome at band p22.3. The physiological role of chloride channel 4 remains unknown but may contribute to the pathogenesis of neuronal disorders.

== Clinical significance ==
Mutations in this gene have been linked to cases of early onset epilepsy

== See also ==
- Chloride channel
