= LDL-receptor-related protein-associated protein =

Protein-coding gene in the species Homo sapiens

LRPAP1
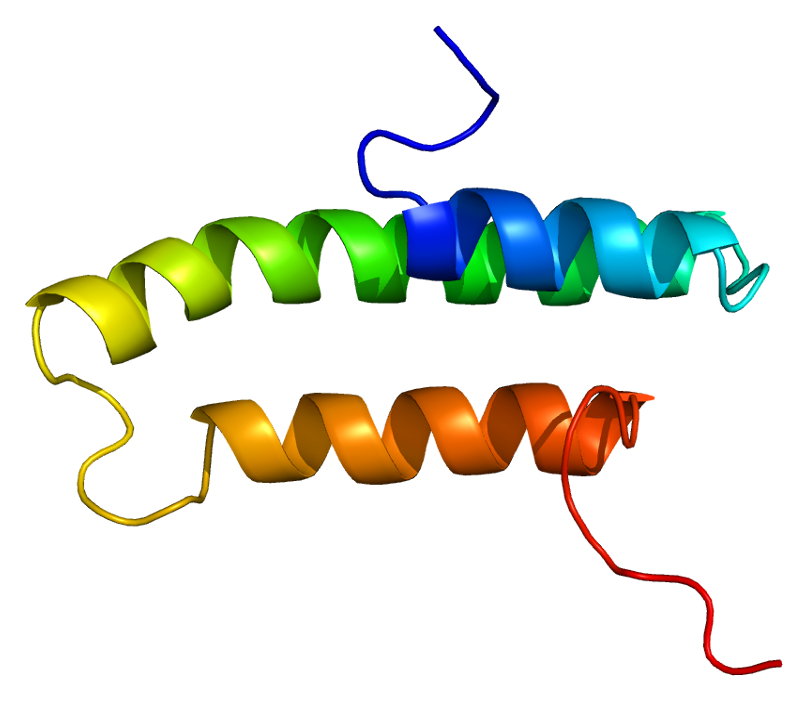

Identifiers
- Aliases: LRPAP1, A2MRAP, A2RAP, HBP44, MRAP, MYP23, RAP, alpha-2-MRAP, LDL-receptor-related protein associated protein, LDL receptor related protein associated protein 1
- External IDs: OMIM: 104225; MGI: 96829; GeneCards: LRPAP1
Available structures
PDB	Ortholog search: PDBe RCSB
PDB	List of PDB id codes 1LRE, 1NRE, 1OP1, 1OV2, 2FCW, 2FTU, 2FYL, 2P01, 2P03

Gene location (Human)
Chr.	Chromosome 4 (human)
Band	4p16.3	Start	3,503,612 bp
Band	4p16.3	End	3,532,446 bp

Gene location (Mouse)
Chr.	Chromosome 5 (mouse)
Band	5 B2|5 18.01 cM	Start	35,248,845 bp
Band	5 B2|5 18.01 cM	End	35,263,110 bp
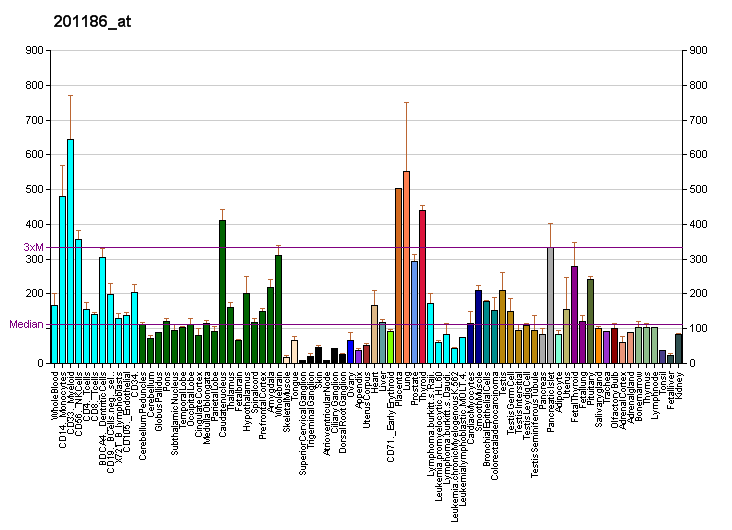
RNA expression pattern
Bgee	Human / Mouse (ortholog); Top expressed in: stromal cell of endometrium; right auricle of heart; right coronary artery; apex of heart; middle frontal gyrus; Descending thoracic aorta; putamen; caudate nucleus; ascending aorta; nucleus accumbens / Top expressed in: vestibular membrane of cochlear duct; stria vascularis; right kidney; vestibular sensory epithelium; Epithelium of choroid plexus; epithelium of lens; supraoptic nucleus; internal carotid artery; external carotid artery; human kidney; More reference expression data
BioGPS	More reference expression data
Gene ontology
Molecular function	lipase binding; very-low-density lipoprotein particle receptor binding; low-density lipoprotein particle receptor binding; protein binding; signaling receptor binding; heparin binding; receptor antagonist activity; amyloid-beta binding
Cellular component	cytoplasm; vesicle; cell surface; endoplasmic reticulum; rough endoplasmic reticulum; extracellular region; endosome; endoplasmic reticulum-Golgi intermediate compartment; Golgi apparatus; Golgi lumen; cis-Golgi network; plasma membrane; endosome lumen; rough endoplasmic reticulum lumen
Biological process	negative regulation of protein binding; negative regulation of very-low-density lipoprotein particle clearance; negative regulation of amyloid-beta clearance; regulation of receptor-mediated endocytosis; extracellular negative regulation of signal transduction; negative regulation of receptor internalization; negative regulation of cell death; amyloid-beta clearance by transcytosis; positive regulation of amyloid-beta clearance; negative regulation of signaling receptor activity
Sources:Amigo / QuickGO
Orthologs
Databases	NCBI: entry; OMA: entry
Species	Human	Mouse
Entrez	4043	16976
Ensembl	ENSG00000163956	ENSMUSG00000029103
UniProt	P30533	P55302
RefSeq (mRNA)	NM_002337	NM_013587
RefSeq (protein)	NP_002328	NP_038615
Location (UCSC)	Chr 4: 3.5 – 3.53 Mb	Chr 5: 35.25 – 35.26 Mb
PubMed search
- Wikidata
View/Edit Human	View/Edit Mouse

Alpha-2-MRAP_N
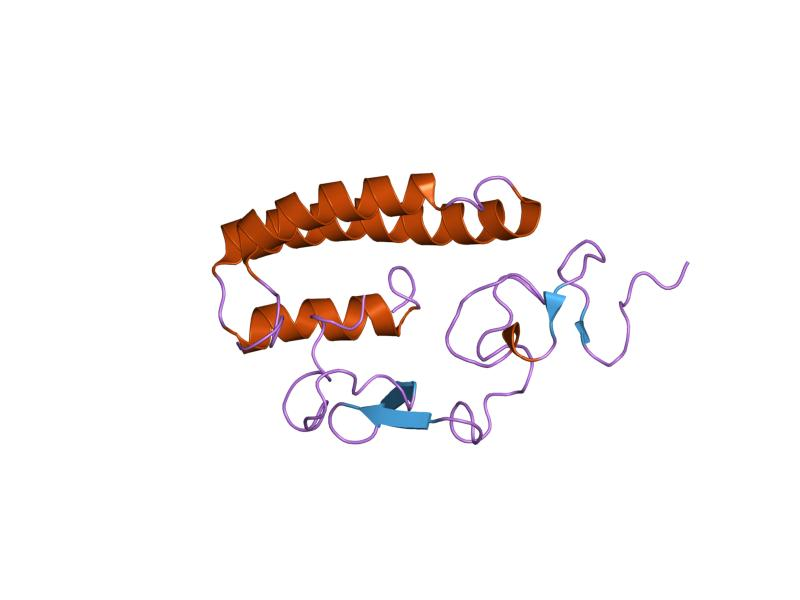
- haddock model of the complex between double module of lrp, cr56, and first domain of receptor associated protein, rap-d1.

Identifiers
- Symbol: Alpha-2-MRAP_N
- Pfam: PF06400
- InterPro: IPR009066
- SCOP2: 1lre / SCOPe / SUPFAM
Available protein structures:
- PDB: IPR009066 PF06400 (ECOD; PDBsum)
- AlphaFold: IPR009066; PF06400

Alpha-2-MRAP_C
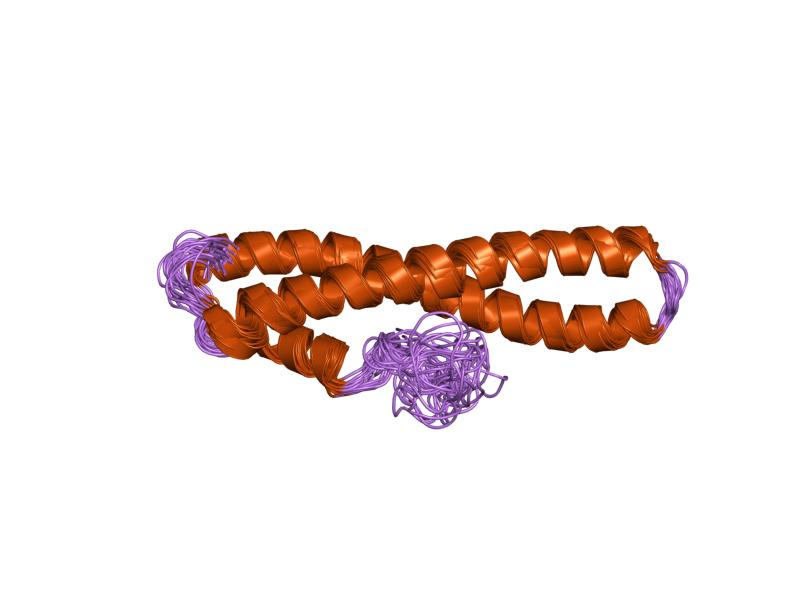
- solution structure of domain 3 of rap

Identifiers
- Symbol: Alpha-2-MRAP_C
- Pfam: PF06401
- InterPro: IPR010483
Available protein structures:
- PDB: IPR010483 PF06401 (ECOD; PDBsum)
- AlphaFold: IPR010483; PF06401

Low density lipoprotein receptor-related protein-associated protein 1 also known as LRPAP1 or RAP is a chaperone protein which in humans is encoded by the LRPAP1 gene.

== Function ==
LRPAP1 is involved with trafficking of certain members of the LDL receptor family including LRP1 and LRP2. It is a glycoprotein that binds to the alpha-2-macroglobulin receptor, as well as to other members of the low density lipoprotein receptor family. It acts to inhibit the binding of all known ligands for these receptors, and may prevent receptor aggregation and degradation in the endoplasmic reticulum, thereby acting as a molecular chaperone. It may be under the regulatory control of calmodulin, since it is able to bind calmodulin and be phosphorylated by calmodulin-dependent kinase II.

== Interactions ==
LDL-receptor-related protein-associated protein has been shown to interact with LRP2.

== Mutations and diseases related to LRPAP1 ==
Lipid metabolizing proteins may elevate susceptibility to dementia leading to differences in genetic makeup. PCR-restriction fragment length polymorphism technique is used for genotyping of LRPAP1 intron 5 insertion/deletion. The studies suggested that DD genotype and *D allele of LRPAP gene showed increased frequency for degenerative dementias on comparison with the control group and that LRPAP1-D allele remarkably increases the vulnerability to degenerative dementias. On genotyping of LRPAP1 polymorphism is observed because of 37 base pair insertion in intron 5. Also insertion allele being larger than deletion allele makes possible in detecting difference by gel electrophoresis. Suppression of receptor-binding domain of LRP LDLR is due to overexpression of LRPAP (the protein product of LRPAP gene). LRP gives protection across LDL by LRPAP and its downregulation may be subjected for an elevation of LDL and Ab-related neuronal toxicity as LRP supports in binding of ligand and internalization of LRP ligands like apo-E-enriched LDL cholesterol and Ab protein. Insertion/deletion is an intronic polymorphism of LRPAP gene, Influencing DD genotype and D allele for the synthesis of LRPAP protein can be lrp-mediated mechanism contributing to dementia. Concern for developing sensitivity for dementia is because of several shared common genetic platforms and DD genotype or D allele of LRPAP gene may be one such. So on 37-bp insertion/deletion that was studied as an intronic polymorphism, it could be having an unintended pursuit for lipid receptor protein by regulation of LRPAP expression, or it could be in linkage disequilibrium in addition to other biologically relevant polymorphism in the LRPAP1 or an adjacent gene in chromosome 4. Results being consistent with earlier study where the authors have endowed deletion allele frequency clearly high in late-onset Alzheimer's disease patients on comparison with non-demented aged controls.

Mendelian forms of myopia has been identified in four consanguineous families and are the likely causal mutations implementing exome /autozygome investigated to recognize homozygous truncating variants in LRPAP1. Influencing TGF-β activity, chaperone of LRP1 is encoded by LRPAP1.Notably salient deficiency of LRP1 and upregulation of TGF-β in affected individuals cells, the known data being consistent on the importance of TGF-β in remodeling for the sclera of myopia and the increased frequency in individuals for myopia having Marfan syndrome which has characteristics of upregulated TGF-β signaling. Analysizing the absence of the normal protein was done with immunoblot for affected individuals having LRPAP1 mutations revealing the mutations in LRPAP1 probability of loss-of-function mutations. Encoding (Low Density Lipoprotein Receptor-Related Protein Associated protein 1) LRPAP is a largely expressed gene, and a 357 amino acid protein thought as a chaperone binding and protecting the lipoproteins receptor-related proteins LRP1 and LRP2. A model suggested by a study wherein LRPAP1 leading to deficiency of LRP1 which was responsible to perturbation of TGF-β regulation and might cause abnormal ECM remodeling in the eye development. On observation for increasing axial length was one of the salient features of Marfan syndrome also resulting in TGF-β supported the model. Therefore, individuals having myopia responding to therapeutic strategy initiated before ECM remodeling could be considered as an approach for individuals with LRPAP1 related myopia.
