= Ralph Gräsbeck =

Finnish physician and clinical biochemist

Armas Ralph Gustaf Gräsbeck (July 6, 1930, Helsinki – January 22, 2016), best known as Ralph Gräsbeck, was a Finnish physician and clinical biochemist.

== Scientific achievements ==
Ralph Gräsbeck was best known for his contribution to the identification and naming of the Imerslund-Gräsbeck syndrome, simultaneously with Olga Imerslund. This a rare familial genetic condition, found in clusters in the Nordic countries and the Eastern Mediterranean, characterised by an inability to absorb vitamin B_{12} from food and by the consequent development of megaloblastic anaemia.

He made numerous other observations on the metabolism of vitamin B_{12}, including studies on an anaemia caused by fish tapeworm (Diphyllobothrium latum), the purification and isolation of intrinsic factor from gastric juice (1965), and the description of R-protein (today called haptocorrin).

He is also known for the introduction and elaboration of the concept of reference values in the clinical analysis of bodily fluids.

In addition, he published studies on factors that cause white blood cell division (so-called lymphocyte mitogens).

== Academic career ==
He graduated as an MD from Helsinki University in 1953 and subsequently trained in the 1950s in biochemistry at Johns Hopkins University in Baltimore and at Medical Nobel Institute, Karolinska Institute, Stockholm. His PhD (DMSci) dissertation was presented in 1956 and in 1959 he became docent at Helsinki University and the years 1960-1990 he was Chief Physician of the Laboratory Department of Maria Hospital, Helsinki. He was one of the founders of the Minerva Foundation Institute for Medical Research at the University of Helsinki and served as its director from 1971 to 1993. He became Professor in 1982. He was a board member and chairman of many Finnish, Scandinavian and International organisations and received numerous honours including Charter Member, Johns Hopkins Society of Scholars, the junior Jahre prize of Oslo University, the silver medal of the Finnish Society (Academy) of Sciences and Letters, and Doctor honoris causa of Poincaré University, Nancy, France.
