= CLCN6 =

Protein-coding gene in humans

Identifiers
- Aliases: CLCN6, CLC-6, chloride voltage-gated channel 6, CONRIBA
- External IDs: OMIM: 602726; MGI: 1347049; GeneCards: CLCN6

Gene location (Human)
Chr.	Chromosome 1 (human)
Band	1p36.22	Start	11,806,096 bp
Band	1p36.22	End	11,848,079 bp

Gene location (Mouse)
Chr.	Chromosome 4 (mouse)
Band	4 E1|4 78.67 cM	Start	148,088,716 bp
Band	4 E1|4 78.67 cM	End	148,123,278 bp
RNA expression pattern
Bgee	Human / Mouse (ortholog); Top expressed in: right testis; right auricle of heart; left testis; anterior pituitary; right hemisphere of cerebellum; sural nerve; middle temporal gyrus; prefrontal cortex; cingulate gyrus; anterior cingulate cortex / Top expressed in: substantia nigra; central gray substance of midbrain; retinal pigment epithelium; supraoptic nucleus; primary visual cortex; medial vestibular nucleus; superior frontal gyrus; neural layer of retina; nucleus of stria terminalis; anterior horn of spinal cord; More reference expression data
BioGPS	n/a
Gene ontology
Molecular function	nucleotide binding; ion channel activity; ATP binding; antiporter activity; voltage-gated chloride channel activity; protein binding; chloride transmembrane transporter activity; transmembrane transporter activity
Cellular component	integral component of membrane; lysosomal membrane; endosome; endosome membrane; membrane; intracellular membrane-bounded organelle
Biological process	cell volume homeostasis; response to mechanical stimulus; chloride transport; ion transmembrane transport; ion transport; signal transduction; regulation of anion transmembrane transport; transmembrane transport; chloride transmembrane transport; transport
Sources:Amigo / QuickGO
Orthologs
Databases	NCBI: entry; OMA: entry
Species	Human	Mouse
Entrez	1185	26372
Ensembl	ENSG00000011021	ENSMUSG00000029016
UniProt	P51797	O35454
RefSeq (mRNA)	NM_001256959; NM_001286; NM_021735; NM_021736; NM_021737	NM_011929
RefSeq (protein)	NP_001243888; NP_001277	NP_036059
Location (UCSC)	Chr 1: 11.81 – 11.85 Mb	Chr 4: 148.09 – 148.12 Mb
PubMed search
- Wikidata
View/Edit Human	View/Edit Mouse

Chloride transport protein 6 is a protein that in humans is encoded by the CLCN6 gene.

The CLCN family of voltage-dependent chloride channel genes comprises nine members (CLCN1-7, Ka and Kb) which demonstrate quite diverse functional characteristics while sharing significant sequence homology. Chloride channel 6 and 7 belong to a subbranch of this family. Chloride channel 6 has four different alternatively spliced transcript variants. This gene is in close vicinity to two other kidney-specific chloride channel genes, CLCNKA and CLCNKB.

== See also ==
- Chloride channel
