= Emil Najman =

Croatian pediatrician (1907–1989)

Emil Najman (21 January 1907 – 22 August 1989) was a Yugoslav pediatrician who in 1952 (with Beata Brausil) described the Imerslund-Gräsbeck syndrome.
