= Shroom family member 2 =

Protein-coding gene in the species Homo sapiens

SHROOM2

Identifiers
- Aliases: SHROOM2, APXL, HSAPXL, shroom family member 2
- External IDs: OMIM: 300103; MGI: 107194; GeneCards: SHROOM2

Gene location (Human)
Chr.	X chromosome (human)
Band	Xp22.2	Start	9,786,429 bp
Band	Xp22.2	End	9,949,443 bp

Gene location (Mouse)
Chr.	X chromosome (mouse)
Band	X F3|X 68.46 cM	Start	151,392,505 bp
Band	X F3|X 68.46 cM	End	151,552,461 bp
RNA expression pattern
Bgee	Human / Mouse (ortholog); Top expressed in: middle temporal gyrus; endothelial cell; Brodmann area 23; secondary oocyte; Brodmann area 46; primary visual cortex; retinal pigment epithelium; Brodmann area 10; hair follicle; orbitofrontal cortex / Top expressed in: superior colliculus; olfactory tubercle; sciatic nerve; piriform cortex; otolith organ; central gray substance of midbrain; utricle; substantia nigra; zygote; inferior colliculi; More reference expression data
BioGPS	n/a
Gene ontology
Molecular function	beta-catenin binding; protein binding; ligand-gated sodium channel activity; actin binding; actin filament binding
Cellular component	cytoplasm; membrane; bicellular tight junction; plasma membrane; cell junction; apical plasma membrane; cortical actin cytoskeleton; microtubule; cytoskeleton; extracellular exosome; adherens junction; apical junction complex
Biological process	eye pigment granule organization; ear development; actin filament bundle assembly; multicellular organism development; melanosome organization; brain development; lens morphogenesis in camera-type eye; cell morphogenesis; camera-type eye development; cellular pigment accumulation; cell migration; camera-type eye morphogenesis; sodium ion transmembrane transport; establishment of melanosome localization; apical protein localization; actin filament organization; actin cytoskeleton organization
Sources:Amigo / QuickGO
Orthologs
Databases	NCBI: entry; OMA: entry
Species	Human	Mouse
Entrez	357	110380
Ensembl	ENSG00000146950	ENSMUSG00000045180
UniProt	Q13796	A2ALU4
RefSeq (mRNA)	NM_001649; NM_001320663; NM_001320664	NM_001290684; NM_001290685; NM_001290686; NM_001290687; NM_172441 NM_001359158; NM_001359161; NM_001359163
RefSeq (protein)	NP_001307592; NP_001307593; NP_001640	NP_001277613; NP_001277614; NP_001277615; NP_001277616; NP_766029 NP_001346087; NP_001346090; NP_001346092
Location (UCSC)	Chr X: 9.79 – 9.95 Mb	Chr X: 151.39 – 151.55 Mb
PubMed search
- Wikidata
View/Edit Human	View/Edit Mouse

Shroom family member 2 is a protein that in humans is encoded by the SHROOM2 gene.

== Function ==
This gene represents the human homolog of Xenopus laevis apical protein (APX) gene, which is implicated in amiloride-sensitive sodium channel activity. It is expressed in endothelial cells and facilitates the formation of a contractile network within endothelial cells.

Depletion of this gene results in an increase in endothelial sprouting, migration, and angiogenesis. This gene is highly expressed in the retina, and is a strong candidate for ocular albinism type 1 syndrome. Alternatively spliced transcript variants have been found for this gene. [provided by RefSeq, Mar 2016].
