= TMEM9 =

Protein-coding gene in humans

Identifiers
- Aliases: TMEM9, TMEM9A, DERM4, transmembrane protein 9
- External IDs: OMIM: 616877; MGI: 1913491; HomoloGene: 9515; GeneCards: TMEM9; OMA:TMEM9 - orthologs

Gene location (Human)
Chr.	Chromosome 1 (human)
Band	1q32.1	Start	201,134,772 bp
Band	1q32.1	End	201,171,574 bp

Gene location (Mouse)
Chr.	Chromosome 1 (mouse)
Band	1|1 E4	Start	135,935,888 bp
Band	1|1 E4	End	135,963,080 bp
RNA expression pattern
Bgee	Human / Mouse (ortholog); Top expressed in: cingulate gyrus; anterior cingulate cortex; hypothalamus; right adrenal gland; right adrenal cortex; right frontal lobe; left adrenal gland; left adrenal cortex; nucleus accumbens; Brodmann area 9 / Top expressed in: neural layer of retina; yolk sac; dentate gyrus of hippocampal formation granule cell; saccule; right kidney; ventricular zone; primary visual cortex; otic vesicle; lens; superior frontal gyrus; More reference expression data
BioGPS	n/a
Gene ontology
Molecular function	molecular function
Cellular component	integral component of membrane; lysosomal membrane; endosome; late endosome; lysosome; membrane; late endosome membrane
Biological process	biological process
Sources:Amigo / QuickGO
Orthologs
Species	Human	Mouse
Entrez	252839	66241
Ensembl	ENSG00000116857	ENSMUSG00000026411
UniProt	Q9P0T7	Q9CR23
RefSeq (mRNA)	NM_001288564; NM_001288565; NM_001288566; NM_001288567; NM_001288568 NM_001288569; NM_001288570; NM_001288571; NM_016456	NM_001160145; NM_001160146; NM_025439
RefSeq (protein)	NP_001275493; NP_001275494; NP_001275495; NP_001275496; NP_001275497 NP_001275498; NP_001275499; NP_001275500; NP_057540	NP_001153617; NP_001153618; NP_079715
Location (UCSC)	Chr 1: 201.13 – 201.17 Mb	Chr 1: 135.94 – 135.96 Mb
PubMed search
- Wikidata
View/Edit Human	View/Edit Mouse

Transmembrane protein 9 is a protein that in humans is encoded by the TMEM9 gene.
