= Vitamin B12 deficiency =

Disorder resulting from low blood levels of vitamin B_{12}

Vitamin B_{12} deficiency
- Other names: Hypocobalaminemia, cobalamin deficiency
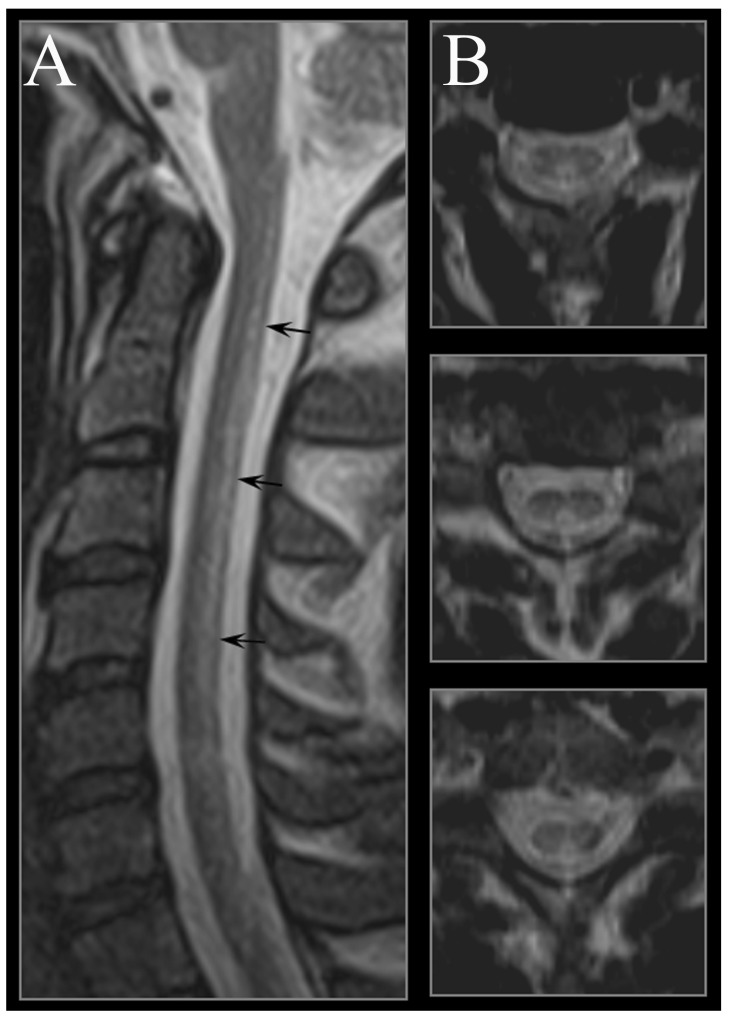
- Image of the cervical spinal cord in vitamin B_{12} deficiency showing subacute combined degeneration. (A) The midsagittal T2-weighted image shows linear hyperintensity in the posterior portion of the cervical tract of the spinal cord (black arrows). (B) Axial T2-weighted images reveal the selective involvement of the posterior columns.
- Specialty: Neurology, hematology
- Symptoms: Decreased ability to think, feeling tired, depression, irritability, abnormal sensations, changes in reflexes
- Complications: Megaloblastic anemia, irreversible damage to the brain and nervous system
- Causes: Poor absorption, decreased intake, increased requirements
- Diagnostic method: Blood tests, unexplained haemotoligcal or neurological symptoms
- Prevention: Supplementation in those at high risk
- Treatment: Supplementation by mouth or injection
- Frequency: 6% (< 60 years old), 20% (> 60 years old)

Vitamin B_{12} deficiency, also known as cobalamin deficiency, is the medical condition in which the blood and tissues have a lower than normal level of vitamin B_{12}.

Mild deficiencies may have few or absent symptoms. In moderate deficiencies, feeling tired, feeling faint, mouth ulcers, rapid breathing, upset stomach, pallor, hair loss, decreased ability to think and joint pain and the beginning of neurological symptoms, including abnormal sensations such as, numbness and tingling, and tinnitus may occur. Severe deficiencies may include symptoms of reduced heart function, suppression of bone marrow, as well as more various severe neurological symptoms possibly including sensory loss, abnormal balance and reflexes, memory and consciousness impairment, smell and taste problems, depression, irritability, confusion, and psychosis. If left untreated, some of these changes can become permanent. Onset of deficiency may take years to develop. In exclusively breastfed infants of vegan mothers, undetected and untreated deficiency can lead to poor growth, poor development, and difficulties with movement.

In healthy adults, vitamin B_{12} deficiency is not common, mainly because body stores of the vitamin are substantial and turnover is slow, with relatively low dietary requirements. Risk factors may occur possibly more in elderly people due to impaired intestinal absorption, and in children, premenopausal women, and pregnant women, whose diets are low in animal foods.

Causes are usually related to conditions that give rise to malabsorption of vitamin B_{12}, particularly autoimmune gastritis in pernicious anemia. Other conditions giving rise to malabsorption include surgical removal of the stomach, chronic inflammation of the pancreas, intestinal parasites, certain medications such as long-term use of proton pump inhibitors, H2-receptor blockers, and metformin, and some genetic disorders. Deficiency can also be caused by inadequate dietary intake such as with the diets of vegetarians, and vegans, and in the malnourished. Diagnosis can be challenging, based on blood tests, and whether if there an unexplained haemotoligcal or neurological symptoms found. Elevated methylmalonic acid levels may also indicate a deficiency.

Treatment is by vitamin B_{12} supplementation, either by mouth or by injection. If no reversible cause is found, or when found it cannot be eliminated, lifelong vitamin B_{12} administration is usually recommended. Vitamin B_{12} deficiency is preventable with supplements, which are recommended for pregnant vegetarians and vegans, and not harmful in others.

Vitamin B_{12} deficiency in the US and the UK is estimated to occur in about 6 percent of those under the age of 60, and 20 percent of those over the age of 60. In Latin America, about 40 percent are estimated to be affected, and this may be as high as 80 percent in parts of Africa and Asia. Marginal deficiency is much more common and may occur in up to 40% of Western populations.

== Signs and symptoms ==
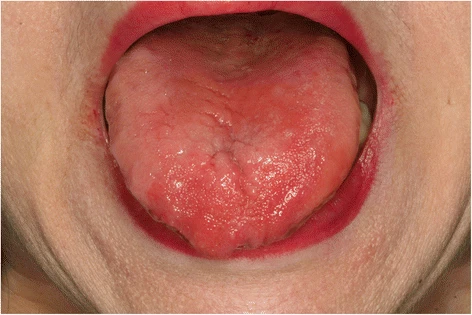
Possible oral manifestation of B_{12} deficiency: erythema and depapillation of the tongue in a patient. From Kim et al., 2016.

Vitamin B_{12} deficiency appears slowly and worsens over time, and can often be confused with other conditions. It may often go unrecognized, as one becomes used to feeling unwell.

Vitamin B_{12} deficiency can lead to anemia, neurologic, and digestive dysfunctions. A mild deficiency may not cause any discernible symptoms, but moderate deficiency can cause various symptoms, such as feeling tired, lightheadedness, rapid breathing, cold intolerance, pale skin, mouth ulcers, sore tongue, upset stomach, loss of appetite, numbness or tingling (pins and needles) of the fingers and toes, and tinnitus, and a mild cognitive changes, such as, decreased ability to think.

Severe vitamin B_{12} deficiency can damage nerve cells.

This may result in:

- sensory loss, such as loss of sensation in the feet
- changes in reflexes
- uncontrollable muscle movements or trouble walking or talking
- altered sense of proprioception
- disorientation, decreased consciousness, clumsiness, memory loss, and dementia
- mood or mental changes, such as depression or irritability, and, in severe cases, psychosis
- vision problems
- loss of smell and taste

Other possible associated symptoms of vitamin B_{12} deficiency may occur, including, bleeding gums, angular cheilitis, low-grade fevers, orthostatic hypotension, and changes in hair and skin color, including, dark circles around the eyes. Tissue deficiencies may negatively affect nerve cells, bone marrow, and the skin.

A further complication of severe deficiency is the neurological complex known as subacute combined degeneration of spinal cord. also myelosis funicularis, or funicular myelosis. This complex consists of the following symptoms:

1. Impaired perception of deep touch, pressure and vibration, loss of sense of touch, very annoying and persistent paresthesias
2. Ataxia of dorsal column type
3. Decrease or loss of deep muscle-tendon reflexes
4. Pathological reflexes – Babinski, Rossolimo and others, also severe paresis.

The presence of peripheral sensory-motor symptoms or subacute combined degeneration of the spinal cord strongly suggests the presence of a B_{12} deficiency instead of folate deficiency. Methylmalonic acid, if not properly handled by B_{12}, remains in the myelin sheath, causing fragility. Dementia and depression have been associated with this deficiency as well, possibly from the under-production of methionine because of the inability to convert homocysteine into this product. Methionine is a necessary cofactor in the production of several neurotransmitters. Each of those symptoms can occur either alone or with others.

Vitamin B_{12} is essential for the development of the brain. Its deficiency can cause neurodevelopmental problems, which can be partly reversible with early treatment. Only a small subset of dementia cases are reversible with vitamin B_{12} therapy. Tinnitus may be associated with vitamin B_{12} deficiency.

Vitamin B_{12} deficiency may accompany certain eating disorders or restrictive diets.

=== Pernicious anemia ===
Pernicious anemia is a disease caused by an autoimmune response that produces antibodies that attack the parietal cells in the stomach lining, preventing them from creating intrinsic factor needed for the absorption of vitamin B_{12}. It occurs in only about 2-3% of the population over the age of 65. It is the main and most common cause of vitamin B_{12} deficiency anemia in developed countries, and is characterized by a triad of symptoms:

1. Anemia with bone marrow promegaloblastosis (megaloblastic anemia). This is due to the inhibition of DNA synthesis (specifically purines and thymidine).
2. Gastrointestinal symptoms: alteration in bowel motility, such as mild diarrhea or constipation, and loss of bladder or bowel control. These may be due to defective DNA synthesis inhibiting replication in a site with a high turnover of cells. This may also result from the autoimmune attack on parietal cells of the stomach. There is an association with "watermelon stomach" (GAVE) and pernicious anemia.
3. Neurological symptoms: Sensory or motor deficiencies (absent reflexes, diminished vibration or soft touch sensation), subacute combined degeneration of spinal cord, or seizures. Deficiency symptoms in children include developmental delay, regression, irritability, involuntary movements, and hypotonia.

In babies, neurological symptoms can occur from malnutrition or pernicious anemia in the mother. These include poor growth, apathy, having no desire for food, and developmental regression. While most symptoms resolve with supplementation, some developmental and cognitive problems may persist.

=== Metabolic risk in offspring ===
Vitamin B_{12} is a critical micronutrient essential for supporting the increasing metabolic demands of the foetus during pregnancy. B_{12} deficiency in pregnant women is increasingly common and has been shown to be associated with major maternal health implications, including increased obesity, higher body mass index (BMI), insulin resistance, gestational diabetes, and type 2 diabetes (T2D) in later life. A study in a pregnant white non-diabetic population in England, found that for every 1% increase in BMI, there was 0.6% decrease in circulating B_{12}. Furthermore, an animal study in ewes demonstrated that a B_{12}, folate and methionine restricted diet around conception, resulted in offspring with higher adiposity, blood pressure and insulin resistance which could be accounted for by altered DNA methylation patterns.

Both vitamin B_{12} and folate are involved in the one-carbon metabolism cycle. In this cycle, vitamin B_{12} is a necessary cofactor for methionine synthase, an enzyme involved in the methylation of homocysteine to methionine. DNA methylation is involved in the functioning of genes and is an essential epigenetic control mechanism in mammals. This methylation is dependent on methyl donors such as vitamin B_{12} from the diet. Vitamin B_{12} deficiency has the potential to influence methylation patterns in DNA, besides other epigenetic modulators such as micro (RNAs), leading to the altered expression of genes. Consequently, an altered gene expression can possibly mediate impaired foetal growth and the programming of non-communicable diseases.

Vitamin B_{12} and folate status during pregnancy is associated with the increasing risk of low birth weight, preterm birth, insulin resistance and obesity in the offspring. In addition it has been associated with adverse foetal and neonatal outcomes including neural tube defects (NTDs) The mother's B_{12} status can be important in determining the later health of the child, as shown in the Pune maternal Nutrition Study, conducted in India. In this study, children born to mothers with high folate concentrations and low vitamin B_{12} concentrations were found to have higher adiposity and insulin resistance at age 6. In the same study, over 60% of pregnant women were deficient in vitamin B_{12}, which was considered to increase the risk of gestational and later diabetes in the mothers. Increased longitudinal cohort studies or randomised controlled trials are required to understand the mechanisms between vitamin B_{12} and metabolic outcomes, and to potentially offer interventions to improve maternal and offspring health.

=== Cardiometabolic disease outcomes ===
Multiple studies have explored the association between vitamin B_{12} and metabolic disease outcomes, such as obesity, insulin resistance and the development of cardiovascular disease. A long-term study where vitamin B_{12} was supplemented across a period of 10 years, led to lower levels of weight gain in overweight or obese individuals (p < 0.05).

There are several mechanisms which may explain the relationship between obesity and decreased vitamin B_{12} status. Vitamin B_{12} is a major dietary methyl donor, involved in the one-carbon cycle of metabolism and a recent genome-wide association (GWA) analysis showed that increased DNA methylation is associated with increased BMI in adults, consequently a deficiency of vitamin B_{12} may disrupt DNA methylation and increase non-communicable disease risk. Vitamin B_{12} is also a co-enzyme which converts methylmalonyl-CoA to succinyl-CoA in the one carbon cycle. If this reaction cannot occur, methylmalonyl-CoA levels elevate, inhibiting the rate-limiting enzyme of fatty acid oxidation (CPT1 – carnitine palmitoyl transferase), leading to lipogenesis and insulin resistance. Further to this, reduced vitamin B_{12} concentrations in the obese population is thought to result from repetitive short-term restrictive diets and increased vitamin B_{12} requirements secondary to increased growth and body surface area. It has also been hypothesised that low vitamin B_{12} concentrations in obese individuals are a result of wrong feeding habits, where individuals consume a diet low in micronutrient density. Finally, vitamin B_{12} is involved in the production of red blood cells, and vitamin B_{12} deficiency can result in anemia, which causes fatigue and the lack of motivation to exercise.

The investigation into the relationship between cardiovascular disease and vitamin B_{12} has been limited, and there is still controversy as to whether primary intervention with vitamin B_{12} will lower cardiovascular disease. Deficiency of vitamin B_{12} can impair the remethylation of homocysteine in the methionine cycle, and result in raised homocysteine levels. There is much evidence linking elevated homocysteine concentrations with an increased risk of cardiovascular disease, and homocysteine lowering treatments have led to improvements in cardiovascular reactivity and coagulation factors. In adults with metabolic syndrome, individuals with low levels of vitamin B_{12} had higher levels of homocysteine compared to healthy subjects. It is thus possible that vitamin B_{12} deficiency enhances the risk of developing cardiovascular disease in individuals who are obese. Alternatively, low levels of vitamin B_{12} may increase the levels of proinflammatory proteins which may induce ischaemic stroke.

It is important to screen vitamin B_{12} deficiency in obese individuals, due to its importance in energy metabolism, and relationship with homocysteine and its potential to modulate weight gain. More studies are needed to test for the causality of vitamin B_{12} and obesity using genetic markers. A few studies have also reported no deficiency of vitamin B_{12} in obese individuals. Finally, a recent literature review conducted over 19 studies, found no evidence of an inverse association between BMI and circulating vitamin B_{12}.

Previous clinical and population-based studies have indicated that vitamin B_{12} deficiency is prevalent amongst adults with type 2 diabetes. Kaya et al., conducted a study in women with polyendocrine metabolic ovarian syndrome (PMOS), and found that obese women with insulin resistance had lower vitamin B_{12} concentrations compared to those without insulin resistance. Similarly, in a study conducted in European adolescents, there was an association between high adiposity and higher insulin sensitivity with vitamin B_{12} concentrations. Individuals with a higher fat mass index and higher insulin sensitivity (high Homeostatic Model Assessment [HOMA] index) had lower plasma vitamin B_{12} concentrations. Furthermore, a recent study conducted in India reported that mean levels of vitamin B_{12} decreased with increasing levels of glucose tolerance e.g. individuals with type 2 diabetes had the lowest values of vitamin B_{12}, followed by individuals with pre-diabetes and normal glucose tolerance, respectively. However, B_{12} levels of middle aged-women with and without metabolic syndrome showed no difference in vitamin B_{12} levels between those with insulin resistance (IR) and those without. It is believed that malabsorption of vitamin B_{12} in diabetic patients, is due to individuals taking metformin therapy (an insulin sensitizer used for treating type 2 diabetes). Furthermore, obese individuals with type 2 diabetes are likely to develop gastroesophageal reflux disease, and take proton pump inhibitors, which further increased the risk of vitamin B_{12} deficiency.

A literature review conducted in 2011 over seven studies, found that there was limited evidence to show that low vitamin B_{12} status increased the risk of cardiovascular disease and diabetes. However, the review did not identify any associations between vitamin B_{12} and cardiovascular disease in the remaining four studies. Currently, no data supports vitamin B_{12} supplementation on reducing the risk of cardiovascular disease. In a dose-response meta-analysis of five prospective cohort studies, it was reported that the risk of coronary heart disease (CHD) did not change substantially with increasing dietary vitamin B_{12} intake. Of these five studies, three of the studies stated a non-significant positive association and two of the studies demonstrated an inverse association between vitamin B_{12} supplementation and coronary heart disease (only one of the studies was significant).

=== Anemia ===
Vitamin B_{12} deficiency is one of the main causes of anemia. In countries where B_{12} deficiency is common, it is generally assumed that there is a greater risk of developing anemia. However, the overall contribution of vitamin B_{12} deficiency to the global incidence of anemia may not be significant, except in elderly individuals, vegetarians, cases of malabsorption and some genetic disorders. Anemia is defined as a condition in which there are not enough red blood cells, as the tissues and organs of the body do not get enough oxygen. Megaloblastic anemia caused by vitamin B_{12} deficiency is characterized by red blood cells that are larger than normal and are unable to deliver oxygen to the body's organs. The clinical case indicates an altered synthesis of DNA, in which vitamin B_{12} is essential for the production and maturation of red blood cells in the bone marrow. Adult patients often report to medical attention symptoms related to anemia, such as feeling tired and weak, breathlessness, exercise intolerance, feeling faint, headaches, paleness, dry lips and a disturbance of taste.

Pernicious anemia is the most common cause of vitamin B_{12} deficiency anemia in adults, which results from malabsorption of vitamin B_{12} due to a lack or loss of intrinsic factor. There are relatively few studies which have assessed the impact of haematological measures in response to B_{12} supplementation. One study in 184 premature infants, reported that individuals given monthly vitamin B_{12} injections (100 μg) or taking supplements of vitamin B_{12} and folic acid (100 μg/day), had higher haemoglobin concentrations after 10–12 weeks, compared to those only taking folic acid or those taking no vitamin B_{12} injections.

=== Aging ===
In the elderly, vitamin B_{12} deficiency has been associated with the development of macular degeneration, and the risk of frailty. Macular degeneration is the leading cause of severe, irreversible vision loss in older adults. Several risk factors have been linked to macular degeneration, including family history, genetics, hypercholesterolemia, hypertension, sunlight exposure and lifestyle (smoking and diet). It has been shown that daily supplementation of vitamin B_{12}, B_{6} and folate over a period of seven years can reduce the risk of age-related macular degeneration by 34% in women with increased risk of vascular disease (n=5,204). However, another study failed to find an association between age-related macular degeneration and vitamin B_{12} status in a sample of 3,828 individuals representative of the non-institutionalized US population.

Frailty is a geriatric condition which is characterized by diminished endurance, strength, and reduced physiological function that increases an individual's risk of mortality and impairs an individual from fulfilling an independent lifestyle. Frailty is associated with an increased vulnerability to fractures, falls from heights, reduced cognitive function and more frequent hospitalisation. The worldwide prevalence of frailty within the geriatric population is 13.9%, therefore there is an urgent need to eliminate any risk factors associated with frailty. Poor vitamin B status has been shown to be associated with an increased risk of frailty. Two cross sectional studies have reported that deficiencies of vitamin B_{12} were associated with the length of hospital stay, as observed by serum vitamin B_{12} concentrations and methylmalonic acid (MMA) concentrations. Furthermore, another study of elderly women, found that certain genetic variants associated with vitamin B_{12} status (transcobalamin II) may contribute to reduced energy metabolism, consequently contributing to frailty. Given that there are limited studies assessing the relationship between vitamin B_{12} and frailty status, more longitudinal studies are needed to clarify the relationship.

=== Neurological decline ===
Severe vitamin B_{12} deficiency is associated with subacute combined degeneration of the spinal cord, which involves demyelination of the posterior and lateral columns of the spinal cord. Symptoms include memory and cognitive impairment, sensory loss, motor disturbances, personality changes, disorientation, irritability, dementia, loss of posterior column functions and disturbances in proprioception. In advanced stages of vitamin B_{12} deficiency, cases of psychosis, paranoia and severe depression have been observed, which may lead to permanent disability if left untreated. Studies have shown the rapid reversal of the neurological symptoms of vitamin B_{12} deficiency, after treatment with high-dose of vitamin B_{12} supplementation; suggesting the importance of prompt treatment in reversing neurological manifestations.

=== Cognitive decline ===
Elderly individuals are currently assessed on vitamin B_{12} status during the screening process for dementia. Studies investigating the association between vitamin B_{12} concentrations and cognitive status have produced inconclusive results. It has been shown that elevated MMA concentrations are associated with decreased cognitive decline and Alzheimer's disease. In addition, low vitamin B_{12} and folate intakes have shown associations with hyperhomocysteinemia, which is associated with cerebrovascular disease, cognitive decline and an increased risk of dementia in prospective studies.

There are limited intervention studies which have investigated the effect of supplementation of vitamin B_{12} and cognitive function. A Cochrane review, analysing two studies, found no effect of vitamin B_{12} supplementation on the cognitive scores of older adults. A recent longitudinal study in elderly individuals, found that individuals had a higher risk of brain volume loss over a 5-year period, if they had lower vitamin B_{12} and holoTC levels and higher plasma tHcy and MMA levels. More intervention studies are needed to determine the modifiable effects of vitamin B_{12} supplementation on cognition on people who are not deficient.

=== Osteoporosis ===
There has been growing interest on the effect of low serum vitamin B_{12} concentrations on bone health. Studies have found a connection between elevated plasma tHcy and an increased risk of bone fractures, but is unknown whether this is related to the increased levels of tHcy or to vitamin B_{12} levels (which are involved in homocysteine metabolism). Results from the third NHANES conducted in the United States, found that individuals had significantly lower bone mass density (BMD) and higher osteoporosis rates with each higher quartile of serum MMA (n= 737 men and 813 women). Given that poor bone mineralization has been found in individuals with pernicious anemia, and that the content of vitamin B_{12} within bone cells in culture has shown to affect the functioning of bone forming cells (osteoblasts); it is possible that vitamin B_{12} deficiency is causally related to poor bone health.

Randomized intervention trials investigating the association of vitamin B_{12} supplementation and bone health have yielded mixed results. One study conducted on osteoporotic risk patients with hyperhomocysteinemia found positive effects between supplementation of B vitamins on BMD. However, no improvement in BMD was observed in a group of healthy older people. Further, controlled trials are needed to confirm the impact and mechanisms vitamin B_{12} deficiency has on bone mineralization.

== Causes ==
Vitamin B_{12} deficiency commonly occurs due to conditions that make it hard for the body to absorb it from food, and it can also result from other causes, such as, inadequate dietary intake, and increased requirements.

=== Impaired absorption ===
- Lack of intrinsic factor: intrinsic factor is a protein produced by parietal cells in the stomach, and needed in the ileum for the absorption of vitamin B_{12}. Lack of intrinsic factor is most commonly due to an autoimmune attack on the cells that create it in the stomach, and this condition takes the name "pernicious anemia". PA may be considered as an end stage of autoimmune atrophic gastritis, a disease characterised by stomach atrophy and the presence of antibodies to parietal cells and intrinsic factor. It can also occur following the surgical removal of all or part of the stomach or small intestine; from an inherited disorder or illnesses that damage the stomach lining. Gastric surgeries that involve the removal of all or part of the stomach, such as Roux-en-Y gastric bypass or surgical removal of the small bowel results in short bowel syndrome.
- Digestive conditions: conditions that can give rise to impaired absorption of vitamin B_{12} may include achlorhydria, Crohn's disease, coeliac disease, chronic pancreatitis, blind loop syndrome, and some intestinal parasites (fish tapeworm/giardiasis). Older adults are more likely to have digestive problems that make it difficult to absorb vitamin B_{12}, without being formally low in intrinsic factor. This process does not affect the absorption of small amounts of vitamin B_{12} in supplements such as multivitamins, since it is not bound to proteins, as is the B_{12} in foods. B_{12} deficiency caused by Helicobacter pylori was positively correlated with CagA positivity and gastric inflammatory activity, rather than gastric atrophy.
- Medications: long-term use of certain medications can result in poor absorption of dietary vitamin B_{12}. These include medications to treat heartburn, and metformin to treat diabetes.
- A genetic disorder, transcobalamin II deficiency, or Imerslund–Gräsbeck syndrome can be a cause.
- Nitrous oxide exposure, and recreational use.

=== Inadequate intake ===
Vitamin B12 is an essential nutrient that the body cannot make, and is needed for life. The body normally gets enough vitamin B_{12} from the consumption of foods from animal sources, such as, red meat, shellfish, liver, fish, poultry, eggs, and dairy products. Vegans, and to a lesser degree vegetarians, are at risk of B_{12} deficiency if they do not consume either a dietary supplement or vitamin-fortified foods. Children are at a higher risk of B_{12} deficiency due to inadequate dietary intake, as they have fewer vitamin stores and a relatively larger vitamin need per calorie of food intake.

=== Increased need ===
Increased needs by the body can occur due to AIDS and hemolysis (the breakdown of red blood cells), which stimulates increased red cell production.

== Mechanism ==
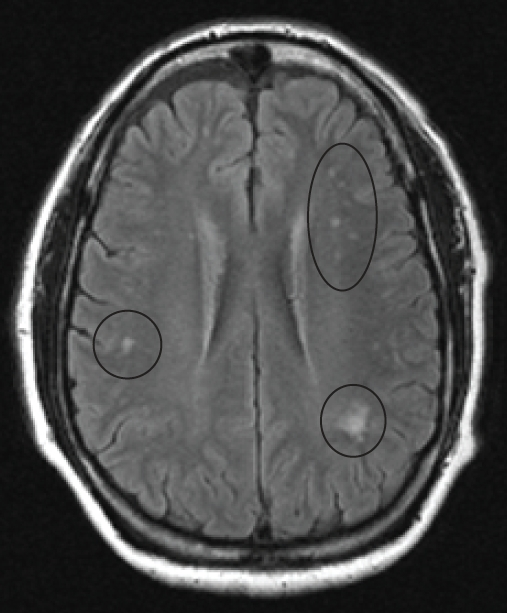
MRI image of the brain in vitamin B_{12} deficiency, axial view showing the "precontrast FLAIR image": note the abnormal lesions (circled) in the periventricular area suggesting white matter pathology.

=== Physiology ===
The total amount of vitamin B_{12} stored in the body is between two and five milligrams in adults. Approximately 50% is stored in the liver, but approximately 0.1% is lost each day, due to secretions into the gut – not all of the vitamin in the gut is reabsorbed. While bile is the main vehicle for B_{12} excretion, most of this is recycled via enterohepatic circulation. Due to the extreme efficiency of this mechanism, the liver can store three to five years worth of vitamin B_{12} under normal conditions and functioning. However, the rate at which B_{12} levels may change when dietary intake is low depends on the balance between several variables.

The human physiology of active vitamin B_{12} absorption from food is complex. When foods containing B_{12} are eaten, the vitamin is usually bound to protein and is released by proteases released by the pancreas in the small intestine. Following its release, most B_{12} is absorbed in the ileum, the last part of the small intestine, after binding to a protein known as intrinsic factor.

=== Pathophysiology ===
Vitamin B_{12} deficiency causes particular changes to the metabolism of two clinically relevant substances in humans:

1. Homocysteine (homocysteine to methionine, catalysed by methionine synthase) leading to hyperhomocysteinemia
2. Methylmalonic acid (methylmalonyl-CoA to succinyl-CoA, of which methylmalonyl-CoA is made from methylmalonic acid in a preceding reaction)

Methionine is activated to S-adenosyl methionine, which aids in purine and thymidine synthesis, myelin production, protein/neurotransmitters/fatty acid/phospholipid production and DNA methylation. 5-methyl tetrahydrofolate provides a methyl group, which is released to the reaction with homocysteine, resulting in methionine. This reaction requires cobalamin as a cofactor. The creation of 5-methyl tetrahydrofolate is an irreversible reaction. If B_{12} is absent, the forward reaction of homocysteine to methionine does not occur, homocysteine concentrations increase, and the replenishment of tetrahydrofolate stops. Because B_{12} and folate are involved in the metabolism of homocysteine, hyperhomocysteinuria is a non-specific marker of deficiency. Methylmalonic acid is used as a test of B_{12} deficiency, but has a low specificity.

=== Nervous system ===
Early changes include a spongiform state of neural tissue, along with edema of fibers and deficiency of tissue. The myelin decays, along with axial fiber. In later phases, fibric sclerosis of nervous tissues occurs. Those changes occur in dorsal parts of the spinal cord and to pyramidal tracts in lateral cords and are called subacute combined degeneration of spinal cord. Pathological changes can be noticed as well in the posterior roots of the cord and, to lesser extent, in peripheral nerves.

In the brain itself, changes are less severe: They occur as small sources of nervous fibers decay and accumulation of astrocytes, usually subcortically located, and also round hemorrhages with a torus of glial cells.

MRI of the brain may show periventricular white matter abnormalities. MRI of the spinal cord may show linear hyperintensity in the posterior portion of the cervical tract of the spinal cord, with selective involvement of the posterior columns.

== Diagnosis ==
Schematic representation of the propionate metabolic pathway. Methylmalonyl-CoA mutase requires the coenzyme adenosylcobalamin in order to convert L-methylmalonyl-CoA into succinyl-CoA. Otherwise, methylmalonic acid accumulates, which can be a marker for vitamin B_{12} deficiency, among other things.

A diagnosis of vitamin B_{12} deficiency is determined by a lower than normal levels of vitamin B_{12} in the blood, but if clinical symptoms are present alongside normal vitamin B_{12} values, further investigations may be needed. Measurement of blood methylmalonic acid (MMA), a vitamin B_{12}-associated metabolite, is a commonly used biomarker. When suspected, a diagnosis usually requires several tests. There is no gold standard assay to confirm a vitamin B_{12} deficiency.

An isolated serum vitamin B_{12} levels can be falsely high or low and data for sensitivity and specificity vary widely. Standard vitamin B_{12} blood test measure both active and inactive vitamin B_{12}, in which, most of it is not used by the body.

Blood tests may show low levels of vitamin B_{12}, elevated levels of methylmalonic acid or homocysteine, and a routine complete blood counts may shows anemia with an elevated mean cell volume.

Deficiency can develop without anemia or within normal vitamin B_{12} levels, leading to a methylmalonic acid or homocysteine assay. In some cases, a peripheral blood smear may be used; which may allow to show macrocytes and hypersegmented polymorphonuclear leukocytes. Neuropsychiatric symptoms can precede hematological signs and are often the presenting manifestation of B_{12} deficiency. Anemia can be prevented or masked by folic acid in which activate tetrahydrofolate (THF) needed for DNA synthesis.

The presence of antibodies to gastric parietal cells and intrinsic factor may indicate pernicious anemia.

However, elevated methylmalonic acid levels may also be related to metabolic disorders such as methylmalonic acidemia. If elevated methylmalonic acid levels are further accompanied by elevated malonic acid levels, this may be indicative of combined malonic and methylmalonic aciduria (CMAMMA).

If nervous system damage is present and blood testing is inconclusive, a lumbar puncture to measure cerebrospinal fluid B-_{12} levels may be done. On bone marrow aspiration or biopsy, megaloblasts are seen.

The Schilling test was a radio-isotope method, now outdated, of testing for low vitamin B_{12}.

=== Serum levels ===
A diagnosis of vitamin B_{12} deficiency may determined by blood levels lower than 200 or 250 picograms per ml (148 or 185 picomoles per liter). Some people can have symptoms with their normal levels of the vitamin, or may have low levels despite having no significant symptoms. Normal blood levels are considered to be at least above 300 pg/mL in adults. Some researchers have suggested that current standards for vitamin B_{12} levels are too low.

== Treatment ==
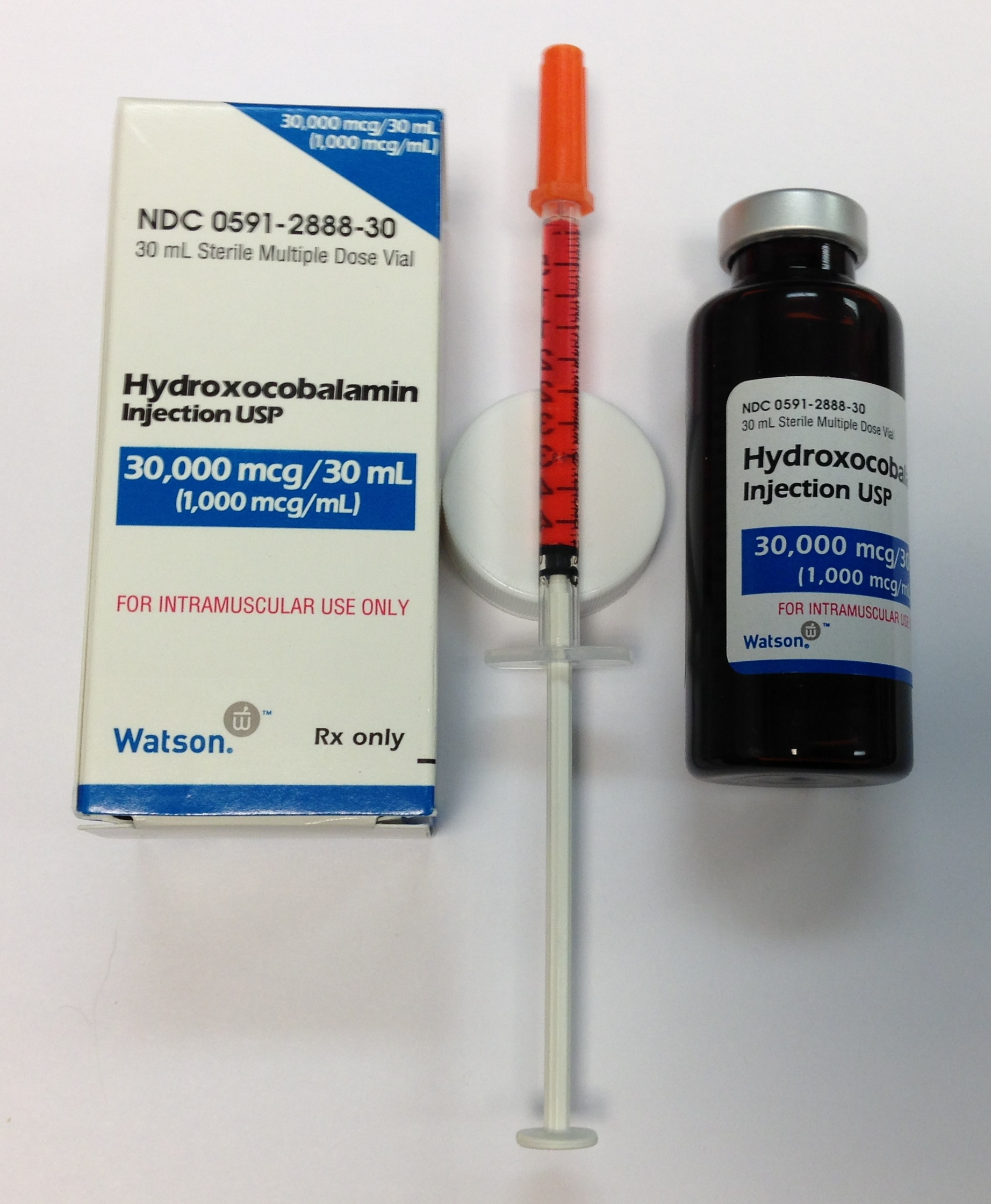
Hydroxocobalamin injection is a clear red liquid solution.

Treatment should take into account the cause and severity of the condition. Treatment is done by vitamin B_{12} supplementation, either by mouth or by injection, initially in high daily doses, followed by less frequent lower doses, as the condition improves. If no reversible cause is found, or when found it cannot be eliminated, lifelong vitamin B_{12} administration is usually recommended. More serious vitamin B_{12} deficiency requires injections initially. A 2019 study suggested that oral B_{12} is inferior to B_{12} injections in severe cases, as "there is no proof in large prospective, double-blind studies that oral supplementation is as effective in reducing symptoms associated with vitamin B_{12} deficiency as parenteral treatment."

There is risk that folic acid administered to those with untreated B_{12} deficiency may mask anemia without solving the issue at hand in which, if left untreated, can cause lasting serious side effects that affect the nervous system and brain.

Measuring vitamin B_{12} values during or after treatment, in order to measure the effectiveness of treatment, is useless.

== Epidemiology ==
Vitamin B_{12} deficiency is common and occurs worldwide. In the US and UK, around 6 percent of the general population have the deficiency; among the elderly, around 20 percent are deficient. In under-developed countries, the rates are even higher: across Latin America 40 percent are deficient; in some parts of Africa, 70 percent; and in some parts of India, 70 to 80 percent.

According to the World Health Organization (WHO), vitamin B_{12} deficiency may be considered a global public health problem affecting millions of individuals. However, the incidence and prevalence of vitamin B_{12} deficiency worldwide is unknown due to the limited population-based data available

Developed countries such as the United States, Germany and the United Kingdom have relatively constant mean vitamin B_{12} concentrations. The data from the National Health and Nutrition Examination Survey (NHANES) reported the prevalence of serum vitamin B_{12} concentrations in the United States population between 1999 and 2002. Serum vitamin B_{12} concentrations of < 148 pmol/L was present in < 1% of children and adolescents. In adults aged 20–39 years, concentrations were below this cut-off in ≤ 3% of individuals. In the elderly (70 years and older), ≈ 6% of persons had a vitamin B_{12} concentration below the cut-off.

Furthermore, ≈ 14–16% of adults and > 20% of elderly individuals showed evidence of marginal vitamin B_{12} depletion (serum vitamin B_{12}: 148–221 pmol/L). In the United Kingdom, a National Diet and Nutrition Survey (NDNS) was conducted in adults aged between 19 and 64 years in 2000–2001 and in elderly individuals (≥ 65 years) in 1994–95. Six percent of men (n = 632) and 10% of women (n = 667) had low serum vitamin B_{12} concentrations, defined as < 150 pmol/L. In a subgroup of women of reproductive age (19 to 49 years), 11% had low serum B_{12} concentrations < 150 pmol/L (n = 476). The prevalence of vitamin B_{12} deficiency increased substantially in the elderly, where 31% of the elderly had vitamin B_{12} levels below 130 pmol/L. In the most recent NDNS survey conducted between 2008 and 2011, serum vitamin B_{12} was measured in 549 adults. The mean serum vitamin B_{12} concentration for men (19–64 years) was 308 pmol/L, of which 0.9% of men had low serum B_{12} concentrations < 150 pmol/L. In women aged between 19 and 64 years, the mean serum vitamin B_{12} concentration was slightly lower than men (298 pmol/L), with 3.3% having low vitamin B_{12} concentrations < 150 pmol/L. In Germany, a national survey in 1998 was conducted in 1,266 women of childbearing age. Approximately, 14.7% of these women had mean serum vitamin B_{12} concentrations of < 148 pmol/L.

Few studies have reported vitamin B_{12} status on a national level in non-Western countries. Of these reported studies, vitamin B_{12} deficiency was prevalent among school-aged children in Venezuela (11.4%), children aged 1–6 years in Mexico (7.7%), women of reproductive age in Vietnam (11.7%), pregnant women in Venezuela (61.34%) and in the elderly population (> 65 years) in New Zealand (12%). Currently, there are no nationally representative surveys for any African or South Asian countries. However, the very few surveys which have investigated vitamin B_{12} deficiency in these countries have been based on local or district level data. These surveys have reported a high prevalence of vitamin B_{12} deficiency (< 150 pmol/L), among 36% of breastfed and 9% of non-breastfed children (n = 2482) in New Delhi and 47% of adults (n = 204) in Pune, Maharashtra, India. Furthermore, in Kenya a local district survey in Embu (n = 512) revealed that 40% of school-aged children in Kenya had vitamin B_{12} deficiency.

Worldwide prevalence of vitamin B_{12} deficiency (serum/plasma B_{12} < 148 or 150 pmol/L)
Group	Number of studies	Number of participants	Vitamin B_{12} deficiency (%)
Children (< 1y – 18 years)	14	22,331	12.5
Pregnant women	11	11,381	27.5
Non-pregnant women	16	18,520	16
All adults (under 60 years)	18	81.438	6
Elderly (60+ years)	25	30,449	19

Derived from Table 2 available on

== History ==
Between 1849 and 1887, Thomas Addison described a case of pernicious anemia, William Osler and William Gardner first described a case of neuropathy, Hayem described large red cells in the peripheral blood in this condition, which he called "giant blood corpuscles" (now called macrocytes), Paul Ehrlich identified megaloblasts in the bone marrow, and Ludwig Lichtheim described a case of myelopathy. During the 1920s, George Whipple discovered that ingesting large amounts of liver seemed to most rapidly cure the anemia of blood loss in dogs, and hypothesized that eating liver might treat pernicious anemia. Edwin Cohn prepared a liver extract that was 50 to 100 times more potent in treating pernicious anemia than the natural liver products. William Castle demonstrated that gastric juice contained an "intrinsic factor" which when combined with meat ingestion resulted in absorption of the vitamin in this condition. In 1934, George Whipple shared the 1934 Nobel Prize in Physiology or Medicine with William P. Murphy and George Minot for discovery of an effective treatment for pernicious anemia using liver concentrate, later found to contain a large amount of vitamin B_{12}.

== Other animals ==
Ruminants, such as cattle and sheep, absorb B_{12} synthesized by their gut bacteria. Sufficient amounts of cobalt and copper need to be consumed for this B_{12} synthesis to occur.

In the early 20th century, during the development for farming of the North Island Volcanic Plateau of New Zealand, cattle had what was termed "bush sickness". It was discovered in 1934 that the volcanic soils lacked the cobalt salts essential for synthesis of vitamin B_{12} by their gut bacteria. The "coast disease" of sheep in the coastal sand dunes of South Australia in the 1930s was found to originate in nutritional deficiencies of the trace elements, cobalt and copper. The cobalt deficiency was overcome by the development of "cobalt bullets", dense pellets of cobalt oxide mixed with clay given orally, which then was retained in the animal's rumen.
