= Amnionless =

Protein-coding gene in the species Homo sapiens

AMN

Identifiers
- Aliases: AMN, PRO1028, amnionless, Amnionless, amnion associated transmembrane protein, IGS2
- External IDs: OMIM: 605799; MGI: 1934943; HomoloGene: 12804; GeneCards: AMN; OMA:AMN - orthologs

Gene location (Human)
Chr.	Chromosome 14 (human)
Band	14q32.32	Start	102,922,663 bp
Band	14q32.32	End	102,933,596 bp

Gene location (Mouse)
Chr.	Chromosome 12 (mouse)
Band	12 F1|12 60.94 cM	Start	111,237,529 bp
Band	12 F1|12 60.94 cM	End	111,242,860 bp
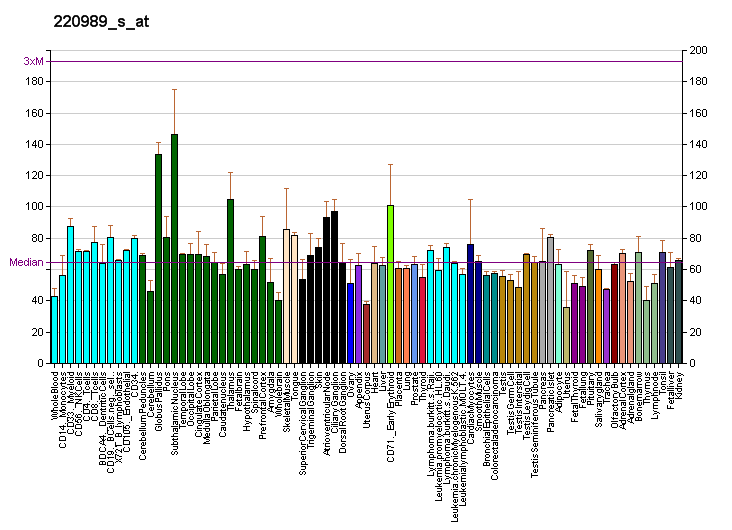
RNA expression pattern
Bgee	Human / Mouse (ortholog); Top expressed in: mucosa of transverse colon; jejunal mucosa; duodenum; right lobe of liver; vena cava; human kidney; mucosa of sigmoid colon; body of tongue; pancreatic ductal cell; right uterine tube / Top expressed in: intestinal villus; yolk sac; right kidney; ileum; epithelium of small intestine; proximal tubule; human kidney; jejunum; migratory enteric neural crest cell; primitive streak; More reference expression data
BioGPS	More reference expression data
Gene ontology
Molecular function	signaling receptor binding
Cellular component	extracellular exosome; endosome membrane; membrane; integral component of membrane; apical part of cell; clathrin-coated pit; endosome; apical plasma membrane; plasma membrane; extracellular space; endocytic vesicle; brush border membrane; protein-containing complex
Biological process	cobalamin metabolic process; multicellular organism development; protein localization; receptor-mediated endocytosis; cobalamin transport; Golgi to plasma membrane protein transport; excretion; protein transport; high-density lipoprotein particle clearance; transport
Sources:Amigo / QuickGO
Orthologs
Species	Human	Mouse
Entrez	81693	93835
Ensembl	ENSG00000166126	ENSMUSG00000021278
UniProt	Q9BXJ7	Q99JB7
RefSeq (mRNA)	NM_030943	NM_033603
RefSeq (protein)	NP_112205	NP_291081
Location (UCSC)	Chr 14: 102.92 – 102.93 Mb	Chr 12: 111.24 – 111.24 Mb
PubMed search
- Wikidata
View/Edit Human	View/Edit Mouse

Amnionless is a protein that in humans is encoded by the AMN gene.

== Function ==
A complex of amnionless and cubilin forms the cubam receptor.

The protein encoded by this gene is a type I transmembrane protein. It is thought to modulate bone morphogenetic protein (BMP) receptor function by serving as an accessory or coreceptor, and thus facilitates or hinders BMP binding. It is known that the mouse AMN gene is expressed in the extraembryonic visceral endoderm layer during gastrulation, but it is found to be mutated in amnionless mouse. The encoded protein has sequence similarity to short gastrulation (Sog) and procollagen IIA proteins in Drosophila.

== Clinical significance ==
Mutations of the AMN gene may cause Imerslund–Gräsbeck syndrome.
