= Cubam =

Multi-ligand receptor

amnionless homolog (mouse)

Identifiers
- Symbol: AMN
- Alt. symbols: PRO1028
- NCBI gene: 81693
- HGNC: 14604
- OMIM: 605799
- RefSeq: NM_030943
- UniProt: Q9BXJ7

Other data
- Locus: Chr. 14 q32.32
Search for
- Structures: Swiss-model
- Domains: InterPro

cubilin (intrinsic factor-cobalamin receptor)

Identifiers
- Symbol: CUBN
- Alt. symbols: MGA1
- NCBI gene: 8029
- HGNC: 2548
- OMIM: 602997
- RefSeq: NM_001081
- UniProt: O60494

Other data
- Locus: Chr. 10 p12
Search for
- Structures: Swiss-model
- Domains: InterPro

Cubam is the term used to refer to a multi-ligand receptor located in the terminal ileum, specializing in absorption of vitamin B12. Cubam is essentially composed of amnionless (AMN), and cubilin. Cubilin is essential as a cell receptor recognizing the "vitamin B12-intrinsic factor" complex, whereas amnionless is more involved in the receptor mediated endocytosis of the complex.

== Clinical significance ==
Vitamin B12 is an essential water-soluble vitamin, the absorption of which relies on a functional secretion of salivary haptocorrin, functional secretion of gastric intrinsic factor, functional cleavage of the haptocorrin via pancreatic protease, and a functional absorption via the Cubam at terminal ileum. As expected, a defect at any point of the aforementioned list, can cause malabsorption of vitamin B12, and subsequent macrocytic anemia. The most common cause of Vitamin B12 deficiency is deficiency of the intrinsic factor (IF) usually due to atrophic gastritis, which reduces the number of parietal cells secreting intrinsic factor. This can lead to pernicious anemia. However, a rare abnormality of AMN can also cause vitamin B12 anemia; this condition is referred to as Imerslund-Gräsbeck syndrome (IGS). Autosomal recessive mutations in both components of Cubam (AMN and cubilin) are responsible for Imerslund-Gräsbeck syndrome, which manifests as macrocytic, megaloblastic anemia.

Severe vitamin B12 deficiency is most commonly caused by an autoimmune mediated deficiency in intrinsic factor. Rarely, a mutation in the gene CUBN (encoding cubilin) or AMN (encoding amnionless) causes an autosomal recessive form of vitamin B12 deficiency, known as the Imerslund-Gräsbeck syndrome. Cubilin and amnionless also play a role in renal tubular function. Cubilin is essential for embryonic development in rodents, but appears not to be essential for normal human embryonic development.
