= Cubilin =

Mammalian protein found in humans

CUBN
Available structures
PDB	Ortholog search: PDBe RCSB
PDB	List of PDB id codes 3KQ4

Identifiers
- Aliases: CUBN, IFCR, MGA1, gp280, cubilin, IGS, IGS1
- External IDs: OMIM: 602997; MGI: 1931256; HomoloGene: 37434; GeneCards: CUBN; OMA:CUBN - orthologs

Gene location (Human)
Chr.	Chromosome 10 (human)
Band	10p13	Start	16,823,966 bp
Band	10p13	End	17,129,811 bp

Gene location (Mouse)
Chr.	Chromosome 2 (mouse)
Band	2 A1|2 9.86 cM	Start	13,281,149 bp
Band	2 A1|2 9.86 cM	End	13,496,624 bp
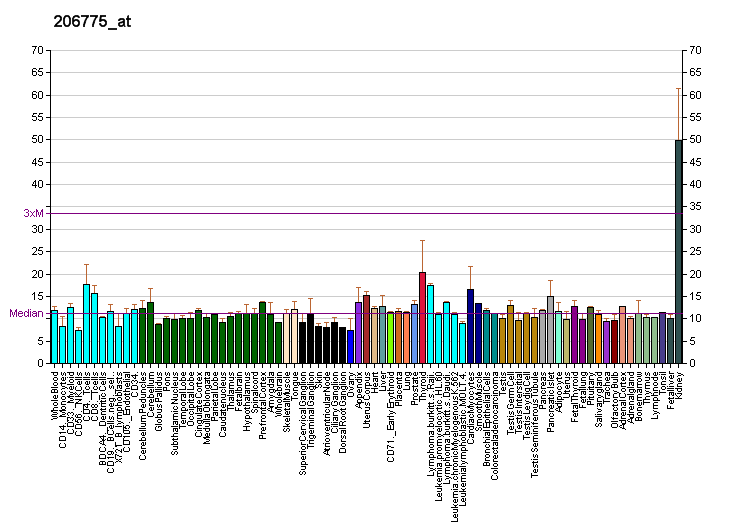

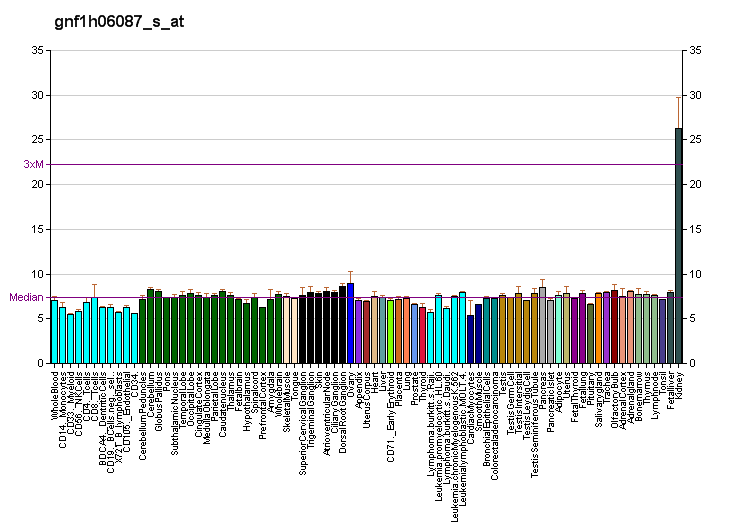
RNA expression pattern
Bgee	Human / Mouse (ortholog); Top expressed in: kidney tubule; glomerulus; renal medulla; metanephric glomerulus; sperm; oocyte; right uterine tube; human kidney; gonad; secondary oocyte / Top expressed in: primitive streak; yolk sac; ileum; human kidney; epithelium of small intestine; intestinal villus; jejunum; epithelium of lens; Ileal epithelium; right kidney; More reference expression data
BioGPS	More reference expression data
Gene ontology
Molecular function	calcium ion binding; protein homodimerization activity; protein binding; transporter activity; cobalamin binding; metal ion binding; channel regulator activity; hemoglobin binding; signaling receptor activity; cargo receptor activity
Cellular component	brush border; extrinsic component of external side of plasma membrane; endoplasmic reticulum; clathrin-coated pit; lysosomal membrane; cytoplasm; Golgi apparatus; endosome; apical part of cell; lysosome; lysosomal lumen; membrane; cytosol; extracellular exosome; endocytic vesicle; endosome membrane; plasma membrane; apical plasma membrane; brush border membrane; Golgi-associated vesicle; ionotropic glutamate receptor complex; coated vesicle; endocytic vesicle membrane; neuron projection membrane; synapse
Biological process	tissue homeostasis; cobalamin transport; lipid metabolism; protein transport; cholesterol metabolic process; vitamin D metabolic process; cobalamin metabolic process; steroid metabolic process; endocytosis; lipoprotein transport; receptor-mediated endocytosis; high-density lipoprotein particle clearance; transport; in utero embryonic development; thigmotaxis; hyperosmotic response; response to nutrient; adult locomotory behavior; response to bacterium; endocytic hemoglobin import into cell; regulation of locomotion; cobalamin catabolic process; positive regulation of synaptic transmission, glutamatergic; protein homotrimerization
Sources:Amigo / QuickGO
Orthologs
Species	Human	Mouse
Entrez	8029	65969
Ensembl	ENSG00000107611	ENSMUSG00000026726
UniProt	O60494	Q9JLB4
RefSeq (mRNA)	NM_001081	NM_001081084
RefSeq (protein)	NP_001072	NP_001074553
Location (UCSC)	Chr 10: 16.82 – 17.13 Mb	Chr 2: 13.28 – 13.5 Mb
PubMed search
- Wikidata
View/Edit Human	View/Edit Mouse

Cubilin is a protein that in humans is encoded by the CUBN gene. It is present upon the luminal surface of enterocytes of the ileum where it facilitates absorption of vitamin B12 by acting as a receptor for IF-cobalamin (intrinsic factor - vitamin B12) complexes, enabling endocytosis of complexes by means of amnionless (AMN).

== Biochemistry ==
Cubilinis essentially only present in the small intestine and kidneys.

A complex of amnionless and cubilin forms the cubam receptor.

== Clinical significance ==
Mutations in CUBN may play a role in autosomal recessive megaloblastic anemia.

Cubilin is a potential diagnostic and prognostic cancer biomarker for kidney cancer. Based on patient survival data, high levels of cubilin in tumor cells is a favourable prognostic biomarker in renal cell carcinoma.
