= CLIC =

CLIC or Clic can refer to:

== Science and Technology ==
- Chloride intracellular channel (a type of chloride channel, consists of six conserved proteins in humans (CLIC1, CLIC2, CLIC3, CLIC4, CLIC5, CLIC6)
- Clathrin-independent carrier (a subtype of endocytic membrane)
- Compact Linear Collider, a proposed particle accelerator at CERN

== Airlines ==
- Clic Air, formerly branded EasyFly, is a Colombian regional airline
- Clickair, former airline of Spain, merged with Vueling

== Music ==
- Clic (album) a 1974 album by Italian experimental musician Franco Battiatio

== Other ==
- S4C Clic, a video on demand service from Welsh broadcaster S4C
- CLIC Sargent (now Young Lives vs Cancer), a cancer charity in the United Kingdom
- Cluster LInux pour le Calcul, is a special version of Mandrakelinux for computer clusters
- CLiC (Colectivo de Livecoders), a livecoding collective from Argentina
- Community Leadership Independence Coalition, a party formed by Peter Lewis in the 2002 South Australian legislative election
- Company Level Intelligence Cell, a group of infantry Marines who form a small intelligence unit
- Cooperating Libraries in Consortium, a non-profit consortium of the libraries of eight private colleges and universities in Minneapolis–Saint Paul
- Programs organized by the Cumbria County Council:
  - Cumbria Learning and Improvement Collaborative, an information resource for health and social workers
  - Cumbria Libraries Interactive Catalogue, a county-wide public library catalogue system
