= Calcium-dependent chloride channel =

Group of transport proteins

TMEM16
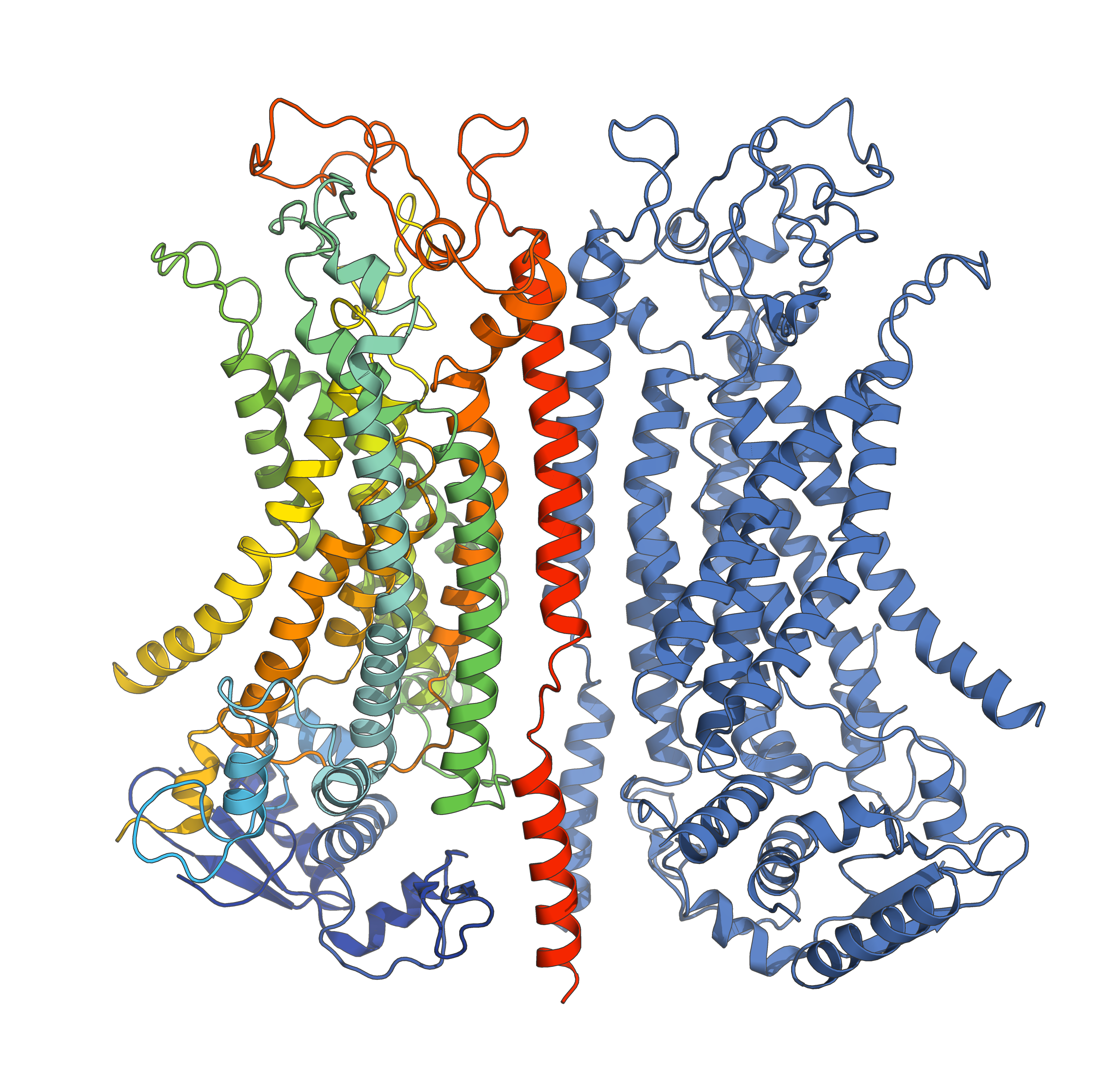
- Cartoon representation of a mTMEM16A chloride channel based on a cryoelectron microscopy reconstruction.

Identifiers
- Symbol: Apoctamin
- Pfam: PF04547
- InterPro: IPR032394
- TCDB: 1.A.17
- OPM superfamily: 369
- Membranome: 219
Available protein structures:
- PDB: IPR032394 PF04547 (ECOD; PDBsum)
- AlphaFold: IPR032394; PF04547

The Calcium-Dependent Chloride Channel (Ca-ClC) proteins (or calcium-activated chloride channels (CaCCs), are heterogeneous groups of ligand-gated ion channels for chloride that have been identified in many epithelial and endothelial cell types as well as in smooth muscle cells. They include proteins from several structurally different families: chloride channel accessory (CLCA), bestrophin (BEST), and calcium-dependent chloride channel anoctamin (ANO or TMEM16) channels ANO1 is highly expressed in human gastrointestinal interstitial cells of Cajal, which are proteins which serve as intestinal pacemakers for peristalsis. In addition to their role as chloride channels some CLCA proteins function as adhesion molecules and may also have roles as tumour suppressors. These eukaryotic proteins are "required for normal electrolyte and fluid secretion, olfactory perception, and neuronal and smooth muscle excitability" in animals. Members of the Ca-CIC family are generally 600 to 1000 amino acyl residues (aas) in length and exhibit 7 to 10 transmembrane segments (TMSs).

== Function ==
Tmc1 and Tmc2 (TC#s 1.A.17.4.6 and 1.A.17.4.1, respectively) may play a role in hearing and are required for normal function of cochlear hair cells, possibly as Ca^{2+} channels or Ca^{2+} channel subunits (see also family TC# 1.A.82). Mice lacking both channels lack hair cell mechanosensory potentials. There are 8 members of this family in humans, 1 in Drosophila and 2 in C. elegans. One of the latter two is expressed in mechanoreceptors. Tmc1 is a sodium-sensitive cation channel required for salt (Na^{+}) chemosensation in C. elegans "where it is required for salt-evoked neuronal activity and behavioural avoidance of high concentrations of NaCl".

TMEM16A is over-expressed in several tumor types. The role of TMEM16A in gliomas and the potential underlying mechanisms were analyzed by Liu et al. 2014. Knockdown of TMEM16A suppressed cell proliferation, migration and invasion.

The reactions believed to be catalyzed by channels of the Ca-ClC family are:

Cl^{−} (out) ⇌ Cl^{−} (in)

and

Cations (e.g., Ca^{2+}) (out) ⇌ Cations (e.g., Ca^{2+}) (in)

== In humans ==
CaCCs that are known to occur in humans include:

- Accessories: CLCA1, CLCA2, CLCA3, and CLCA4
- Anoctamins: (Note: The anoctamins are only expressed in eukaryotes, with 10 members in vertebrates. Although all anoctamins are calcium-activated, not all members of this family are ion channels like ANO1; some are phospholipid scramblases. ANO1 was the first anoctamin discovered, with three research groups independently identifying it in 2008. A single protein homologue to the vertebrate anoctamins has been found in fungi and yeast, Aspergillus fumigatus and Saccharomyces cerevisiae, respsectively.) ANO1 and ANO2 (potentially others)
- Bestrophins: BEST1, BEST2, BEST3, and BEST4

== See also ==
- Voltage-gated ion channel
- Ion channel
