= Tweety family member 2 =

Protein-coding gene in the species Homo sapiens

TTYH2

Identifiers
- Aliases: TTYH2, C17orf29, Tweety family member 2
- External IDs: OMIM: 608855; MGI: 2157091; HomoloGene: 41882; GeneCards: TTYH2; OMA:TTYH2 - orthologs

Gene location (Human)
Chr.	Chromosome 17 (human)
Band	17q25.1	Start	74,213,571 bp
Band	17q25.1	End	74,262,020 bp

Gene location (Mouse)
Chr.	Chromosome 11 (mouse)
Band	11|11 E2	Start	114,566,257 bp
Band	11|11 E2	End	114,611,803 bp
RNA expression pattern
Bgee	Human / Mouse (ortholog); Top expressed in: inferior ganglion of vagus nerve; external globus pallidus; corpus callosum; subthalamic nucleus; pars reticulata; Medulla Oblongata; ventral tegmental area; pars compacta; Pons; superior vestibular nucleus / Top expressed in: lumbar subsegment of spinal cord; left lobe of liver; internal carotid artery; external carotid artery; blastocyst; intestinal villus; motor neuron; duodenum; jejunum; pineal gland; More reference expression data
BioGPS	n/a
Gene ontology
Molecular function	protein binding; chloride channel activity; intracellular calcium activated chloride channel activity; volume-sensitive chloride channel activity
Cellular component	integral component of membrane; plasma membrane; membrane; chloride channel complex
Biological process	chloride transport; chloride transmembrane transport; ion transport; ion transmembrane transport
Sources:Amigo / QuickGO
Orthologs
Species	Human	Mouse
Entrez	94015	117160
Ensembl	ENSG00000141540	ENSMUSG00000034714
UniProt	Q9BSA4	Q3TH73
RefSeq (mRNA)	NM_032646; NM_052869; NM_001330453	NM_053273
RefSeq (protein)	NP_001317382; NP_116035; NP_443101	NP_444503
Location (UCSC)	Chr 17: 74.21 – 74.26 Mb	Chr 11: 114.57 – 114.61 Mb
PubMed search
- Wikidata
View/Edit Human	View/Edit Mouse

Tweety family member 2 is a protein that in humans is encoded by the TTYH2 gene. Members of this family function as chloride channels. The encoded protein functions as a calcium^{2+}-activated large conductance chloride(-) channel, and may play a role in kidney tumorigenesis. Two transcript variants encoding distinct isoforms have been identified for this gene.

== See also ==
- Tweety family member 3 (TTYH3)
