= Carbachol =

Chemical compound

Clinical data
- Trade names: Miostat, others
- Other names: Carbamylcholine
- AHFS/Drugs.com: Monograph
- License data: US DailyMed: Carbachol
- Pregnancy category: AU: B2
- Routes of administration: By mouth, ophthalmic, injection
- ATC code: N07AB01 (WHO) S01EB02 (WHO) QA03AB92 (WHO)

Legal status
- Legal status: In general: ℞ (Prescription only)

Pharmacokinetic data
- Bioavailability: Low

Identifiers
- IUPAC name: 2-[(Aminocarbonyl)oxy]-N,N,N-trimethylethanaminium chloride
- CAS Number: 51-83-2
- PubChem CID: 5831
- IUPHAR/BPS: 298
- DrugBank: DB00411
- ChemSpider: 5626
- UNII: 8Y164V895Y
- KEGG: D00524
- ChEBI: CHEBI:3385
- ChEMBL: ChEMBL14
- PDB ligand: CCE (PDBe, RCSB PDB)
- CompTox Dashboard (EPA): DTXSID9022730
- ECHA InfoCard: 100.000.117

Chemical and physical data
- Formula: C_{6}H_{15}ClN_{2}O_{2}
- Molar mass: 182.65 g·mol^{−1}
- 3D model (JSmol): Interactive image
- SMILES: [Cl-].O=C(OCC[N+](C)(C)C)N
- InChI: InChI=1S/C6H14N2O2.ClH/c1-8(2,3)4-5-10-6(7)9;/h4-5H2,1-3H3,(H-,7,9);1H; Key:AIXAANGOTKPUOY-UHFFFAOYSA-N

Carbachol, also known as carbamylcholine and sold under the brand name Miostat among others, is a cholinomimetic drug that binds and activates acetylcholine receptors. Thus it is classified as a cholinergic agonist. It is primarily used for various ophthalmic purposes, such as for treating glaucoma, or for use during ophthalmic surgery. It is generally administered as an ophthalmic solution (i.e., eye drops).

Carbachol produces effects comparable to those of sarin if a massive overdose is administered (as may occur following industrial and shipping accidents) and therefore it is classified as an extremely hazardous substance in the United States as defined in Section 302 of the U.S. Emergency Planning and Community Right-to-Know Act (42 U.S.C. 11002), and is subject to strict reporting requirements by facilities which produce, store, or use it in significant quantities.

It is on the World Health Organization's List of Essential Medicines.

== Medical uses ==
Carbachol is primarily used in the treatment of glaucoma, but it is also used during ophthalmic surgery. Carbachol eyedrops are used to decrease the pressure in the eye for people with glaucoma. It is sometimes used to constrict the pupils during cataract surgery.

Topical ocular administration is used to decrease intraocular pressure in people with primary open-angle glaucoma. Intraocular administration is used to produce miosis after lens implantation during cataract surgery. Carbachol can also be used to stimulate bladder emptying to treat the condition of underactive bladder.

In most countries, carbachol is only available by prescription. Outside the United States, it is also indicated for urinary retention as an oral (2 mg) tablet.

== Contraindications ==
Use of carbachol, as well as all other muscarinic receptor agonists, is contraindicated in patients with asthma, coronary insufficiency, gastroduodenal ulcers, and incontinence. The parasympathomimetic action of this drug will exacerbate the symptoms of these disorders.

== Overdose ==
The effects of a systemic overdose will probably be similar to the effects of a nerve agent (they both act on the cholinergic system, increasing cholinergic transmission), but its toxicity is much weaker and it is easier to antagonize in overdose. When administered ocularly there is little risk of such effects, since the doses are much smaller (see topical versus systemic administration).

== Pharmacology ==
Carbachol is not well absorbed in the gastrointestinal tract and does not cross the blood–brain barrier. It is usually administered topical ocular or through intraocular injection. Carbachol is not easily metabolized by cholinesterase, it has a 2 to 5 minute onset of action and its duration of action is 4 to 8 hours with topical administration and 24 hours for intraocular administration. Since carbachol is poorly absorbed through topical administration, benzalkonium chloride is mixed in to promote absorption.

Carbachol is a parasympathomimetic that stimulates both muscarinic and nicotinic receptors. In topical ocular and intraocular administration its principal effects are miosis and increased aqueous humour outflow.

In the cat and rat, carbachol is well known for its ability to induce rapid eye movement (REM) sleep when microinjected into the pontine reticular formation. Carbachol elicits this REM sleep-like state via activation of postsynaptic muscarinic cholinergic receptors (mAChRs).

A recent review indicates that carbachol is a strong promoter of ICC activity, which is mediated through the calcium-activated chloride channel, anoctamin 1.

== Chemistry ==
Carbachol is a choline carbamate and a positively charged quaternary ammonium compound.

=== Synthesis ===
Carbachol may be prepared in a 2 step process beginning with the reaction of 2-chloroethanol with urea to form a 2-chloroethyl-carbamate, which is then quaternised by a reaction with trimethylamine.
