= Autosomal recessive bestrophinopathy =

- Specialty: Medical genetics
- Symptoms: Ocular
- Complications: Vision impairment
- Usual onset: Childhood
- Duration: Lifelong
- Causes: Genetic mutation
- Prevention: None
- Prognosis: Medium
- Frequency: rare, about 20 cases have been described in medical literature
- Deaths: -

Autosomal recessive bestrophinopathy is a rare genetic disorder characterized by central vision loss, retinopathy, absence of an electrooculogram light rise, and decreased electroretinogram. Other findings include dispersed punctate flecks, macular neurosensory retina fluid build-up, hyperopia, macular thinning, and (less commonly) angle-closure glaucoma.

It is caused by hereditary autosomal recessive mutations in the BEST1 gene, located in chromosome 11, and it has been described in less than 20 individuals from 10 families worldwide. Autosomal recessive bestrophinopathy (ARB) has also been reported in Sri Lanka, in what was described as the country's first genetically confirmed cohort.
