= Bestrophin-2 =

Protein-coding gene in the species Homo sapiens

BEST2

Identifiers
- Aliases: BEST2, VMD2L1, bestrophin 2
- External IDs: OMIM: 607335; MGI: 2387588; GeneCards: BEST2

Gene location (Human)
Chr.	Chromosome 19 (human)
Band	19p13.13	Start	12,751,702 bp
Band	19p13.13	End	12,758,458 bp

Gene location (Mouse)
Chr.	Chromosome 8 (mouse)
Band	8|8 C3	Start	85,733,831 bp
Band	8|8 C3	End	85,741,160 bp
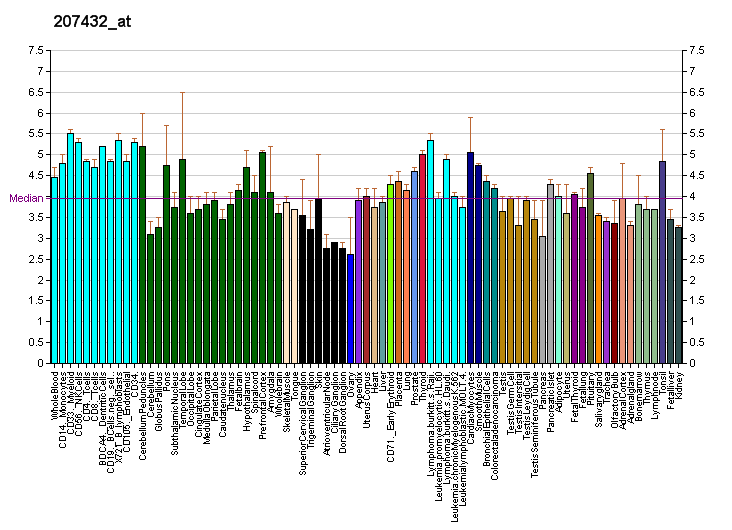
RNA expression pattern
Bgee	Human / Mouse (ortholog); Top expressed in: mucosa of transverse colon; mucosa of sigmoid colon; rectum; skin of abdomen; mucosa of ileum; skin of leg; skin of thigh; epithelium of colon; putamen; amygdala / Top expressed in: ciliary body; left colon; iris; primary oocyte; embryo; secondary oocyte; zygote; embryo; lip; lens; More reference expression data
BioGPS	More reference expression data
Gene ontology
Molecular function	chloride channel activity; molecular function
Cellular component	integral component of membrane; plasma membrane; cilium; membrane; chloride channel complex
Biological process	sensory perception of smell; membrane depolarization; chloride transport; ion transport; chloride transmembrane transport; biological process
Sources:Amigo / QuickGO
Orthologs
Databases	NCBI: entry; OMA: entry
Species	Human	Mouse
Entrez	54831	212989
Ensembl	ENSG00000039987	ENSMUSG00000052819
UniProt	Q8NFU1	Q8BGM5
RefSeq (mRNA)	NM_017682	NM_001130194
RefSeq (protein)	NP_060152	NP_001123666
Location (UCSC)	Chr 19: 12.75 – 12.76 Mb	Chr 8: 85.73 – 85.74 Mb
PubMed search
- Wikidata
View/Edit Human	View/Edit Mouse

Bestrophin-2 is a protein that in humans is encoded by the BEST2 gene.

== Function ==
This gene is a member of the bestrophin gene family of anion channels. Bestrophin genes share a similar gene structure with highly conserved exon-intron boundaries, but with distinct 3' ends. Bestrophins are transmembrane proteins that contain a homologous region rich in aromatic residues, including an invariant arg-phe-pro motif. Mutation in one of the family members (bestrophin 1) is associated with vitelliform macular dystrophy. The bestrophin 2 gene is mainly expressed in the non-pigmented ciliary epithelium and colon.
