= Vitelliform macular dystrophy =

- Other names: Vitelliform dystrophy
- Best disease, the early-onset form of vitelliform macular dystrophy, has an autosomal dominant pattern of inheritance.
- Specialty: Ophthalmology, medical genetics

Vitelliform macular dystrophy is an irregular autosomal dominant eye disorder which can cause progressive vision loss. This disorder affects the retina, specifically cells in a small area near the center of the retina called the macula. The macula is responsible for sharp central vision, which is needed for detailed tasks such as reading, driving, and recognizing faces. The condition is characterized by yellow (or orange), slightly elevated, round structures similar to the yolk (Latin vitellus) of an egg.

== Genetics ==
Best disease is inherited in an autosomal dominant pattern, which means one copy of the altered gene in each cell is sufficient to cause the disorder. In most cases, an affected person has one parent with the condition.

The inheritance pattern of adult-onset vitelliform macular dystrophy is definitively autosomal dominant. Many affected people, however, have no history of the disorder in their family and only a small number of affected families have been reported. This is because the penetrance of the condition is incomplete; therefore, it is possible for an individual to have a copy of the mutant allele and not display the VMD phenotype. The ratio of males to females is approximately 1:1.

== Pathophysiology ==
Mutations in the RDS and VMD2 genes cause vitelliform macular dystrophy. Mutations in the VMD2 gene are responsible for Best disease. Changes in either the VMD2 or RDS gene can cause the adult-onset form of vitelliform macular dystrophy; however, fewer than a quarter of cases result from mutations in these two genes. In most cases, the cause of the adult-onset form is unknown.

The VMD2 gene provides instructions for making a protein called bestrophin. Although its exact function is uncertain, this protein likely acts as a channel that controls the movement of negatively charged chlorine atoms (chloride ions) into or out of cells in the retina. Mutations in the VMD2 gene probably lead to the production of an abnormally shaped channel that cannot regulate the flow of chloride. Researchers have not determined how these malfunctioning channels are related to the buildup of lipofuscin in the macula and progressive vision loss.

The RDS gene provides instructions for making a protein called peripherin. This protein is essential for the normal function of light-sensing (photoreceptor) cells in the retina. Mutations in the RDS gene disrupt the structures in these cells that contain light-sensing pigments, leading to vision loss. It is unclear why RDS mutations affect only central vision in people with adult-onset vitelliform macular dystrophy.

== Diagnosis ==
Vitelliform macular dystrophy causes a fatty yellow pigment (lipofuscin) to build up in cells underlying the macula. The retinal pigment epithelium also degenerates. Over time, the abnormal accumulation of this substance can damage the cells that are critical for clear central vision. As a result, people with this disorder often lose their central vision and may experience blurry or distorted vision, and loss is rarely symmetric. Scotomata appear, first with red light and then for green; finally, relative (or in more serious cases, absolute) scotomata occur with white light. Vitelliform macular dystrophy does not affect side (peripheral) vision or the ability to see at night.

Researchers have described two forms of vitelliform macular dystrophy with similar features. The early-onset form (known as Best disease) usually appears in childhood; however, the onset of symptoms and the severity of vision loss vary widely. The adult-onset form begins later, usually in middle age, and tends to cause relatively mild vision loss. The two forms of vitelliform macular dystrophy each have characteristic changes in the macula that can be detected during an eye examination.
