= CLIC2 =

Protein-coding gene in humans

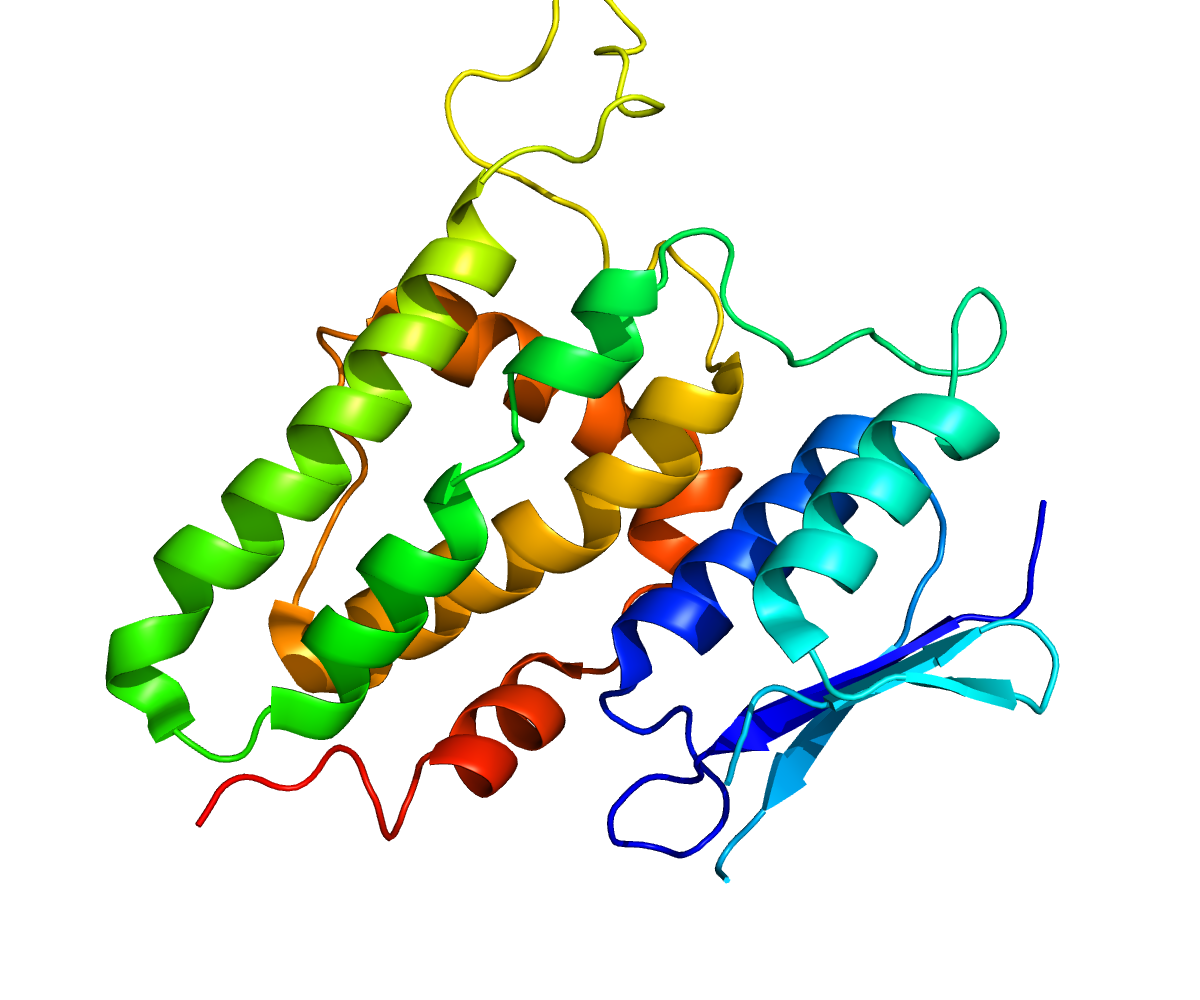

Identifiers
- Aliases: CLIC2, CLIC2b, MRXS32, XAP121, chloride intracellular channel 2, CLCNL2
- External IDs: OMIM: 300138; GeneCards: CLIC2
Available structures
PDB	Human UniProt search: PDBe RCSB
PDB	List of PDB id codes 2PER, 2R4V, 2R5G

Gene location (Human)
Chr.	X chromosome (human)
Band	Xq28	Start	155,276,211 bp
Band	Xq28	End	155,334,657 bp
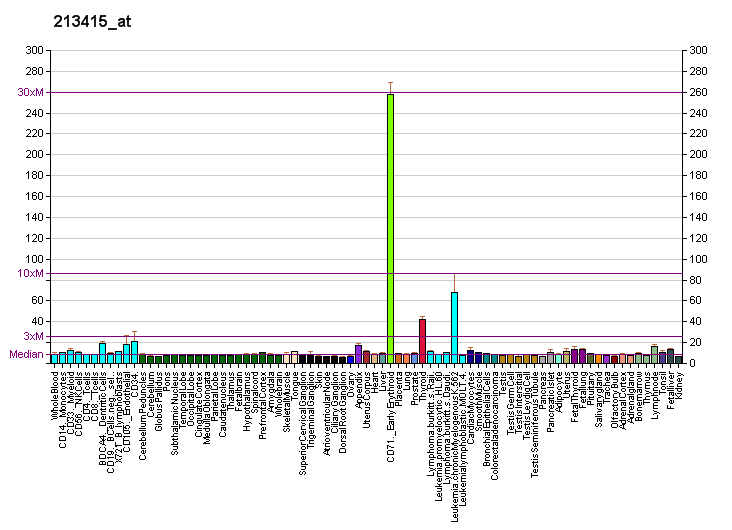
RNA expression pattern
Bgee	Human / Mouse (ortholog); Top expressed in: Achilles tendon; epithelium of colon; right lung; spleen; upper lobe of left lung; gallbladder; superficial temporal artery; lymph node; left lobe of thyroid gland; right lobe of thyroid gland / n/a; More reference expression data
BioGPS	More reference expression data
Gene ontology
Molecular function	glutathione transferase activity; voltage-gated ion channel activity; glutathione peroxidase activity; protein binding; chloride channel activity
Cellular component	cytoplasm; integral component of membrane; membrane; intracellular anatomical structure; chloride channel complex; nucleus
Biological process	regulation of cardiac muscle contraction by regulation of the release of sequestered calcium ion; regulation of ion transmembrane transport; ion transport; negative regulation of ryanodine-sensitive calcium-release channel activity; positive regulation of binding; chloride transport; regulation of release of sequestered calcium ion into cytosol by sarcoplasmic reticulum; signal transduction; cellular oxidant detoxification; glutathione metabolic process; chloride transmembrane transport
Sources:Amigo / QuickGO
Orthologs
Databases	NCBI: entry; OMA: entry
Species	Human	Mouse
Entrez	1193	n/a
Ensembl	ENSG00000155962	n/a
UniProt	O15247	n/a
RefSeq (mRNA)	NM_001289	n/a
RefSeq (protein)	NP_001280	n/a
Location (UCSC)	Chr X: 155.28 – 155.33 Mb	n/a
PubMed search		n/a
- Wikidata
View/Edit Human

Chloride intracellular channel protein 2 is a protein that in humans is encoded by the CLIC2 gene.

Chloride channels are a diverse group of proteins that regulate fundamental cellular processes including stabilization of cell membrane potential, transepithelial transport, maintenance of intracellular pH, and regulation of cell volume. Chloride intracellular channel 2 is a member of the p64 family; the protein is detected in fetal liver and adult skeletal muscle tissue. This gene maps to the candidate region on chromosome X for incontinentia pigmenti.

== See also ==
- Chloride channel
