= CLIC1 =

Protein-coding gene in the species Homo sapiens

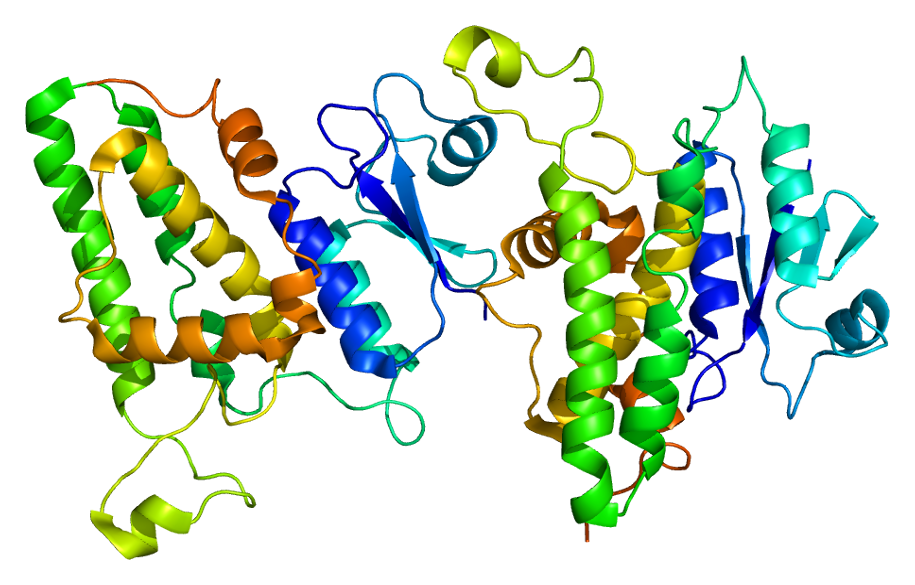

Identifiers
- Aliases: CLIC1, G6, NCC27, chloride intracellular channel 1, CL1C1, CLCNL1
- External IDs: OMIM: 602872; MGI: 2148924; GeneCards: CLIC1
Available structures
PDB	Ortholog search: PDBe RCSB
PDB	List of PDB id codes 1K0M, 1K0N, 1K0O, 1RK4, 3O3T, 3P8W, 3P90, 3QR6, 3SWL, 3TGZ, 3UVH, 4IQA, 4JZQ, 4K0G, 4K0N
Enzyme activity
EC #	BRENDA	ExPASy	KEGG	MetaCyc
1.8.5.1	↗	↗	↗	↗

Gene location (Human)
Chr.	Chromosome 6 (human)
Band	6p21.33	Start	31,730,581 bp
Band	6p21.33	End	31,739,763 bp

Gene location (Mouse)
Chr.	Chromosome 17 (mouse)
Band	17 B1|17 18.58 cM	Start	35,268,942 bp
Band	17 B1|17 18.58 cM	End	35,277,725 bp
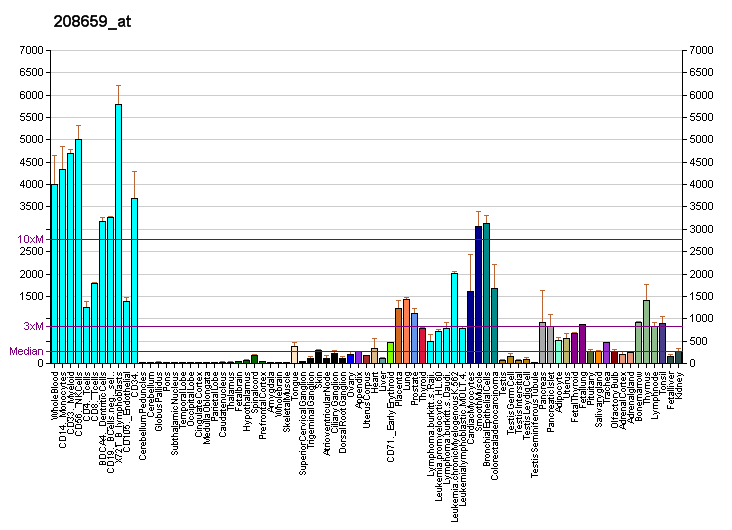
RNA expression pattern
Bgee	Human / Mouse (ortholog); Top expressed in: granulocyte; blood; monocyte; mucosa of transverse colon; rectum; gallbladder; islet of Langerhans; olfactory zone of nasal mucosa; placenta; right lung / Top expressed in: corneal stroma; granulocyte; superior surface of tongue; thymus; endothelial cell of lymphatic vessel; pyloric antrum; lip; mucous cell of stomach; dermis; cervix; More reference expression data
BioGPS	More reference expression data
Gene ontology
Molecular function	voltage-gated ion channel activity; protein binding; chloride channel activity; cadherin binding; glutathione transferase activity
Cellular component	cytoplasm; integral component of membrane; vesicle; nuclear membrane; blood microparticle; nuclear envelope; membrane; plasma membrane; chloride channel complex; mitochondrion; brush border; perinuclear region of cytoplasm; extracellular exosome; nucleus; extracellular space
Biological process	regulation of ion transmembrane transport; ion transport; regulation of cell cycle; regulation of mitochondrial membrane potential; positive regulation of osteoblast differentiation; chloride transport; platelet aggregation; signal transduction; chloride transmembrane transport; glutathione metabolic process; transport
Sources:Amigo / QuickGO
Orthologs
Databases	NCBI: entry; OMA: entry
Species	Human	Mouse
Entrez	1192	114584
Ensembl	ENSG00000213719; ENSG00000223639; ENSG00000226248; ENSG00000226651; ENSG00000226417 ENSG00000230685; ENSG00000206394	ENSMUSG00000007041
UniProt	O00299	Q9Z1Q5
RefSeq (mRNA)	NM_001288; NM_001287593; NM_001287594	NM_033444
RefSeq (protein)	NP_001274522; NP_001274523; NP_001279	NP_254279
Location (UCSC)	Chr 6: 31.73 – 31.74 Mb	Chr 17: 35.27 – 35.28 Mb
PubMed search
- Wikidata
View/Edit Human	View/Edit Mouse

Chloride intracellular channel protein 1 is a protein that in humans is encoded by the CLIC1 gene.

Chloride channels are a diverse group of proteins that regulate fundamental cellular processes including stabilization of cell membrane potential, transepithelial transport, maintenance of intracellular pH, and regulation of cell volume. Chloride intracellular channel 1 is a member of the p64 family; the protein localizes principally to the cell nucleus and exhibits both nuclear and plasma membrane chloride ion channel activity.

CLIC1 is highly expressed in murine and human microglia, the innate immune cells of the central nervous system. It regulates the motility and ramification of microglial processes, which are essential for continuous surveillance of the brain parenchyma. CLIC1 is also important for the inflammatory potential of microglia by controlling the NLRP3-dependent release of interleukin-1β. Contrary to its name, these functions are not mediated by CLIC1's ion channel activity but depend on its scaffold and enzymatic properties.

== Interactions ==
CLIC1 has been shown to interact with TRAPPC2.

== See also ==
- Chloride channel
