= ANO1 =

Protein-coding gene in the species Homo sapiens

Identifiers
- Aliases: ANO1, DOG1, ORAOV2, TAOS2, TMEM16A, anoctamin 1
- External IDs: OMIM: 610108; MGI: 2142149; GeneCards: ANO1

Gene location (Human)
Chr.	Chromosome 11 (human)
Band	11q13.3	Start	69,985,907 bp
Band	11q13.3	End	70,189,530 bp

Gene location (Mouse)
Chr.	Chromosome 7 (mouse)
Band	7|7 F5	Start	144,142,286 bp
Band	7|7 F5	End	144,305,711 bp
RNA expression pattern
Bgee	Human / Mouse (ortholog); Top expressed in: caput epididymis; seminal vesicula; corpus epididymis; parotid gland; ascending aorta; gallbladder; Descending thoracic aorta; gastric mucosa; tail of epididymis; right coronary artery / Top expressed in: parotid gland; gastrula; wall of urinary bladder; mucosa of urinary bladder; transitional epithelium of urinary bladder; left colon; submandibular gland; decidua; seminal vesicula; lacrimal gland; More reference expression data
BioGPS	n/a
Gene ontology
Molecular function	calcium activated cation channel activity; protein dimerization activity; protein binding; voltage-gated chloride channel activity; chloride channel activity; iodide transmembrane transporter activity; intracellular calcium activated chloride channel activity
Cellular component	cytoplasm; integral component of membrane; membrane; plasma membrane; chloride channel complex; apical plasma membrane; extracellular exosome
Biological process	cation transport; ion transport; detection of temperature stimulus involved in sensory perception of pain; multicellular organism development; phospholipase C-activating G protein-coupled receptor signaling pathway; ion transmembrane transport; iodide transport; chloride transport; cation transmembrane transport; regulation of anion transmembrane transport; transport; cellular response to heat; positive regulation of insulin secretion involved in cellular response to glucose stimulus; chloride transmembrane transport
Sources:Amigo / QuickGO
Orthologs
Databases	NCBI: entry; OMA: entry
Species	Human	Mouse
Entrez	55107	101772
Ensembl	ENSG00000131620	ENSMUSG00000031075
UniProt	Q5XXA6	Q8BHY3
RefSeq (mRNA)	NM_018043; NM_001378092; NM_001378093; NM_001378094; NM_001378095 NM_001378096; NM_001378097	NM_001242349; NM_178642
RefSeq (protein)	NP_060513; NP_001365021; NP_001365022; NP_001365023; NP_001365024 NP_001365025; NP_001365026	NP_001229278; NP_848757
Location (UCSC)	Chr 11: 69.99 – 70.19 Mb	Chr 7: 144.14 – 144.31 Mb
PubMed search
- Wikidata
View/Edit Human	View/Edit Mouse

Anoctamin-1 (ANO1), also known as Transmembrane member 16A (TMEM16A), is a protein that, in humans, is encoded by the ANO1 gene. Anoctamin-1 is a voltage-gated calcium-activated anion channel, which acts as a chloride channel and a bicarbonate channel. additionally Anoctamin-1 is apical iodide channel.

It is expressed in smooth muscle, epithelial cells, vomeronasal neurons, olfactory sustentacular cells, and is highly expressed in interstitial cells of Cajal (ICC) throughout the gastrointestinal tract.

== Function ==
ANO1 is a transmembrane protein that functions as a calcium-activated chloride channel. Ca^{2+}, Sr^{2+}, and Ba^{2+} activate the channel.

== Structure ==
No atomic resolution structure of this channel has yet been obtained. However, biochemical evidence suggests that the channel assembles as a dimer of two ANO1 polypeptide subunits. From hydropathy plotting, each subunit is thought to encode a molecule with eight transmembrane domains, with a reentrant loop between the fifth and sixth transmembrane domains. The reentrant loop is thought to be a P loop-like structure responsible for the ion selectivity of the protein.

== Clinical significance ==
In mice, the functional expression of the ANO1 channel is essential to life, as its absence leads to a premature death due to respiratory collapse.

ANO1 is expressed in the gastrointestinal tract and is highly expressed in interstitial cells of Cajal, where it plays an important role in pacemaker activity, neurotransduction of enteric motor neurotransmitters and regulation of gastrointestinal motility. ANO1 blockers like niflumic acid have been shown to block slow waves, which produce phasic contractions and the major patterns of gastrointestinal motility, such as peristalsis and segmentation. ANO1-knockout mice fail to produce slow waves altogether. Carbachol has been shown to markedly activate the channel due to its effect on release of Ca2+ from intracellular stores. ANO1 activation is necessary for normal function of ICC and generation of normal patterns of activity in smooth muscles of the gastrointestinal tract.

Its overexpression was reported in esophageal squamous cell carcinoma and breast cancer progression.
