= CLIC4 =

Protein-coding gene in humans

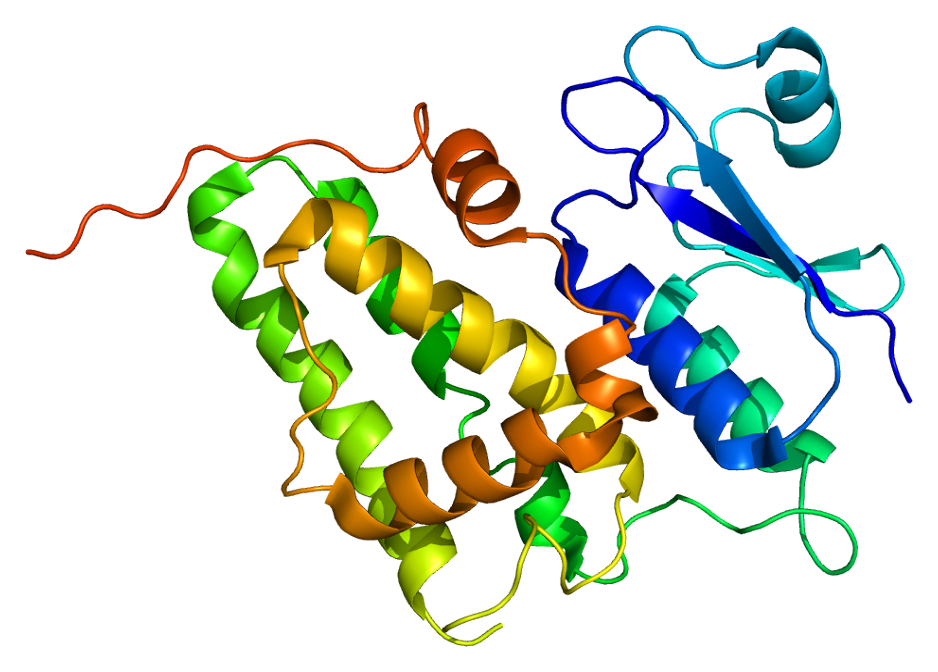

Identifiers
- Aliases: CLIC4, CLIC4L, H1, MTCLIC, huH1, p64H1, chloride intracellular channel 4
- External IDs: OMIM: 606536; MGI: 1352754; GeneCards: CLIC4
Available structures
PDB	Ortholog search: PDBe RCSB
PDB	List of PDB id codes 2AHE, 2D2Z, 3OQS

Gene location (Human)
Chr.	Chromosome 1 (human)
Band	1p36.11	Start	24,745,382 bp
Band	1p36.11	End	24,844,321 bp

Gene location (Mouse)
Chr.	Chromosome 4 (mouse)
Band	4|4 D3	Start	134,941,280 bp
Band	4|4 D3	End	135,000,125 bp
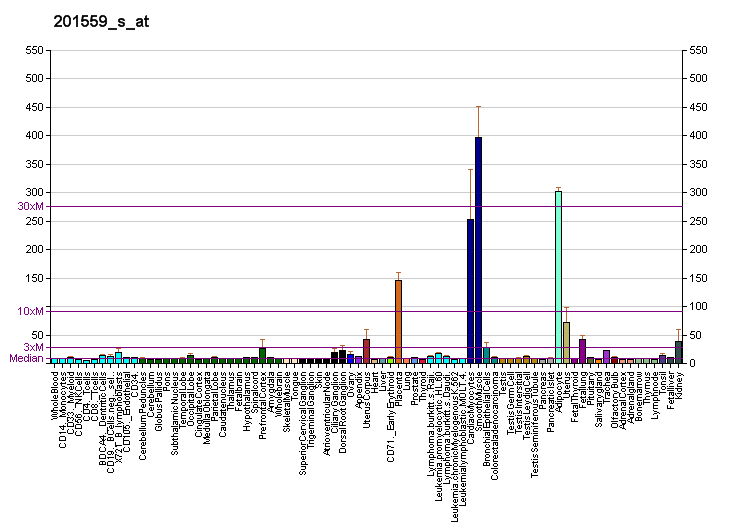

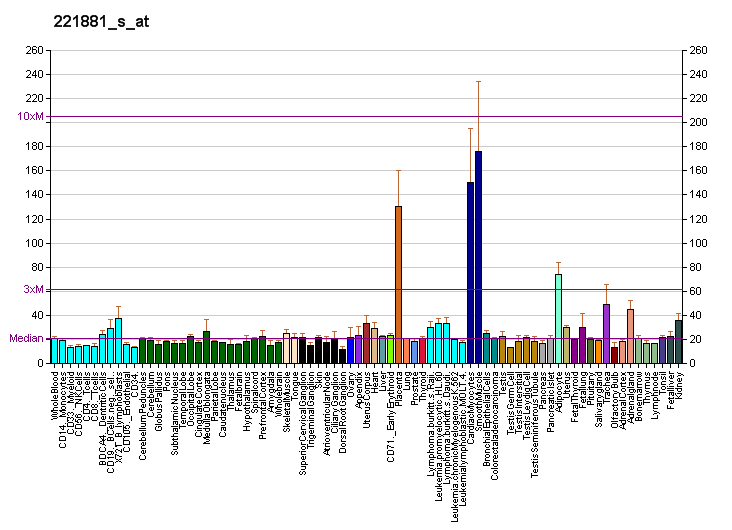

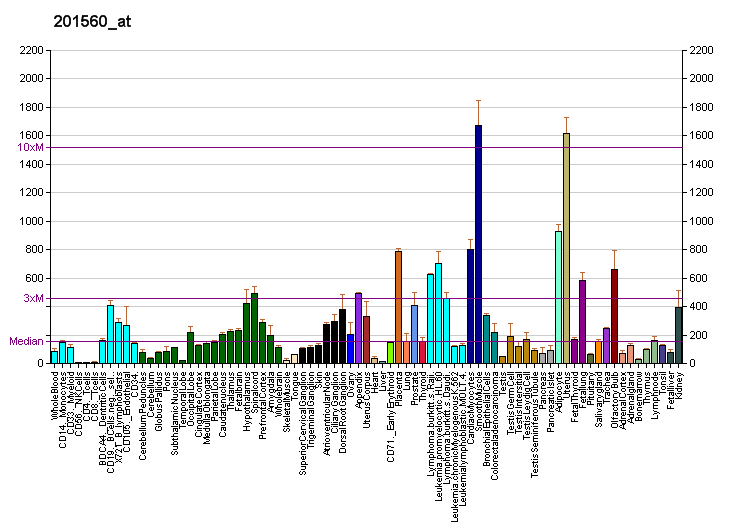
RNA expression pattern
Bgee	Human / Mouse (ortholog); Top expressed in: saphenous vein; tail of epididymis; popliteal artery; tibial arteries; vena cava; Descending thoracic aorta; smooth muscle tissue; ascending aorta; right coronary artery; urethra / Top expressed in: gastrula; right lung; right lung lobe; decidua; ascending aorta; cardiac muscle tissue of left ventricle; sciatic nerve; semi-lunar valve; left lung; atrioventricular valve; More reference expression data
BioGPS	More reference expression data
Gene ontology
Molecular function	voltage-gated ion channel activity; protein binding; glutathione transferase activity; chloride channel activity
Cellular component	cytoplasm; integral component of membrane; cytosol; centrosome; membrane; cell-cell junction; nuclear matrix; microtubule cytoskeleton; plasma membrane; apical part of cell; intracellular anatomical structure; chloride channel complex; microtubule organizing center; microvillus; cell surface; cell junction; midbody; mitochondrion; actin cytoskeleton; perinuclear region of cytoplasm; extracellular exosome; cytoskeleton; cytoplasmic vesicle membrane; cytoplasmic vesicle; nucleus
Biological process	cellular response to calcium ion; cell differentiation; multicellular organism growth; regulation of ion transmembrane transport; endothelial cell morphogenesis; ion transport; keratinocyte differentiation; vacuolar acidification; negative regulation of cell migration; fertilization; establishment or maintenance of apical/basal cell polarity; chloride transport; branching morphogenesis of an epithelial tube; retina vasculature morphogenesis in camera-type eye; regulation of cytoskeleton organization; angiogenesis; glutathione metabolic process; chloride transmembrane transport; transport; ion transmembrane transport
Sources:Amigo / QuickGO
Orthologs
Databases	NCBI: entry; OMA: entry
Species	Human	Mouse
Entrez	25932	29876
Ensembl	ENSG00000169504	ENSMUSG00000037242
UniProt	Q9Y696	Q9QYB1
RefSeq (mRNA)	NM_013943	NM_013885
RefSeq (protein)	NP_039234	NP_038913
Location (UCSC)	Chr 1: 24.75 – 24.84 Mb	Chr 4: 134.94 – 135 Mb
PubMed search
- Wikidata
View/Edit Human	View/Edit Mouse

Chloride intracellular channel 4, also known as CLIC4,p644H1,HuH1, is a eukaryotic gene.

Chloride channels are a diverse group of proteins that regulate fundamental cellular processes including stabilization of cell membrane potential, transepithelial transport, maintenance of intracellular pH, and regulation of cell volume. Chloride intracellular channel 4 (CLIC4) protein, encoded by the clic4 gene, is a member of the p64 family; the gene is expressed in many tissues. These channels are implicated in angiogenesis, pulmonary hypertension, cancer, and cardioprotection from ischemia-reperfusion injury. They exhibit an intracellular vesicular pattern in PANC-1 cells (pancreatic cancer cells).

== Binding partners ==
CLIC4 binds to dynamin I, α-tubulin, β-actin, creatine kinase and two 14-3-3 isoforms.

== See also ==
- Chloride channel
