= Company Level Intelligence Cell =

A Company Level Intelligence Cell (CLIC) is a United States Marine Corps program that both pushes down 0231 Marine Corps Intelligence Specialists from their Battalion S-2 down to the rifle companies while simultaneously augmenting them with selected 0311 Infantry who can conduct basic intelligence work. While intelligence Marines were pushed down to the company level as individual augments before the conception of the cell, there was no formal naming convention or organization for individual augments. Marine Corps Interim Publication (MCIP) 2-1.01, Company Level Intelligence Cell, establishes the doctrinal basis for the planning and execution of intelligence support to operations at the company level.

== Organization ==
The CLIC's development was driven for counterinsurgency missions. An article in the Marine Corps Gazette in August 2015 by LtCol Dinsmore and Capt Gowan stated: “The intelligence T/O at an infantry battalion consists of 3 officers and 13 enlisted Marines. The enlisted T/O includes one gunnery sergeant, two sergeants, and six corporals. The remainder are lance corporal and below. The basic CLIC is staffed by one intelligence corporal (0231) and one infantry Marine (03XX) at the company headquarters. Some battalions further augment company intelligence with 03XX Marines at the platoon level. These company and platoon 03XX Marines are provided individual intelligence training and operate under the supervision and mentorship of the 0231 CLIC chief. Given today’s potential number of collections assets under an infantry company’s control, this basic CLIC T/O is indispensable. Beyond basic reporting, map tracking, and briefing/debriefing skills, the CLICs are trained in TSE, long-range high-frequency radio operations, and in intelligence collections and targeting. An independently operating CLIC in an EF 21 CLT would likely carry additional demands and require a more experienced Marine. The current battalion section T/O, however, is likely sufficient for the employment of CLICs in conventional offensive, defensive, and amphibious missions, as well as for task-organization in support of disaggregated CLT or other independent operations.”

== Other services ==
Other land services have similar programs, as a result of the innovations of the OIF and OEF. Junior officers in both British Army and US Army have published professional articles describing this innovation. In the British and USA incarnations, though, the cell is fully internal to the Co unit, drawing only soldiers inside the company with no augmentation from the parent Battalion S-2.

These junior officers have recommended that the FO lieutenant take on the duty of the Co S-2 Officer in Charge, and find smart soldiers to staff the cell. They also recommend that the CO rotate in squad leaders and team leaders from the line infantry squads, to get a fresh perspective. The OIC should also accompany patrols sometimes to understand what he is studying.
