= CLIC6 =

Protein-coding gene in the species Homo sapiens

Identifiers
- Aliases: CLIC6, CLIC1L, chloride intracellular channel 6
- External IDs: OMIM: 615321; MGI: 2146607; GeneCards: CLIC6

Gene location (Human)
Chr.	Chromosome 21 (human)
Band	21q22.12	Start	34,668,994 bp
Band	21q22.12	End	34,718,227 bp

Gene location (Mouse)
Chr.	Chromosome 16 (mouse)
Band	16|16 C4	Start	92,282,624 bp
Band	16|16 C4	End	92,338,131 bp
RNA expression pattern
Bgee	Human / Mouse (ortholog); Top expressed in: retinal pigment epithelium; bronchial epithelial cell; nasal epithelium; caput epididymis; palpebral conjunctiva; epithelium of nasopharynx; mucosa of paranasal sinus; pancreatic epithelial cell; olfactory zone of nasal mucosa; pancreatic ductal cell / Top expressed in: Epithelium of choroid plexus; epithelium of stomach; retinal pigment epithelium; olfactory epithelium; ciliary body; migratory enteric neural crest cell; epithelium of small intestine; yolk sac; left colon; efferent ductule; More reference expression data
BioGPS	n/a
Gene ontology
Molecular function	voltage-gated ion channel activity; glutathione transferase activity; chloride channel activity; D2 dopamine receptor binding; D3 dopamine receptor binding; D4 dopamine receptor binding
Cellular component	integral component of membrane; plasma membrane; extracellular exosome; membrane; chloride channel complex; nucleus; cytoplasm
Biological process	regulation of ion transmembrane transport; chloride transport; ion transport; glutathione metabolic process; chloride transmembrane transport; transport; ion transmembrane transport
Sources:Amigo / QuickGO
Orthologs
Databases	NCBI: entry; OMA: entry
Species	Human	Mouse
Entrez	54102	209195
Ensembl	ENSG00000159212	ENSMUSG00000022949
UniProt	Q96NY7	Q8BHB9
RefSeq (mRNA)	NM_053277; NM_001317009	NM_172469
RefSeq (protein)	NP_001303938; NP_444507	NP_766057
Location (UCSC)	Chr 21: 34.67 – 34.72 Mb	Chr 16: 92.28 – 92.34 Mb
PubMed search
- Wikidata
View/Edit Human	View/Edit Mouse

Chloride intracellular channel protein 6 is a protein that in humans is encoded by the CLIC6 gene.

The CLIC6 gene encodes a member of the chloride intracellular channel family of proteins. The gene is part of a large triplicated region found on chromosomes 1, 6, and 21. An alternatively spliced transcript variant has been described, but its biological validity has not been determined.

== Interactions ==
CLIC6 has been shown to interact with Dopamine receptor D3.

== Function ==
CLIC6 has been shown to form chloride selective redox and pH regulated ion channels. It is predominantly expressed in the plasma membrane of lung epithelial cells.

== See also ==
- Chloride channel
