= CLIC3 =

Protein-coding gene in the species Homo sapiens

Identifiers
- Aliases: CLIC3, chloride intracellular channel 3
- External IDs: OMIM: 606533; MGI: 1916704; GeneCards: CLIC3
Available structures
PDB	Ortholog search: PDBe RCSB
PDB	List of PDB id codes 3FY7, 3KJY

Gene location (Human)
Chr.	Chromosome 9 (human)
Band	9q34.3	Start	136,994,608 bp
Band	9q34.3	End	136,996,568 bp

Gene location (Mouse)
Chr.	Chromosome 2 (mouse)
Band	2|2 A3	Start	25,346,850 bp
Band	2|2 A3	End	25,348,788 bp
RNA expression pattern
Bgee	Human / Mouse (ortholog); Top expressed in: oral cavity; right lobe of thyroid gland; left lobe of thyroid gland; skin of abdomen; skin of leg; granulocyte; mucosa of pharynx; right lung; gums; placenta / Top expressed in: lip; esophagus; right lung lobe; left lung; left lung lobe; corneal stroma; skin of external ear; skin of back; skin of abdomen; umbilical cord; More reference expression data
BioGPS	n/a
Gene ontology
Molecular function	protein binding; voltage-gated ion channel activity; chloride channel activity; glutathione transferase activity
Cellular component	cytoplasm; integral component of membrane; extracellular exosome; membrane; nucleus; chloride channel complex; nuclear body
Biological process	regulation of ion transmembrane transport; chloride transport; ion transport; signal transduction; chloride transmembrane transport; glutathione metabolic process; transport; ion transmembrane transport
Sources:Amigo / QuickGO
Orthologs
Databases	NCBI: entry; OMA: entry
Species	Human	Mouse
Entrez	9022	69454
Ensembl	ENSG00000169583	ENSMUSG00000015093
UniProt	O95833	Q9D7P7
RefSeq (mRNA)	NM_004669	NM_027085
RefSeq (protein)	NP_004660	NP_081361
Location (UCSC)	Chr 9: 136.99 – 137 Mb	Chr 2: 25.35 – 25.35 Mb
PubMed search
- Wikidata
View/Edit Human	View/Edit Mouse

Chloride intracellular channel protein 3 is a protein that in humans is encoded by the CLIC3 gene. This protein is a chloride channel.

== See also ==
- Chloride channel
