= CLCA4 =

Protein-coding gene in humans

Identifiers
- Aliases: CLCA4, CaCC, CaCC2, chloride channel accessory 4
- External IDs: OMIM: 616857; MGI: 2139744; GeneCards: CLCA4

Gene location (Human)
| Chr. | Chromosome 1 (human) |
| Band | 1p22.3 | Start | 86,547,078 bp |
| Band | 1p22.3 | End | 86,580,754 bp |

Gene location (Mouse)
| Chr. | Chromosome 3 (mouse) |
| Band | 3|3 H2 | Start | 144,658,241 bp |
| Band | 3|3 H2 | End | 144,680,806 bp |
RNA expression pattern
| Bgee | Human / Mouse (ortholog); Top expressed in: mucosa of colon; mucosa of sigmoid colon; oral cavity; mucosa of pharynx; rectum; mucosa of transverse colon; cervix epithelium; mucosa of urinary bladder; mucosa of ileum; nasal epithelium / Top expressed in: jejunum; Paneth cell; left colon; ileum; duodenum; conjunctival fornix; lumbar subsegment of spinal cord; cornea; ciliary body; embryo; More reference expression data |
| BioGPS | n/a |
Gene ontology
| Molecular function | peptidase activity; hydrolase activity; metallopeptidase activity; metal ion binding; chloride channel activity; metalloendopeptidase activity; intracellular calcium activated chloride channel activity |
| Cellular component | integral component of membrane; extracellular region; plasma membrane; integral component of plasma membrane; apical plasma membrane; membrane |
| Biological process | ion transmembrane transport; chloride transport; proteolysis; chloride transmembrane transport |
Sources:Amigo / QuickGO
Orthologs
| Databases | NCBI: entry; OMA: entry |
| Species | Human | Mouse |
| Entrez | 22802 | 99663 |
| Ensembl | ENSG00000016602 | ENSMUSG00000068547 |
| UniProt | Q14CN2 | Q6Q473 |
| RefSeq (mRNA) | NM_012128 | NM_207208 |
| RefSeq (protein) | NP_036260 | NP_997091 |
| Location (UCSC) | Chr 1: 86.55 – 86.58 Mb | Chr 3: 144.66 – 144.68 Mb |
| PubMed search |
- Wikidata
| View/Edit Human | View/Edit Mouse |

Chloride channel accessory 4, also known as CLCA4, is a protein which in humans CLCA4 gene. The protein encoded by this gene is a chloride channel. Protein structure prediction methods suggest the N-terminal region of CLCA4 protein is a zinc metalloprotease, and the protein is not an ion channel per se.

== See also ==
- Chloride channel
