= CLCA2 =

Protein-coding gene in humans

Identifiers
- Aliases: CLCA2, CACC, CACC3, CLCRG2, CaCC-3, chloride channel accessory 2
- External IDs: OMIM: 604003; MGI: 2139758; GeneCards: CLCA2

Gene location (Human)
Chr.	Chromosome 1 (human)
Band	1p22.3	Start	86,424,171 bp
Band	1p22.3	End	86,456,553 bp

Gene location (Mouse)
Chr.	Chromosome 3 (mouse)
Band	3|3 H2	Start	144,776,024 bp
Band	3|3 H2	End	144,805,204 bp
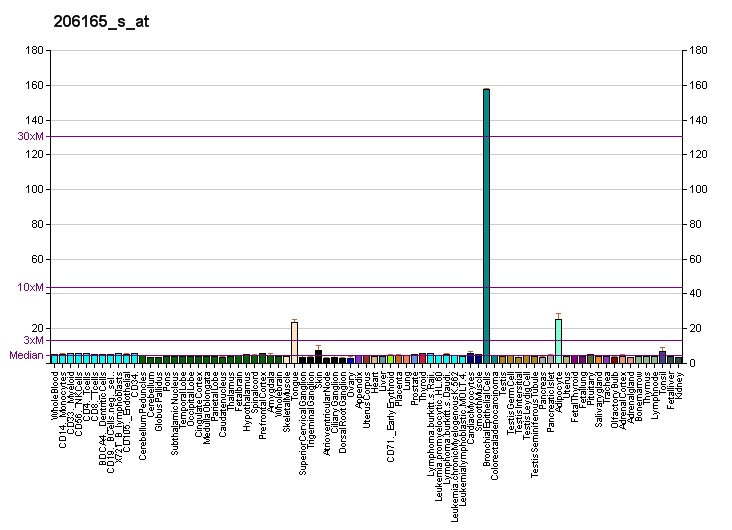

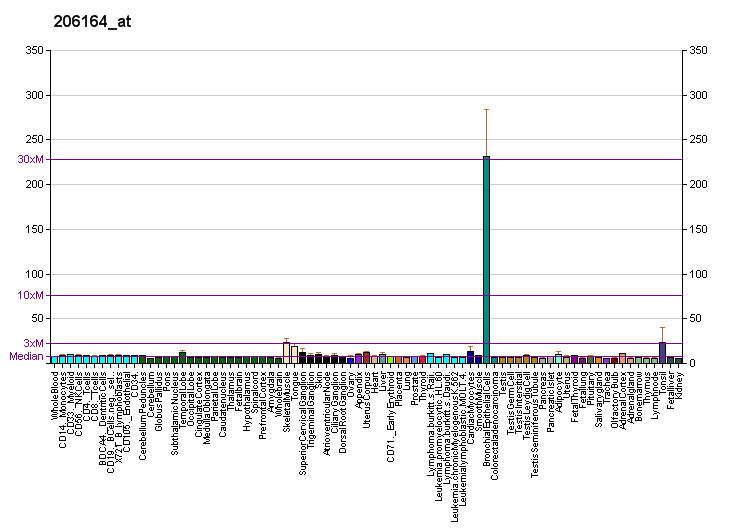

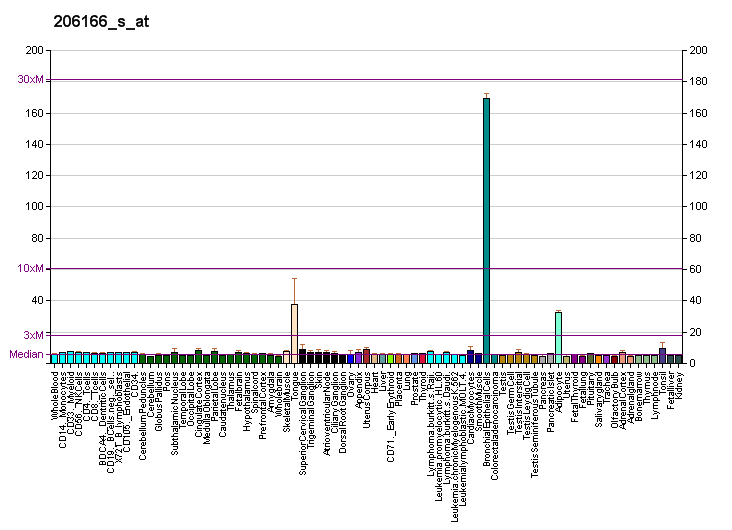
RNA expression pattern
Bgee	Human / Mouse (ortholog); Top expressed in: gingival epithelium; human penis; skin of thigh; vulva; oral cavity; hair follicle; skin of arm; bronchial epithelial cell; skin of hip; mucosa of pharynx / Top expressed in: skin of external ear; esophagus; lower jaw; skin of back; incisor; mandibular molars; skin of abdomen; lip; embryo; Meckel's cartilage; More reference expression data
BioGPS	More reference expression data
Gene ontology
Molecular function	metal ion binding; peptidase activity; ligand-gated ion channel activity; hydrolase activity; metallopeptidase activity; chloride channel activity; metalloendopeptidase activity; intracellular calcium activated chloride channel activity
Cellular component	integral component of membrane; membrane; integral component of plasma membrane; extracellular region; cell junction; basal plasma membrane; nucleus; cytosol; plasma membrane; nuclear membrane
Biological process	chloride transmembrane transport; ion transport; proteolysis; cell adhesion; chloride transport; ion transmembrane transport
Sources:Amigo / QuickGO
Orthologs
Databases	NCBI: entry; OMA: entry
Species	Human	Mouse
Entrez	9635	229933
Ensembl	ENSG00000137975	ENSMUSG00000036960
UniProt	Q9UQC9	Q8BG22
RefSeq (mRNA)	NM_006536	NM_178697
RefSeq (protein)	NP_006527	NP_848812
Location (UCSC)	Chr 1: 86.42 – 86.46 Mb	Chr 3: 144.78 – 144.81 Mb
PubMed search
- Wikidata
View/Edit Human	View/Edit Mouse

Chloride channel accessory 2 is a protein that in humans is encoded by the CLCA2 gene.

The protein encoded by this gene belongs to the calcium sensitive chloride conductance protein family. To date, all members of this gene family map to the same site on chromosome 1p31-p22 and share high degrees of homology in size, sequence and predicted structure, but differ significantly in their tissue distributions. Since this protein is expressed predominantly in trachea and lung, it is suggested to play a role in the complex pathogenesis of cystic fibrosis. It may also serve as adhesion molecule for lung metastatic cancer cells, mediating vascular arrest and colonization, and furthermore, it has been implicated to act as a tumor suppressor gene for breast cancer. Protein structure prediction methods suggest the N-terminal region of CLCA2 protein is a zinc metalloprotease.

== See also ==
- Chloride channel
