= CLCA1 =

Protein-coding gene in humans

Identifiers
- Aliases: CLCA1, CACC, CACC1, CLCRG1, CaCC-1, GOB5, hhCaCC-1, chloride channel accessory 1
- External IDs: OMIM: 603906; MGI: 1346342; GeneCards: CLCA1

Gene location (Human)
Chr.	Chromosome 1 (human)
Band	1p22.3	Start	86,468,368 bp
Band	1p22.3	End	86,500,259 bp

Gene location (Mouse)
Chr.	Chromosome 3 (mouse)
Band	3 H2|3 69.26 cM	Start	144,709,578 bp
Band	3 H2|3 69.26 cM	End	144,738,537 bp
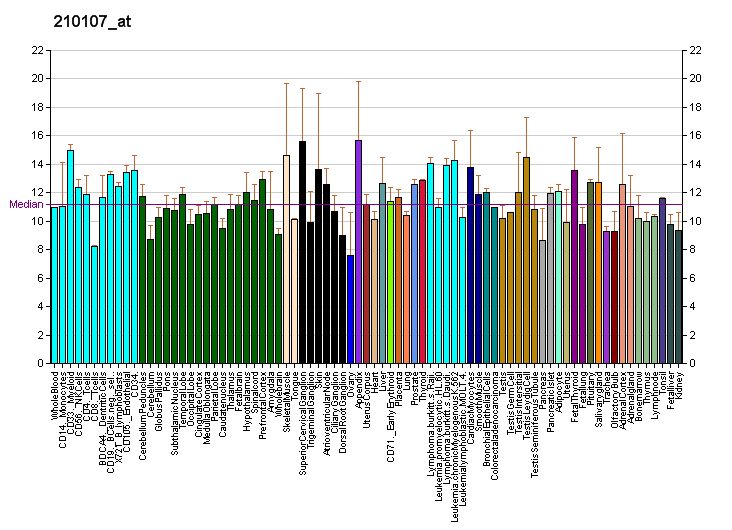
RNA expression pattern
Bgee	Human / Mouse (ortholog); Top expressed in: mucosa of ileum; mucosa of sigmoid colon; jejunal mucosa; mucosa of transverse colon; rectum; duodenum; cecum; appendix; pancreatic ductal cell; epithelium of colon / Top expressed in: left colon; intestinal villus; cervix; pyloric antrum; ileum; duodenum; mucous cell of stomach; crypt of lieberkuhn of small intestine; epithelium of small intestine; jejunum; More reference expression data
BioGPS	More reference expression data
Gene ontology
Molecular function	metal ion binding; peptidase activity; hydrolase activity; chloride channel activity; metallopeptidase activity; metalloendopeptidase activity; intracellular calcium activated chloride channel activity
Cellular component	extracellular region; integral component of membrane; integral component of plasma membrane; microvillus; zymogen granule membrane; membrane; plasma membrane; secretory granule; extracellular space
Biological process	calcium ion transport; proteolysis; chloride transport; ion transport; ion transmembrane transport; cellular response to hypoxia; chloride transmembrane transport
Sources:Amigo / QuickGO
Orthologs
Databases	NCBI: entry; OMA: entry
Species	Human	Mouse
Entrez	1179	23844
Ensembl	ENSG00000016490	ENSMUSG00000028255
UniProt	A8K7I4	Q9D7Z6
RefSeq (mRNA)	NM_001285	NM_017474
RefSeq (protein)	NP_001276	NP_059502
Location (UCSC)	Chr 1: 86.47 – 86.5 Mb	Chr 3: 144.71 – 144.74 Mb
PubMed search
- Wikidata
View/Edit Human	View/Edit Mouse

Chloride channel accessory 1 is a protein that in humans is encoded by the CLCA1 gene.

This gene encodes a member of the calcium sensitive chloride conductance protein family. To date, all members of this gene family map to the same region on chromosome 1p31-p22 and share a high degree of homology in size, sequence, and predicted structure, but differ significantly in their tissue distributions. The encoded protein is expressed as a precursor protein that is processed into two cell-surface-associated subunits, although the site at which the precursor is cleaved has not been precisely determined. The encoded protein may be involved in mediating calcium-activated chloride conductance in the intestine. Protein structure prediction methods suggest the N-terminal region of CLCA1 protein is a zinc metalloprotease.

== See also ==
- Chloride channel
