= CLIC5 =

Protein-coding gene in the species Homo sapiens

Identifiers
- Aliases: CLIC5, MST130, MSTP130, DFNB102, DFNB103, chloride intracellular channel 5
- External IDs: OMIM: 607293; MGI: 1917912; GeneCards: CLIC5

Gene location (Human)
Chr.	Chromosome 6 (human)
Band	6p21.1	Start	45,880,827 bp
Band	6p21.1	End	46,080,348 bp

Gene location (Mouse)
Chr.	Chromosome 17 (mouse)
Band	17|17 B3	Start	44,445,659 bp
Band	17|17 B3	End	44,591,059 bp
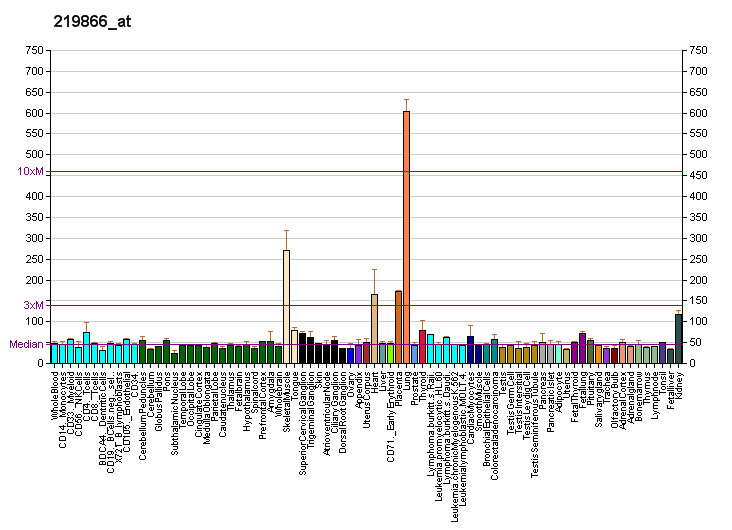

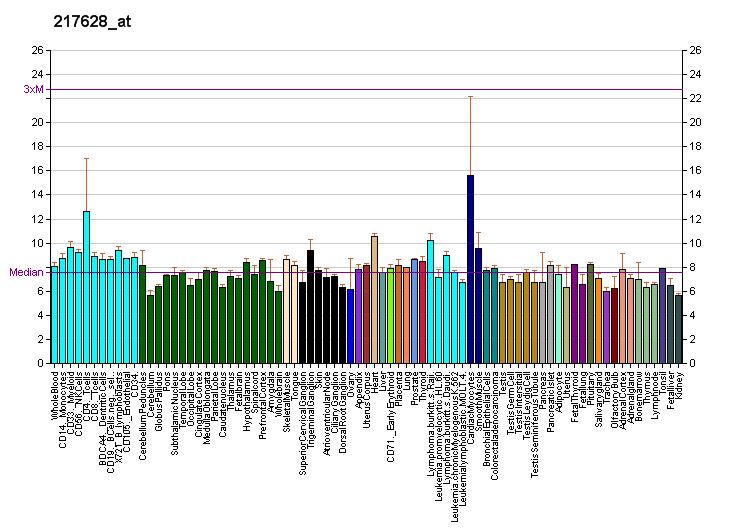
RNA expression pattern
Bgee	Human / Mouse (ortholog); Top expressed in: glomerulus; metanephric glomerulus; synovial joint; glutes; right ventricle; biceps brachii; Skeletal muscle tissue of rectus abdominis; germinal epithelium; Skeletal muscle tissue of biceps brachii; triceps brachii muscle / Top expressed in: right lung; right lung lobe; left lung lobe; interventricular septum; myocardium of ventricle; ankle; triceps brachii muscle; vastus lateralis muscle; temporal muscle; epithelium of small intestine; More reference expression data
BioGPS	More reference expression data
Gene ontology
Molecular function	protein binding; voltage-gated ion channel activity; glutathione transferase activity; chloride channel activity
Cellular component	cell cortex; microtubule organizing center; cytoskeleton; chloride channel complex; actin cytoskeleton; integral component of membrane; membrane; extracellular exosome; Golgi apparatus; nucleus; cytoplasm; plasma membrane; apical plasma membrane
Biological process	regulation of ion transmembrane transport; ion transport; hearing; female pregnancy; chloride transport; glutathione metabolic process; auditory receptor cell stereocilium organization; chloride transmembrane transport; transport; ion transmembrane transport; visual perception; response to stimulus
Sources:Amigo / QuickGO
Orthologs
Databases	NCBI: entry; OMA: entry
Species	Human	Mouse
Entrez	53405	224796
Ensembl	ENSG00000112782	ENSMUSG00000023959
UniProt	Q9NZA1; Q53G01; Q49AE1	Q8BXK9
RefSeq (mRNA)	NM_001114086; NM_001256023; NM_016929; NM_001370649; NM_001370650	NM_172621
RefSeq (protein)	NP_001107558; NP_001242952; NP_058625; NP_001357578; NP_001357579 NP_001107558.1; NP_058625.2; NP_001242952.1	NP_766209
Location (UCSC)	Chr 6: 45.88 – 46.08 Mb	Chr 17: 44.45 – 44.59 Mb
PubMed search
- Wikidata
View/Edit Human	View/Edit Mouse

Chloride intracellular channel protein 5 is a protein that in humans is encoded by the CLIC5 gene.

== Expression and localization ==
CLIC5 exists in two alternative splice variants, a smaller CLIC5A and larger CLIC5B protein.

CLIC5A is expressed chiefly in the renal glomerulus, specifically in podocytes. Within the cell, CLIC5A is localized to the plasma membrane and the cytosol, and associates and is regulated by the actin cytoskeleton. CLIC5A can form ion channels in vitro and its channel activity is regulated by actin, though measurement of its chloride conductance in vitro suggests that CLIC5A is equally selective for cations and anions. Even so, the function of CLICs as bona fide ion channels is controversial and has been disputed.

== Function ==
Although chloride intracellular channel (CLIC) proteins were thought to be involved in ion transport in subcellular compartments, their actual functions suggest their role in diverse cellular and physiological functions including apoptosis and angiogenesis in CLIC1.

CLIC5A, through its interactions with the small GTPase Rac1, induces the phosphorylation of ezrin-moeisin-radixin (ERM) proteins and localized production of the phosphoinositide phosphatidylinositol-4,5-bisphosphate. These two events activate ezrin, enabling it to couple transmembrane proteins to the actin cytoskeleton, which could represent a mechanism by which podocyte foot processes form to enable renal filtration.

== Clinical relevance ==
Two human families with loss-of-function CLIC5 mutations have been reported, with a total of 5 affected individuals. CLIC5 deficiency results in progressive hearing loss by the second decade, vestibular abnormalities, and kidney dysfunction.

CLIC5A deficiency in mouse models potentiates glomerular injury in hypertension. In these mice, podocyte foot processes were also more sparse and disperse than in wild-type mice.

== See also ==
- Chloride channel
