= TTYH3 =

Protein-coding gene in the species Homo sapiens

Identifiers
- Aliases: TTYH3, tweety family member 3
- External IDs: OMIM: 608919; MGI: 1925589; HomoloGene: 18431; GeneCards: TTYH3; OMA:TTYH3 - orthologs

Gene location (Human)
Chr.	Chromosome 7 (human)
Band	7p22.3	Start	2,631,986 bp
Band	7p22.3	End	2,664,802 bp

Gene location (Mouse)
Chr.	Chromosome 5 (mouse)
Band	5|5 G2	Start	140,606,333 bp
Band	5|5 G2	End	140,634,786 bp
RNA expression pattern
Bgee	Human / Mouse (ortholog); Top expressed in: ventricular zone; ganglionic eminence; stromal cell of endometrium; right hemisphere of cerebellum; monocyte; right frontal lobe; mucosa of ileum; prefrontal cortex; granulocyte; cingulate gyrus / Top expressed in: ventricular zone; superior frontal gyrus; external carotid artery; internal carotid artery; primary visual cortex; piriform cortex; molar; genital tubercle; hand; mesenteric lymph nodes; More reference expression data
BioGPS	n/a
Gene ontology
Molecular function	chloride channel activity; intracellular calcium activated chloride channel activity; volume-sensitive chloride channel activity
Cellular component	integral component of membrane; plasma membrane; extracellular exosome; membrane; chloride channel complex
Biological process	ion transmembrane transport; chloride transport; ion transport; chloride transmembrane transport; transport
Sources:Amigo / QuickGO
Orthologs
Species	Human	Mouse
Entrez	80727	78339
Ensembl	ENSG00000136295	ENSMUSG00000036565
UniProt	Q9C0H2	Q6P5F7
RefSeq (mRNA)	NM_025250	NM_175274; NM_001308039; NM_001308040
RefSeq (protein)	NP_079526	NP_001294969; NP_780483
Location (UCSC)	Chr 7: 2.63 – 2.66 Mb	Chr 5: 140.61 – 140.63 Mb
PubMed search
- Wikidata
View/Edit Human	View/Edit Mouse

Tweety family member 3 is a protein that in humans is encoded by the TTYH3 gene.

== Function ==
This gene encodes a member of the tweety family of proteins. Members of this family function as chloride anion channels. The encoded protein functions as a calcium(2+)-activated large conductance chloride(-) channel. [provided by RefSeq, Jul 2008].
