= Peripherin 2 =

Protein-coding gene in the species Homo sapiens

PRPH2

Identifiers
- Aliases: PRPH2, AOFMD, AVMD, CACD2, DS, PRPH, RDS, RP7, TSPAN22, rd2, MDBS1, Peripherin 2, peripherin 2 (retinal degeneration, slow)
- External IDs: OMIM: 179605; MGI: 102791; GeneCards: PRPH2

Gene location (Human)
Chr.	Chromosome 6 (human)
Band	6p21.1	Start	42,696,598 bp
Band	6p21.1	End	42,722,597 bp

Gene location (Mouse)
Chr.	Chromosome 17 (mouse)
Band	17 C|17 22.91 cM	Start	47,221,385 bp
Band	17 C|17 22.91 cM	End	47,235,859 bp
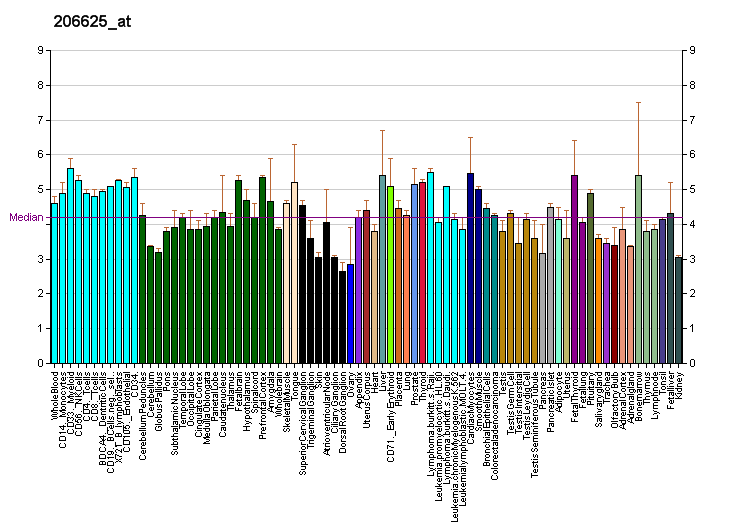
RNA expression pattern
Bgee	Human / Mouse (ortholog); Top expressed in: quadriceps femoris muscle; vastus lateralis muscle; muscle of thigh; deltoid muscle; testicle; gastrocnemius muscle; gonad; muscle of arm; biceps brachii; Skeletal muscle tissue of biceps brachii / Top expressed in: neural layer of retina; epithelium of lens; retinal pigment epithelium; embryo; outer nuclear layer; pineal gland; nucleus of stria terminalis; spermatid; More reference expression data
BioGPS	More reference expression data
Orthologs
Databases	NCBI: entry; OMA: entry
Species	Human	Mouse
Entrez	5961	19133
Ensembl	ENSG00000112619	ENSMUSG00000023978
UniProt	P23942	P15499
RefSeq (mRNA)	NM_000322	NM_008938
RefSeq (protein)	NP_000313	NP_032964
Location (UCSC)	Chr 6: 42.7 – 42.72 Mb	Chr 17: 47.22 – 47.24 Mb
PubMed search
- Wikidata
View/Edit Human	View/Edit Mouse

Peripherin-2 is a protein, that in humans is encoded by the PRPH2 gene. Peripherin-2 is found in the rod and cone cells of the retina of the eye. Defects in this protein result in one form of retinitis pigmentosa, an incurable blindness.

Mutations in the PRPH2 gene are associated with Vitelliform macular dystrophy.

== Function ==
The protein encoded by this gene is a member of the transmembrane 4 superfamily, also known as the tetraspanin family. Most of these members are cell-surface proteins that are characterized by the presence of four transmembrane helices. Tetraspanins mediate signal transduction events that play a role in the regulation of cell development, activation, growth and motility.

Peripherin 2 (sometimes referred to as peripherin/RDS or simply RDS) is a cell surface glycoprotein found in the outer segment of both rod and cone photoreceptor cells. It is located in the rim regions of the flattened disks that contain rhodopsin, which is the protein that is responsible for initiation of visual phototransduction upon reception of light. Peripherin 2 may function as an adhesion molecule involved in stabilization and compaction of outer segment disks or in the maintenance of the curvature of the rim. This protein is essential for disk morphogenesis.

== Clinical significance ==
Defects in this gene are associated with both central and peripheral retinal degenerations. Some of the various phenotypically different disorders are autosomal dominant retinitis pigmentosa, progressive macular degeneration, macular dystrophy and retinitis pigmentosa digenic.
