= CLCA3 =

Protein-coding gene in humans

CLCA3P

Identifiers
- Aliases: CLCA3P, CLCA3, chloride channel accessory 3, pseudogene
- External IDs: OMIM: 604337; GeneCards: CLCA3P

Gene location (Human)
| Chr. | Chromosome 1 (human) |
| Band | 1p22.3 | Start | 86,634,273 bp |
| Band | 1p22.3 | End | 86,655,376 bp |
Gene ontology
| Molecular function | voltage-gated ion channel activity; chloride channel activity; calcium channel activity; transporter activity; metalloendopeptidase activity |
| Cellular component | extracellular region; plasma membrane; chloride channel complex; extracellular space |
| Biological process | calcium ion transport; ion transmembrane transport; regulation of ion transmembrane transport; chloride transport; chloride transmembrane transport; ion transport; calcium ion transmembrane transport; proteolysis |
Sources:Amigo / QuickGO
Orthologs
| Databases | NCBI: entry; OMA: entry |
| Species | Human | Mouse |
| Entrez | 9629 | n/a |
| Ensembl | ENSG00000153923 | n/a |
| UniProt | Q9Y6N3 | n/a |
| RefSeq (mRNA) | NM_004921 | n/a |
| RefSeq (protein) | n/a | n/a |
| Location (UCSC) | Chr 1: 86.63 – 86.66 Mb | n/a |
| PubMed search | | n/a |
- Wikidata
| View/Edit Human |

Chloride channel accessory 3, also known as CLCA3, is a protein which in humans is encoded by the CLCA3P pseudogene. The protein encoded by this gene is a chloride channel. According to the HGNC, this protein is not expressed in humans but is in certain other species such as mouse. However, some conflicting reports state that human cells produce and glycosylate this protein.

== Function ==
This gene is a transcribed pseudogene belonging to the calcium sensitive chloride conductance protein family. To date, all members of this gene family map to the same site on chromosome 1p31-p22 and share high degrees of homology in size, sequence and predicted structure, but differ significantly in their tissue distributions. This gene contains several nonsense codons compared to other family members that render the transcript a candidate for nonsense-mediated mRNA decay (NMD), although this gene is translated into a well characterized protein which has been shown to decorate mucin granule containing vesicles. Protein structure prediction methods suggest the N-terminal region of CLCA3 protein is a zinc metalloprotease, and the protein is not an ion channel per se.

== See also ==
- Chloride channel
