= Intracellular pH =

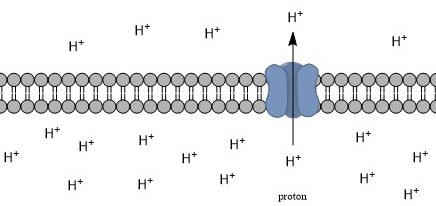
pH gradient across a membrane, with protons traveling through a transporter embedded in the membrane.

Intracellular pH (pH_{i}) is the measure of the acidity or basicity (i.e., pH) of intracellular fluid. The pH_{i} plays a critical role in membrane transport and other intracellular processes. In an environment with the improper pH_{i}, biological cells may have compromised function. Therefore, pH_{i} is closely regulated in order to ensure proper cellular function, controlled cell growth, and normal cellular processes. The mechanisms that regulate pH_{i} are usually considered to be plasma membrane transporters of which two main types exist — those that are dependent and those that are independent of the concentration of bicarbonate (HCO^{−}_{3}). Physiologically normal intracellular pH is most commonly between 7.0 and 7.4, though there is variability between tissues (e.g., mammalian skeletal muscle tends to have a pH_{i} of 6.8–7.1). There is also pH variation across different organelles, which can span from around 4.5 to 8.0. pH_{i} can be measured in a number of different ways.

== Homeostasis ==
Intracellular pH is typically lower than extracellular pH due to lower concentrations of HCO_{3}^{−}. A rise of extracellular (e.g., serum) partial pressure of carbon dioxide (pCO_{2}) above 45 mmHg leads to formation of carbonic acid, which causes a decrease of pH_{i} as it dissociates:

H_{2}O + CO_{2} ⇌ H_{2}CO_{3} ⇌ H^{+} + HCO_{3}^{–}

Since biological cells contain fluid that can act as a buffer, pH_{i} can be maintained fairly well within a certain range. Cells adjust their pH_{i} accordingly upon an increase in acidity or basicity, usually with the help of CO_{2} or HCO_{3}^{–} sensors present in the membrane of the cell. These sensors can permit H+ to pass through the cell membrane accordingly, allowing for pH_{i} to be interrelated with extracellular pH in this respect.

Major intracellular buffer systems include those involving proteins or phosphates. Since the proteins have acidic and basic regions, they can serve as both proton donors or acceptors in order to maintain a relatively stable intracellular pH. In the case of a phosphate buffer, substantial quantities of weak acid and conjugate weak base (H_{2}PO_{4}^{–} and HPO_{4}^{2–}) can accept or donate protons accordingly in order to conserve intracellular pH:

OH^{–} + H_{2}PO_{4}^{–} ⇌ H_{2}O + HPO_{4}^{2–}
H^{+} + HPO_{4}^{2–} ⇌ H_{2}PO_{4}^{–}

== In organelles ==
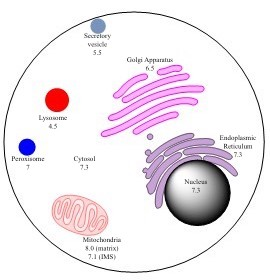
Approximate pHs of various organelles within a cell.

The pH within a particular organelle is tailored for its specific function.

For example, lysosomes have a relatively low pH of 4.5. Additionally, fluorescence microscopy techniques have indicated that phagosomes also have a relatively low internal pH. Since these are both degradative organelles that engulf and break down other substances, they require high internal acidity in order to successfully perform their intended function.

In contrast to the relatively low pH inside lysosomes and phagosomes, the mitochondrial matrix has an internal pH of around 8.0, which is approximately 0.9 pH units higher than that of inside intermembrane space. Since oxidative phosphorylation must occur inside the mitochondria, this pH discrepancy is necessary to create a gradient across the membrane. This membrane potential is ultimately what allows for the mitochondria to generate large quantities of ATP.

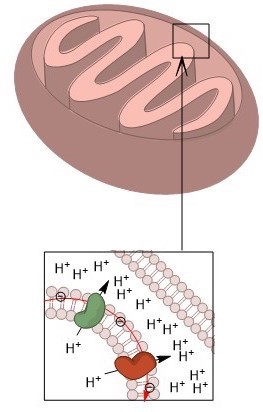
Protons being pumped from the mitochondrial matrix into the intermembrane space as the electron transport chain runs, lowering the pH of the intermembrane space.

== Measurement ==
There are several common ways in which intracellular pH (pH_{i}) can be measured including with a microelectrode, dye that is sensitive to pH, or with nuclear magnetic resonance techniques. For measuring pH inside of organelles, a technique utilizing pH-sensitive green fluorescent proteins (GFPs) may be used.

Overall, all three methods have their own advantages and disadvantages. Using dyes is perhaps the easiest and fairly precise, while NMR presents the challenge of being relatively less precise. Furthermore, using a microelectrode may be challenging in situations where the cells are too small, or the intactness of the cell membrane should remain undisturbed. GFPs are unique in that they provide a noninvasive way of determining pH inside different organelles, yet this method is not the most quantitatively precise way of determining pH.

=== Microelectrode ===
The microelectrode method for measuring pH_{i} consists of placing a very small electrode into the cell's cytosol by making a very small hole in the plasma membrane of the cell. Since the microelectrode has fluid with a high H+ concentration inside, relative to the outside of the electrode, there is a potential created due to the pH discrepancy between the inside and outside of the electrode. From this voltage difference, and a predetermined pH for the fluid inside the electrode, one can determine the intracellular pH (pH_{i}) of the cell of interest.

=== Fluorescence spectroscopy ===
Another way to measure Intracellular pH (pH_{i}) is with dyes that are sensitive to pH, and fluoresce differently at various pH values. This technique, which makes use of fluorescence spectroscopy, consists of adding this special dye to the cytosol of a cell. By exciting the dye in the cell with energy from light, and measuring the wavelength of light released by the photon as it returns to its native energy state, one can determine the type of dye present, and relate that to the intracellular pH of the given cell.

=== Nuclear magnetic resonance ===
In addition to using pH-sensitive electrodes and dyes to measure pH_{i}, Nuclear Magnetic Resonance (NMR) spectroscopy can also be used to quantify pH_{i}. NMR, typically speaking, reveals information about the inside of a cell by placing the cell in an environment with a potent magnetic field. Based on the ratio between the concentrations of protonated, compared to deprotonated, forms of phosphate compounds in a given cell, the internal pH of the cell can be determined. Additionally, NMR may also be used to reveal the presence of intracellular sodium, which can also provide information about the pH_{i}.

Using NMR Spectroscopy, it has been determined that lymphocytes maintain a constant internal pH of 7.17± 0.06, though, like all cells, the intracellular pH changes in the same direction as extracellular pH.

=== pH-sensitive GFPs ===
To determine the pH inside organelles, pH-sensitive GFPs are often used as part of a noninvasive and effective technique. By using cDNA as a template along with the appropriate primers, the GFP gene can be expressed in the cytosol, and the proteins produced can target specific regions within the cell, such as the mitochondria, golgi apparatus, cytoplasm, and endoplasmic reticulum. If certain GFP mutants that are highly sensitive to pH in intracellular environments are used in these experiments, the relative amount of resulting fluorescence can reveal the approximate surrounding pH.
