= Chromosome 6 =

Human chromosome

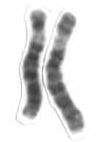
- Human chromosome 6 pair after G-banding. One is from mother, one is from father.

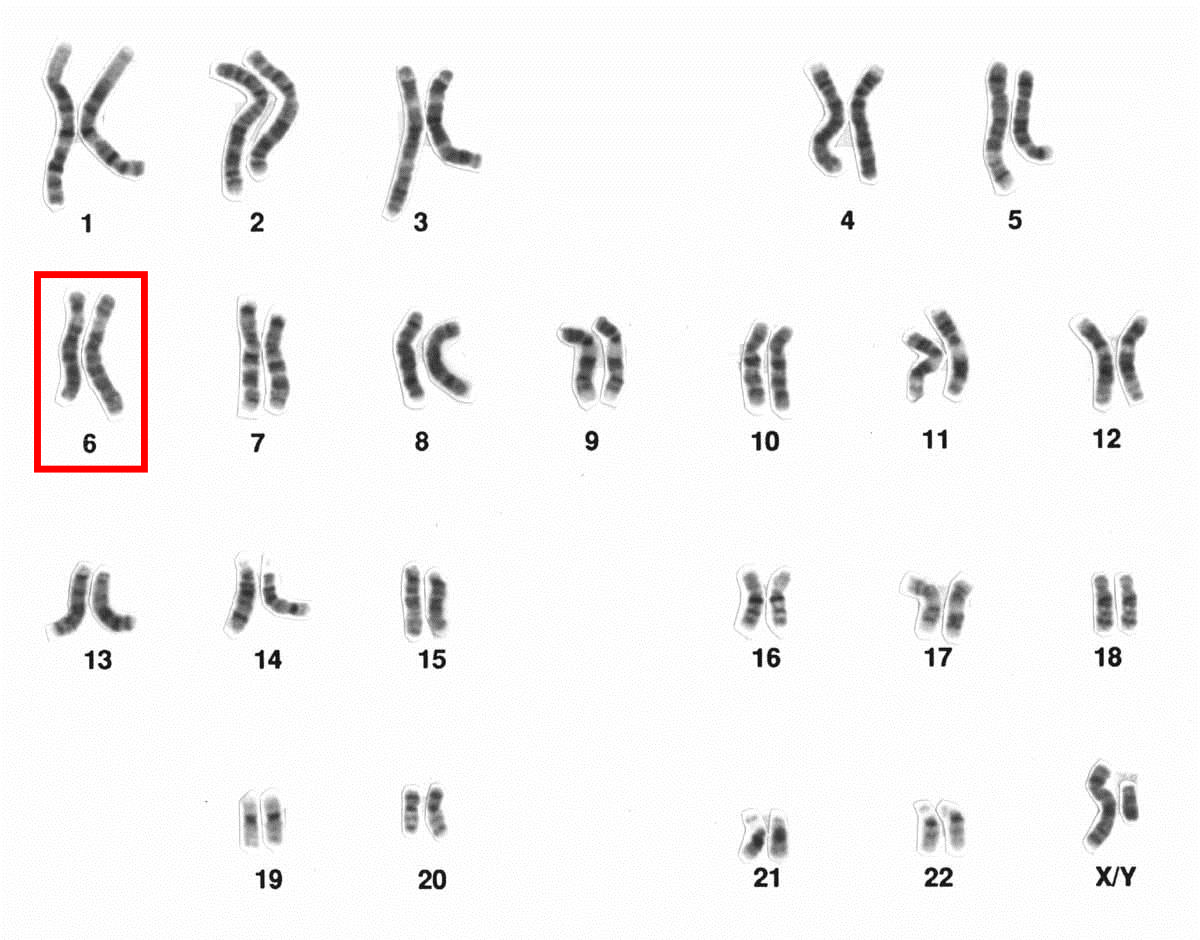
- Chromosome 6 pair in human male karyogram

Features
- Length (bp): 172,126,628 bp (CHM13)
- No. of genes: 996 (CCDS)
- Type: Autosome
- Centromere position: Submetacentric (59.8 Mbp)

Complete gene lists
- CCDS: Gene list
- HGNC: Gene list
- UniProt: Gene list
- NCBI: Gene list

External map viewers
- Ensembl: Chromosome 6
- Entrez: Chromosome 6
- NCBI: Chromosome 6
- UCSC: Chromosome 6

Full DNA sequences
- RefSeq: NC_000006 (FASTA)
- GenBank: CM000668 (FASTA)

Chromosome 6 is one of the 23 pairs of chromosomes in humans. People normally have two copies of this chromosome. Chromosome 6 spans nearly 171 million base pairs (the building material of DNA) and represents 5.5–6% of the total DNA in cells. It contains the major histocompatibility complex, which contains over 132 genes related to the immune response, and plays a vital role in organ transplantation.

== The evolution of human centromere 6 ==
The centromere of chromosome 6 illustrates an interesting example of centromere evolution. It was known that in a Catarrhini ancestor the chromosome 6 centromere was situated near position 28 Mb of the modern human chromosome. In Macaca mulatta, this old centromere went defunct and repositioned to a different chromosomal location. In the case of humans, the old centromere went defunct and a more recent form emerged near the modern position of human cen6 (size of 60 Mb). Such cases are known as Evolutionary New Centromeres (ENC). This assembly phenomenon of the human chromosome 6 gives researchers an opportunity to investigate the origin of the ENC on chromosome 6.

== Genes ==
The human leukocyte antigen lies on chromosome 6, with the exception of the gene for β2-microglobulin (which is located on chromosome 15), and encodes cell-surface antigen-presenting proteins among other functions.

=== Number of genes ===
In 2003, the entirety of chromosome 6 was manually annotated for proteins, resulting in the identification of 1,557 genes, and 633 pseudogenes.

The following are some of the newer gene count estimates. Because researchers use different approaches to genome annotation their predictions of the number of genes on each chromosome varies (for technical details, see gene prediction). Among various projects, the collaborative consensus coding sequence project (CCDS) takes an extremely conservative strategy. So CCDS's gene number prediction represents a lower bound on the total number of human protein-coding genes.

| Estimated by | Protein-coding genes | Non-coding RNA genes | Pseudogenes | Source | Release date |
|---|---|---|---|---|---|
| CCDS | 996 | — | — | | 2016-09-08 |
| HGNC | 1,007 | 422 | 736 | | 2017-05-12 |
| Ensembl | 1,038 | 985 | 800 | | 2017-03-29 |
| UniProt | 1,111 | — | — | | 2018-02-28 |
| NCBI | 1,053 | 1,188 | 911 | | 2017-05-19 |

=== Gene list ===
The following is a partial list of genes on human chromosome 6.

==== p-arm ====
The following are some of the genes located on p-arm (short arm) of human chromosome 6:

- ADTRP: encoding protein Androgen-dependent TFPI-regulating protein
- APOM: encoding protein Apolipoprotein M (6p21.33)
- ARMC12: encoding protein Armadillo repeat containing 12
- ATXN1: encoding protein Ataxin 1 (6p16.3-p16.76)
- TSBP1: encoding protein TSBP1 (6p21.32)
- C6orf62: chromosome 6 open reading frame 62 (6p22.3)
- C6orf89: chromosome 6 open reading frame 89 (6p21.2)
- CDKAL1: CDK5 regulatory subunit associated protein 1 like 1 (6p22.3)
- COL11A2: collagen, type XI, alpha 2(6p21.3)
- CRIP3: encoding protein Cysteine rich protein 3
- CYP21A2: cytochrome P450, family 21, subfamily A, polypeptide 2 (6p21.33)
- DHX16: DEAH-box helicase 16 (6p21.33)
- DOM3Z: Decapping exoribonuclease (6p21.33)
- DSP: Desmoplakin gene linked to cardiomyopathy (6p24.3)
- ELOVL5: ELOVL fatty acid elongase 5 (6p12.1)
- FBXO9: F-box protein 9 (6p12.1)
- FOXP4-AS1: encoding protein FOXP4 antisense RNA 1
- FTH1P5: encoding protein Ferritin, heavy polypeptide 1 pseudogene 5
- G6B: Protein G6b (6p21.33)
- GCNT2: N-acetyllactosaminide beta-1,6-N-acetylglucosaminyl-transferase (6p24.3)
- GGNBP1: encoding protein Gametogenetin binding protein 1 (pseudogene)
- GMDS: GDP-mannose 4,6-dehydratase (6p25.3)
- GTPBP2: encoding protein Gtp binding protein 2
- HCG4P11: HLA complex group 4 pseudogene 11
- HFE: hemochromatosis (6p22.2)
- HIST1H2AH: histone cluster 1 H2A family member h (6p22.1)
- HLA-A, HLA-B, HLA-C: major histocompatibility complex (MHC), class I, A, B, and C loci. (6p21.3)
- HLA-DQA1 and HLA-DQB1 form HLA-DQ heterodimer MHC class II, DQ: Celiac1, IDDM (6p21.3)
- HLA-DRA, HLA-DRB1, HLA-DRB3, HLA-DRB4, HLA-DRB5 forms HLA-DR, heterodimer MHC class II, DR (6p21.3) Mold / Biotoxin Susceptibility
- HLA-DPA1 and HLA-DPB1 forms HLA-DP, MHC class II, DP (6p21.3)
- HLA-Cw*06:02: gene variation related to psoriasis (6p21.3)
- KAAG1: encoding protein Kidney associated antigen 1
- LOC100533655: encoding protein Aryl hydrocarbon receptor pseudogene
- LST1: leukocyte specific transcript 1 (6p21.33)
- LY6G6E encoding protein Lymphocyte antigen 6 complex, locus G6E (pseudogene) (6p21.33)
- MIR4640: microRNA 4640 (6p21.33)
- MLIP: muscular LMNA interaction protein (6p12.1)
- MRPS18B: mitochondrial ribosomal protein S18B (6p21.33)
- MUT: methylmalonyl Coenzyme A mutase (6p12.3)
- NHLRC1: NHL repeat containing E3 ubiquitin protein ligase 1 (6p22.3)
- NOL7: nucleolar protein 7 (6p23)
- NQO2: N-ribosyldihydronicotinamide:quinone reductase 2 (6p25.2)
- NRSN1: neurensin 1 (6p22.3)
- NUDT3: nudix hydrolase 3 (6p21.31)
- PFDN6: prefoldin subunit 6 (6p21.32)
- PHACTR1: phosphatase and actin regulator 1 (6p24.1)
- PKHD1: polycystic kidney and hepatic disease 1 (autosomal recessive) (6p21.2-p12)
- PRICKLE4: prickle planar cell polarity protein 4 (6p21.1)
- PRSS16: protease, serine 16 (6p22.1)
- PSMB8-AS1: PSMB8 antisense RNA 1 (head to head) (6p21.32)
- RAB44: encoding protein Rab44, member ras oncogene family
- RIPOR2: RHO family interacting cell polarization regulator 2 (6p22.3)
- RPL10A: encoding protein 60S ribosomal protein L10a (6p21.31)
- SKIV2L: Ski2 like RNA helicase (6p21.33)
- SSR1: signal sequence receptor subunit 1 (6p24.3)
- TCF19: transcription factor 19 (6p21.33)
- TCP11: t-complex 11 (6p21.31)
- TJAP1: tight junction associated protein 1 (6p21.1)
- TP53COR1 encoding protein Tumor protein p53 pathway corepressor 1 (non-protein coding)
- TMEM151B: encoding protein Transmembrane protein 151B
- TNXB: tenascin XB (6p21.3)
- TRAM2: translocation associated membrane protein 2 (6p12.2)
- TRIM38: encoding protein Tripartite motif containing 38
- TTBK1: encoding protein Tau tubulin kinase 1
- UBR2: ubiquitin protein ligase E3 component n-recognin 2 (6p21.2)
- UNC5CL: encoding protein Unc-5 homolog C (C. elegans)-like
- USP8P1: encoding protein Ubiquitin specific peptidase 8 pseudogene 1
- VEGF: vascular endothelial growth factor A (angiogenic growth factor) (6p21.1)
- VPS52: GARP complex subunit
- VWA7: encoding protein Von willebrand factor a domain containing 7
- ZKSCAN4: encoding protein zinc finger with KRAB and SCAN domains 4
- ZNF76: zinc finger protein 76 (6p21.31)
- ZNF193: zinc finger protein 193 (6p22.1)
- ZNRD1: zinc ribbon domain containing 1 (6p22.1)

==== q-arm ====
The following are some of the genes located on q-arm (long arm) of human chromosome 6:

- AIM1: encoding protein Absent in melanoma 1 protein (6q21)
- AIG1: encoding protein Androgen-induced protein 1 (6q24.2)
- AKIRIN2: akirin 2 (6q15)
- ARG1: arginase 1 (6q23.2)
- BCKDHB: branched-chain keto acid dehydrogenase E1, beta polypeptide (maple syrup urine disease) (6q14.1)
- BMIQ3: body mass index QTL 3
- TMEM242 encoding transmembrane protein TMEM242
- C6orf203: encoding protein Chromosome 6 open reading frame 203
- C6orf58: chromosome 6 open reading frame 58 (6q22.33)
- CFAP206: encoding protein Cilia And Flagella Associated Protein 206
- CLSV2: encoding protein (6q22.31)
- CMD1F: cardiomyopathy, dilated 1F
- CMD1K: cardiomyopathy, dilated 1K
- CNR1: cannabinoid 1 receptor (6q14-q15)
- DACT2: encoding protein Dishevelled binding antagonist of beta catenin 2
- DFNB38: deafness, autosomal recessive 38
- DYX4: dyslexia susceptibility 4
- ECT2L: encoding protein Epithelial cell transforming sequence 2 oncogene-like
- ESR1: Estrogen receptor 1 (6q25)
- EYA4: eyes absent homolog 4 (Drosophila)(6q23.2)
- FBXL4: F-box and leucine rich repeat protein 4 (6q16.1-q16.2)
- FEB5: febrile convulsions 5
- HACE1: HECT domain and Ankyrin repeat containing, E3 ubiquitin protein ligase 1 (6q21)
- HEBP2: heme binding protein 2 (6q24.1)
- IDDM8: insulin dependent diabetes mellitus 8
- IDDM15: insulin dependent diabetes mellitus 15
- IFNGR: interferon-γ receptor gene (6q23-q24)
- IGF2R: insulin-like growth factor 2 receptor (6q25.3)
- IMPG1: interphotoreceptor matrix proteoglylcan 1 (6q14.1)
- KIAA0408
- LGSN: encoding protein lengsin
- LIN28B: lin-28 homolog B (6q16.3-q21)
- MAN1A1: mannosidase alpha class 1A member 1 (6q22.31)
- MB21D1: encoding protein Mab-21 domain containing 1
- MCDR1: macular dystrophy, retinal, 1
- MDN1: midasin AAA ATPase 1 (6q15)
- MOXD1: monooxygenase DBH like 1 (6q23.2)
- MTO1: mitochondrial tRNA translation optimization 1 (6q13)
- MRT18: mental retardation, non-syndromic, autosomal recessive
- MRT28: mental retardation, non-syndromic, autosomal recessive
- MTRF1L: mitochondrial translational release factor 1 like (6q25.2)
- MYO6: myosin VI (6q14.1)
- NHEG1: encoding protein Neuroblastoma highly expressed 1
- OA3: ocular albinism 3
- OPRM1: μ-opioid receptors (6q24-q25)
- OTSC7: otosclerosis 7
- PLG: plasminogen (6q26)
- PBCRA1
- PARK2: Parkinson disease (autosomal recessive, juvenile) 2, parkin (6q26)
- PCMT1: protein-L-isoaspartate (D-aspartate) O-methyltransferase (6q25.1)
- PERP: p53 apoptosis effector related to PMP-22 (6q23.3)
- PKIB: cAMP-dependent protein kinase inhibitor beta (6p22.31)
- PLAGL1: (6q24.2)
- QRSL1: encoding protein Glutaminyl-trna synthase (glutamine-hydrolyzing)-like 1
- RCD1: retinal cone dystrophy 1
- RFPL4B: Ret finger protein like 4B
- RP63: retinitis pigmentosa 63
- SASH1: SAM and SH3 domain containing 1 (6q24.3-q25.1)
- SCZD5: schizophrenia disorder 5
- SEN6: senescence (cellular)-related 6
- SENP6: SUMO1/sentrin specific peptidase 6 (6q14.1)
- SERAC1: serine active site containing 1 (6q25.3)
- SERINC1: serine incorporator 1 (6q22.31)
- SF3B5: splicing factor 3b subunit 5 (6q24.2)
- SMAP1: small ArfGAP 1 (6q13)
- SOBP: sine oculis binding protein homolog (6q21)
- SPG25: spastic paraplegia 25
- SYNJ2: synaptojanin 2 (6q25.3)
- T: T brachyury transcription factor (more commonly known as the T gene) linked to Hepatocellular carcinoma and Chordoma (6q27)
- TAAR1: trace amine associated receptor 1 (6q23.1)
- TAAR2: trace amine associated receptor 2 (6q24)
- TMEM200A: encoding protein Transmembrane protein 200A
- TSPYL1: TSPY like 1 (6q22.1)
- UNC93A: encoding protein Unc-93 homolog A (C. elegans)
- VNN1: vanin 1 (6q23.2)
- VNN2: vanin 2 (6q23.2)
- VTA1: Vesicle trafficking 1 (6q24.1-2)
- ZC2HC1: encoding protein Zinc finger C2HC-type containing 1B
- ZDHHC14: encoding protein Zinc finger, DHHC-type containing 14

== Diseases and disorders ==
The following diseases are some of those related to genes on chromosome 6:

- ankylosing spondylitis, HLA-B
- collagenopathy, types II and XI
- Coeliac disease HLA-DQA1 and DQB1
- Ehlers–Danlos syndrome, classical, hypermobility, and Tenascin-X types
- Hashimoto's thyroiditis
- hemochromatosis
- Hemochromatosis type 1
- 21-hydroxylase deficiency
- maple syrup urine disease
- methylmalonic acidemia
- Autosomal nonsyndromic deafness
- Narcolepsy
- North Carolina macular dystrophy
- otospondylomegaepiphyseal dysplasia
- Parkinson disease
- polycystic kidney disease
- porphyria
- porphyria cutanea tarda
- Rheumatoid arthritis, HLA-DR
- CIRS (Chronic Inflammatory Response Syndrome), Sick Building Syndrome, Mold Toxin Susceptibility / Poisoning, HLA-DR/DQ
- Spinocerebellar ataxia type 1, ATXN1
- Stickler syndrome, COL11A2
- Systemic lupus erythematosus
- Diabetes mellitus type 1, HLA-DR, DQA1 & DQB1
- X-linked sideroblastic anemia
- Epilepsy
- Guillain–Barré syndrome
- Chordoma
- Hepatocellular carcinoma
- Schizophrenia

== Cytogenetic band ==
G-banding ideograms of human chromosome 6

G-banding ideogram of human chromosome 6 in resolution 850 bphs. Band length in this diagram is proportional to base-pair length. This type of ideogram is generally used in genome browsers (e.g. Ensembl, UCSC Genome Browser).

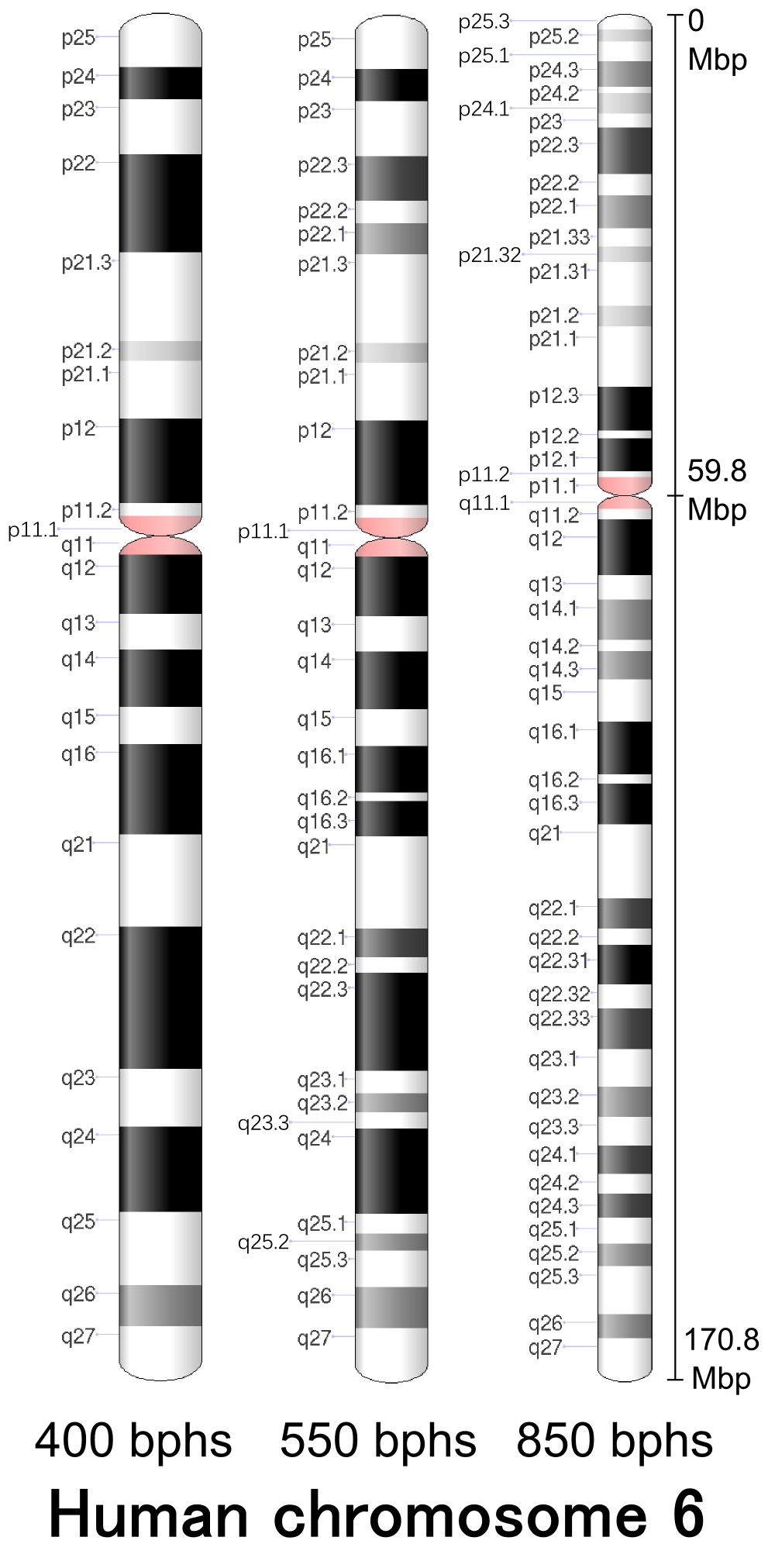
G-banding patterns of human chromosome 6 in three different resolutions (400, 550 and 850). Band length in this diagram is based on the ideograms from ISCN (2013). This type of ideogram represents actual relative band length observed under a microscope at the different moments during the mitotic process.

G-bands of human chromosome 6 in resolution 850 bphs
| Chr. | Arm | Band | ISCN start | ISCN stop | Basepair start | Basepair stop | Stain | Density |
|---|---|---|---|---|---|---|---|---|
| 6 | p | 25.3 | 0 | 118 | 1 | 2,300,000 | gneg | |
| 6 | p | 25.2 | 118 | 207 | 2,300,001 | 4,200,000 | gpos | 25 |
| 6 | p | 25.1 | 207 | 355 | 4,200,001 | 7,100,000 | gneg | |
| 6 | p | 24.3 | 355 | 548 | 7,100,001 | 10,600,000 | gpos | 50 |
| 6 | p | 24.2 | 548 | 592 | 10,600,001 | 11,600,000 | gneg | |
| 6 | p | 24.1 | 592 | 740 | 11,600,001 | 13,400,000 | gpos | 25 |
| 6 | p | 23 | 740 | 844 | 13,400,001 | 15,200,000 | gneg | |
| 6 | p | 22.3 | 844 | 1185 | 15,200,001 | 25,200,000 | gpos | 75 |
| 6 | p | 22.2 | 1185 | 1348 | 25,200,001 | 27,100,000 | gneg | |
| 6 | p | 22.1 | 1348 | 1585 | 27,100,001 | 30,500,000 | gpos | 50 |
| 6 | p | 21.33 | 1585 | 1718 | 30,500,001 | 32,100,000 | gneg | |
| 6 | p | 21.32 | 1718 | 1836 | 32,100,001 | 33,500,000 | gpos | 25 |
| 6 | p | 21.31 | 1836 | 2162 | 33,500,001 | 36,600,000 | gneg | |
| 6 | p | 21.2 | 2162 | 2310 | 36,600,001 | 40,500,000 | gpos | 25 |
| 6 | p | 21.1 | 2310 | 2755 | 40,500,001 | 46,200,000 | gneg | |
| 6 | p | 12.3 | 2755 | 3080 | 46,200,001 | 51,800,000 | gpos | 100 |
| 6 | p | 12.2 | 3080 | 3140 | 51,800,001 | 53,000,000 | gneg | |
| 6 | p | 12.1 | 3140 | 3377 | 5,300,0001 | 57,200,000 | gpos | 100 |
| 6 | p | 11.2 | 3377 | 3421 | 57,200,001 | 58,500,000 | gneg | |
| 6 | p | 11.1 | 3421 | 3554 | 58,500,001 | 59,800,000 | acen | |
| 6 | q | 11.1 | 3554 | 3658 | 59,800,001 | 62,600,000 | acen | |
| 6 | q | 11.2 | 3658 | 3732 | 62,600,001 | 62,700,000 | gneg | |
| 6 | q | 12 | 3732 | 4147 | 62,700,001 | 69,200,000 | gpos | 100 |
| 6 | q | 13 | 4147 | 4324 | 69,200,001 | 75,200,000 | gneg | |
| 6 | q | 14.1 | 4324 | 4621 | 75,200,001 | 83,200,000 | gpos | 50 |
| 6 | q | 14.2 | 4621 | 4709 | 83,200,001 | 84,200,000 | gneg | |
| 6 | q | 14.3 | 4709 | 4917 | 84,200,001 | 87,300,000 | gpos | 50 |
| 6 | q | 15 | 4917 | 5228 | 87,300,001 | 92,500,000 | gneg | |
| 6 | q | 16.1 | 5228 | 5613 | 92,500,001 | 98,900,000 | gpos | 100 |
| 6 | q | 16.2 | 5613 | 5687 | 98,900,001 | 100,000,000 | gneg | |
| 6 | q | 16.3 | 5687 | 5983 | 10,000,0001 | 105,000,000 | gpos | 100 |
| 6 | q | 21 | 5983 | 6531 | 10,500,0001 | 114,200,000 | gneg | |
| 6 | q | 22.1 | 6531 | 6753 | 114,200,001 | 117,900,000 | gpos | 75 |
| 6 | q | 22.2 | 6753 | 6872 | 117,900,001 | 118,100,000 | gneg | |
| 6 | q | 22.31 | 6872 | 7168 | 118,100,001 | 125,800,000 | gpos | 100 |
| 6 | q | 22.32 | 7168 | 7345 | 125,800,001 | 126,800,000 | gneg | |
| 6 | q | 22.33 | 7345 | 7642 | 126,800,001 | 130,000,000 | gpos | 75 |
| 6 | q | 23.1 | 7642 | 7923 | 13,000,0001 | 130,900,000 | gneg | |
| 6 | q | 23.2 | 7923 | 8145 | 130,900,001 | 134,700,000 | gpos | 50 |
| 6 | q | 23.3 | 8145 | 8352 | 134,700,001 | 138,300,000 | gneg | |
| 6 | q | 24.1 | 8352 | 8560 | 138,300,001 | 142,200,000 | gpos | 75 |
| 6 | q | 24.2 | 8560 | 8708 | 142,200,001 | 145,100,000 | gneg | |
| 6 | q | 24.3 | 8708 | 8886 | 145,100,001 | 148,500,000 | gpos | 75 |
| 6 | q | 25.1 | 8886 | 9078 | 148,500,001 | 152,100,000 | gneg | |
| 6 | q | 25.2 | 9078 | 9241 | 152,100,001 | 155,200,000 | gpos | 50 |
| 6 | q | 25.3 | 9241 | 9596 | 155,200,001 | 160,600,000 | gneg | |
| 6 | q | 26 | 9596 | 9774 | 160,600,001 | 164,100,000 | gpos | 50 |
| 6 | q | 27 | 9774 | 10100 | 164,100,001 | 170,805,979 | gneg | |
