= MIR4640 =

Identifiers
- Aliases: MIR4640, microRNA 4640
- External IDs: GeneCards: MIR4640; OMA:MIR4640 - orthologs

Gene location (Human)
Chr.	Chromosome 6 (human)
Band	6p21.33	Start	30,890,883 bp
Band	6p21.33	End	30,890,972 bp
RNA expression pattern
Bgee	Human / Mouse (ortholog); Top expressed in: gastrocnemius muscle; putamen; Brodmann area 9; left coronary artery; Descending thoracic aorta; left ventricle; smooth muscle tissue; body of stomach; human kidney; hippocampus proper / n/a; More reference expression data
BioGPS	n/a
Orthologs
Species	Human	Mouse
Entrez	100616237	n/a
Ensembl	ENSG00000284370	n/a
UniProt	n a	n/a
RefSeq (mRNA)	n/a	n/a
RefSeq (protein)	n/a	n/a
Location (UCSC)	Chr 6: 30.89 – 30.89 Mb	n/a
PubMed search		n/a
- Wikidata
View/Edit Human

MicroRNA 4640 is a non-coding RNA in humans that is encoded by the MIR4640 gene.

microRNAs (miRNAs) are short (20-24 nt) non-coding RNAs that are involved in post-transcriptional regulation of gene expression in multicellular organisms by affecting both the stability and translation of mRNAs. miRNAs are transcribed by RNA polymerase II as part of capped and polyadenylated primary transcripts (pri-miRNAs) that can be either protein-coding or non-coding. The primary transcript is cleaved by the Drosha ribonuclease III enzyme to produce an approximately 70-nt stem-loop precursor miRNA (pre-miRNA), which is further cleaved by the cytoplasmic Dicer ribonuclease to generate the mature miRNA and antisense miRNA star (miRNA*) products. The mature miRNA is incorporated into a RNA-induced silencing complex (RISC), which recognizes target mRNAs through imperfect base pairing with the miRNA and most commonly results in translational inhibition or destabilization of the target mRNA. The RefSeq represents the predicted microRNA stem-loop. [provided by RefSeq, Sep 2009].
