= C6orf89 =

Protein-coding gene in the species Homo sapiens

Identifiers
- Aliases: C6orf89, BRAP, chromosome 6 open reading frame 89, PS1TP5TP1
- External IDs: OMIM: 616642; MGI: 2136782; HomoloGene: 12728; GeneCards: C6orf89; OMA:C6orf89 - orthologs

Gene location (Human)
Chr.	Chromosome 6 (human)
Band	6p21.2	Start	36,871,870 bp
Band	6p21.2	End	36,928,964 bp

Gene location (Mouse)
Chr.	Chromosome 17 (mouse)
Band	17|17 A3.3	Start	29,268,788 bp
Band	17|17 A3.3	End	29,314,065 bp
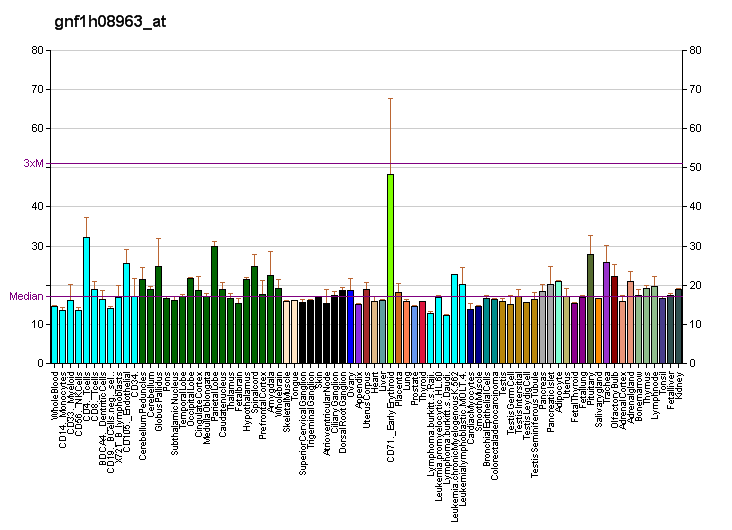
RNA expression pattern
Bgee	Human / Mouse (ortholog); Top expressed in: myocardium of left ventricle; cardiac muscle tissue of right atrium; islet of Langerhans; tendon of biceps brachii; smooth muscle tissue; corpus epididymis; stromal cell of endometrium; internal globus pallidus; pars reticulata; nipple / Top expressed in: retinal pigment epithelium; cardiac muscle tissue of left ventricle; lacrimal gland; right ventricle; epithelium of lens; right kidney; interventricular septum; fossa; aortic valve; left lobe of liver; More reference expression data
BioGPS	More reference expression data
Gene ontology
Molecular function	protein binding
Cellular component	integral component of membrane; Golgi apparatus; Golgi membrane; nucleus; plasma membrane; nucleolus; midbody; membrane; cytoplasm
Biological process	positive regulation of histone deacetylase activity; epithelial cell proliferation; wound healing; positive regulation of cell cycle
Sources:Amigo / QuickGO
Orthologs
Species	Human	Mouse
Entrez	221477	80748
Ensembl	ENSG00000198663	ENSMUSG00000052712
UniProt	Q6UWU4	Q99KU6
RefSeq (mRNA)	NM_001286635; NM_001286636; NM_001286637; NM_152734	NM_030561
RefSeq (protein)	NP_001273564; NP_001273565; NP_001273566; NP_689947; NP_001273564.1	NP_085038
Location (UCSC)	Chr 6: 36.87 – 36.93 Mb	Chr 17: 29.27 – 29.31 Mb
PubMed search
- Wikidata
View/Edit Human	View/Edit Mouse

Uncharacterized protein C6orf89 is a protein that in humans is encoded by the C6orf89 gene.
