= KAAG1 =

Protein-coding gene in the species Homo sapiens

Identifiers
- Aliases: KAAG1, RU2AS, kidney associated antigen 1, RU2 antisense gene protein, kidney associated DCDC2 antisense RNA 1
- External IDs: OMIM: 608211; GeneCards: KAAG1

Gene location (Human)
Chr.	Chromosome 6 (human)
Band	6p22.3	Start	24,356,903 bp
Band	6p22.3	End	24,358,285 bp
RNA expression pattern
Bgee	Human / Mouse (ortholog); Top expressed in: testicle; human kidney; islet of Langerhans; mucosa of transverse colon; body of pancreas; right lobe of liver; endometrium; right uterine tube; left lobe of thyroid gland; right lobe of thyroid gland / n/a; More reference expression data
BioGPS	n/a
Orthologs
Databases	NCBI: entry; OMA: entry
Species	Human	Mouse
Entrez	353219	n/a
Ensembl	ENSG00000146049	n/a
UniProt	Q9UBP8	n/a
RefSeq (mRNA)	NM_181337	n/a
RefSeq (protein)	NP_851854	n/a
Location (UCSC)	Chr 6: 24.36 – 24.36 Mb	n/a
PubMed search		n/a
- Wikidata
View/Edit Human

Kidney associated antigen 1 is a protein that in humans is encoded by the KAAG1 gene.
