= ECT2L =

Protein-coding gene in the species Homo sapiens

Identifiers
- Aliases: ECT2L, ARHGEF32, C6orf91, FBXO49, LFDH, dJ509I19.2, dJ509I19.3, dJ509I19.5, epithelial cell transforming 2 like
- External IDs: MGI: 3641723; GeneCards: ECT2L

Gene location (Human)
Chr.	Chromosome 6 (human)
Band	6q24.1	Start	138,795,911 bp
Band	6q24.1	End	138,904,070 bp

Gene location (Mouse)
Chr.	Chromosome 10 (mouse)
Band	10|10 A3	Start	18,004,651 bp
Band	10|10 A3	End	18,086,638 bp
RNA expression pattern
Bgee	Human / Mouse (ortholog); Top expressed in: right uterine tube; olfactory zone of nasal mucosa; left ventricle; right lung; Achilles tendon; pituitary gland; gonad; right auricle of heart; anterior pituitary; endometrium / Top expressed in: embryo; hypothalamus; embryo; ovary; proximal tubule; lung; right kidney; olfactory bulb; thymus; muscle tissue; More reference expression data
BioGPS	n/a
Orthologs
Databases	NCBI: entry; OMA: entry
Species	Human	Mouse
Entrez	345930	100045792
Ensembl	ENSG00000203734	ENSMUSG00000071392
UniProt	Q008S8	n/a
RefSeq (mRNA)	NM_001077706; NM_001195037	NM_001195036; NM_001370991
RefSeq (protein)	NP_001071174; NP_001181966	n/a
Location (UCSC)	Chr 6: 138.8 – 138.9 Mb	Chr 10: 18 – 18.09 Mb
PubMed search
- Wikidata
View/Edit Human	View/Edit Mouse

Epithelial cell transforming sequence 2 oncogene-like is a protein that in humans is encoded by the ECT2L gene.

== Clinical relevance ==
Recurrent mutations of this gene have been associated to cases of acute lymphoblastic leukaemia.
