= Dishevelled binding antagonist of beta catenin 2 =

Protein found in humans

DACT2

Identifiers
- Aliases: DACT2, C6orf116, DAPPER2, DPR2, bA503C24.7, dishevelled binding antagonist of beta catenin 2
- External IDs: OMIM: 608966; MGI: 1920347; HomoloGene: 18237; GeneCards: DACT2; OMA:DACT2 - orthologs

Gene location (Human)
Chr.	Chromosome 6 (human)
Band	6q27	Start	168,292,830 bp
Band	6q27	End	168,319,777 bp

Gene location (Mouse)
Chr.	Chromosome 17 (mouse)
Band	17|17 A2	Start	14,415,314 bp
Band	17|17 A2	End	14,424,566 bp
RNA expression pattern
Bgee	Human / Mouse (ortholog); Top expressed in: placenta; testicle; putamen; nucleus accumbens; caudate nucleus; apex of heart; decidua; minor salivary glands; skin of leg; skin of abdomen / Top expressed in: renal pelvis; midgut; umbilical vein; renal calyx; cervical loop; Hindgut; visual cortex; superior frontal gyrus; primary visual cortex; primary motor cortex; More reference expression data
BioGPS	n/a
Gene ontology
Molecular function	protein kinase C binding; beta-catenin binding; transcription factor binding; protein kinase A binding; delta-catenin binding
Cellular component	cytoplasm
Biological process	regulation of Wnt signaling pathway; hematopoietic progenitor cell differentiation; epithelial cell morphogenesis; negative regulation of cell adhesion; skin development; inner medullary collecting duct development; negative regulation of nodal signaling pathway
Sources:Amigo / QuickGO
Orthologs
Species	Human	Mouse
Entrez	168002	240025
Ensembl	ENSG00000164488	ENSMUSG00000048826
UniProt	Q5SW24	Q7TN08
RefSeq (mRNA)	NM_001286350; NM_001286351; NM_214462	NM_172826
RefSeq (protein)	NP_001273279; NP_001273280; NP_999627	NP_766414
Location (UCSC)	Chr 6: 168.29 – 168.32 Mb	Chr 17: 14.42 – 14.42 Mb
PubMed search
- Wikidata
View/Edit Human	View/Edit Mouse

Dishevelled binding antagonist of beta catenin 2 is a protein that in humans is encoded by the DACT2 gene.
