= UBR2 =

Protein-coding gene in the species Homo sapiens

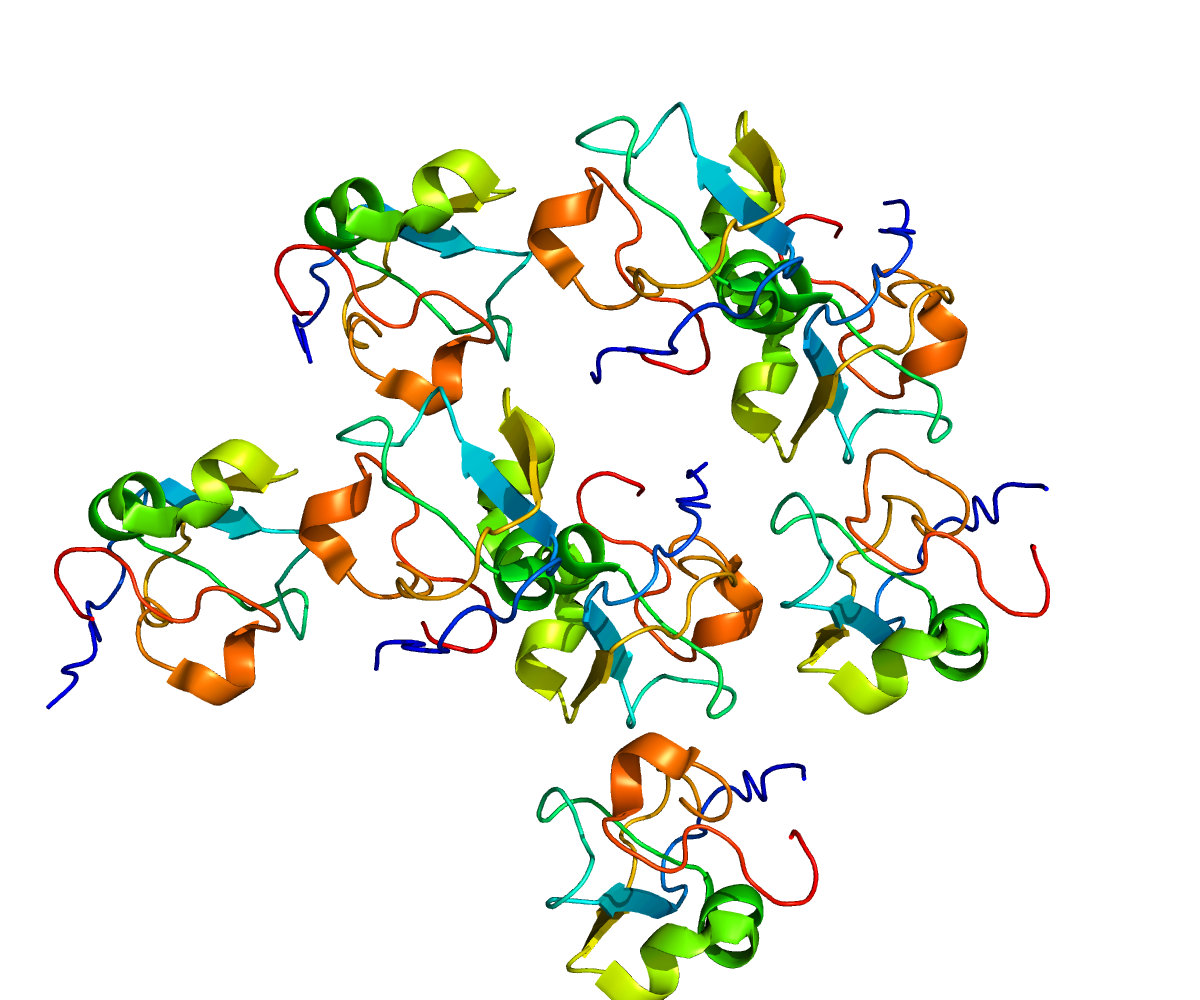

Identifiers
- Aliases: UBR2, C6orf133, bA49A4.1, dJ242G1.1, dJ392M17.3, ubiquitin protein ligase E3 component n-recognin 2
- External IDs: OMIM: 609134; MGI: 1861099; GeneCards: UBR2
Available structures
PDB	Ortholog search: PDBe RCSB
PDB	List of PDB id codes 3NY2, 3NY3
Enzyme activity
EC #	BRENDA	ExPASy	KEGG	MetaCyc
2.3.2.27	↗	↗	↗	↗

Gene location (Human)
Chr.	Chromosome 6 (human)
Band	6p21.1	Start	42,564,029 bp
Band	6p21.1	End	42,693,505 bp

Gene location (Mouse)
Chr.	Chromosome 17 (mouse)
Band	17|17 C	Start	47,239,221 bp
Band	17|17 C	End	47,321,482 bp
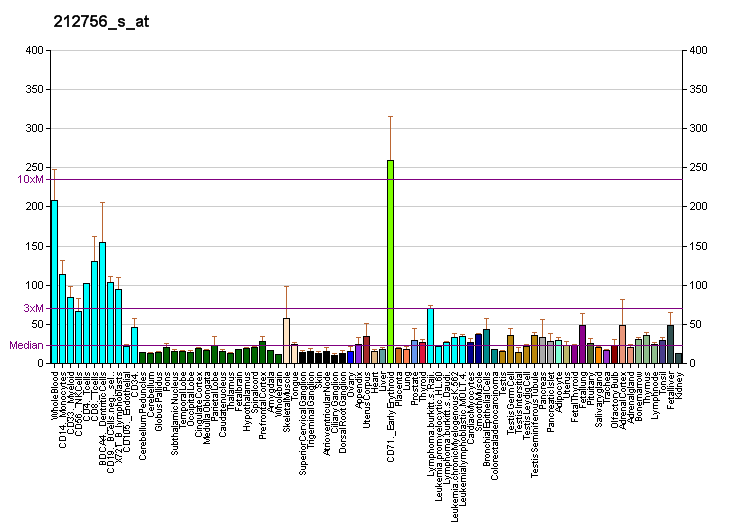

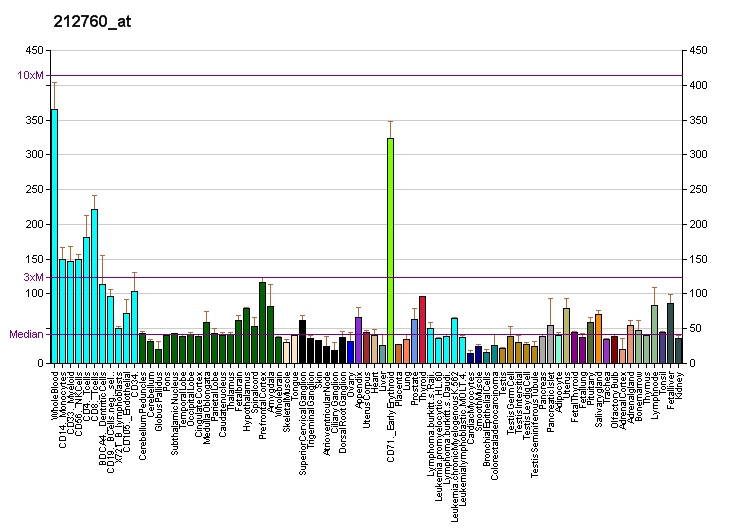
RNA expression pattern
Bgee	Human / Mouse (ortholog); Top expressed in: secondary oocyte; endothelial cell; biceps brachii; Skeletal muscle tissue of biceps brachii; vastus lateralis muscle; skin of hip; hair follicle; Skeletal muscle tissue of rectus abdominis; Brodmann area 23; deltoid muscle / Top expressed in: Rostral migratory stream; interventricular septum; lacrimal gland; ciliary body; muscle of thigh; submandibular gland; vestibular membrane of cochlear duct; retinal pigment epithelium; neural layer of retina; extraocular muscle; More reference expression data
BioGPS	More reference expression data
Gene ontology
Molecular function	protein binding; zinc ion binding; leucine binding; ubiquitin protein ligase activity; metal ion binding; ubiquitin-protein transferase activity; transferase activity
Cellular component	chromatin; nucleus; ubiquitin ligase complex; cytoplasm; cytosol
Biological process	cellular response to leucine; protein catabolic process; male meiosis I; ubiquitin-dependent protein catabolic process; protein ubiquitination; ubiquitin-dependent protein catabolic process via the N-end rule pathway; negative regulation of TOR signaling; histone H2A ubiquitination; protein polyubiquitination; reciprocal meiotic recombination; male meiotic nuclear division; spermatogenesis; negative regulation of transposition
Sources:Amigo / QuickGO
Orthologs
Databases	NCBI: entry; OMA: entry
Species	Human	Mouse
Entrez	23304	224826
Ensembl	ENSG00000024048	ENSMUSG00000023977
UniProt	Q8IWV8	Q6WKZ8
RefSeq (mRNA)	NM_001184801; NM_015255; NM_001363705	NM_001177374; NM_146078
RefSeq (protein)	NP_001171730; NP_056070; NP_001350634	NP_001170845; NP_666190
Location (UCSC)	Chr 6: 42.56 – 42.69 Mb	Chr 17: 47.24 – 47.32 Mb
PubMed search
- Wikidata
View/Edit Human	View/Edit Mouse

E3 ubiquitin-protein ligase UBR2 is an enzyme that in humans is encoded by the UBR2 gene.

Proteolysis by the ubiquitin-proteasome system controls the concentration of many regulatory proteins. The selectivity of ubiquitylation is determined by ubiquitin E3 ligases, which recognize the substrate's destabilization signal, or degron. The E3 ligase UBR2 participates in the N-end rule pathway, which targets proteins bearing an N-terminal degron, or N-degron (Kwon et al., 2003).[supplied by OMIM]
