= ZDHHC14 =

Protein-coding gene in the species Homo sapiens

Identifiers
- Aliases: ZDHHC14, NEW1CP, zinc finger DHHC-type containing 14, zinc finger DHHC-type palmitoyltransferase 14
- External IDs: MGI: 2653229; GeneCards: ZDHHC14
Enzyme activity
EC #	BRENDA	ExPASy	KEGG	MetaCyc
2.3.1.225	↗	↗	↗	↗

Gene location (Human)
Chr.	Chromosome 6 (human)
Band	6q25.3	Start	157,381,133 bp
Band	6q25.3	End	157,678,157 bp

Gene location (Mouse)
Chr.	Chromosome 17 (mouse)
Band	17|17 A1	Start	5,542,832 bp
Band	17|17 A1	End	5,804,086 bp
RNA expression pattern
Bgee	Human / Mouse (ortholog); Top expressed in: C1 segment; buccal mucosa cell; endothelial cell; middle temporal gyrus; tendon of biceps brachii; decidua; body of uterus; inferior ganglion of vagus nerve; inferior olivary nucleus; prefrontal cortex / Top expressed in: motor neuron; dorsal striatum; substantia nigra; Paneth cell; lobe of cerebellum; cerebellar vermis; olfactory tubercle; medial dorsal nucleus; epithelium of lens; transitional epithelium of urinary bladder; More reference expression data
BioGPS	n/a
Gene ontology
Molecular function	protein-cysteine S-palmitoyltransferase activity; palmitoyltransferase activity; transferase activity; acyltransferase activity
Cellular component	integral component of membrane; endoplasmic reticulum; membrane; Golgi apparatus
Biological process	protein palmitoylation; protein targeting to membrane; peptidyl-L-cysteine S-palmitoylation
Sources:Amigo / QuickGO
Orthologs
Databases	NCBI: entry; OMA: entry
Species	Human	Mouse
Entrez	79683	224454
Ensembl	ENSG00000175048	ENSMUSG00000034265
UniProt	Q8IZN3	Q8BQQ1
RefSeq (mRNA)	NM_024630; NM_153746	NM_146073
RefSeq (protein)	NP_078906; NP_714968	NP_666185
Location (UCSC)	Chr 6: 157.38 – 157.68 Mb	Chr 17: 5.54 – 5.8 Mb
PubMed search
- Wikidata
View/Edit Human	View/Edit Mouse

Zinc finger, DHHC-type containing 14 is a protein that in humans is encoded by the ZDHHC14 gene.
