= MTO1 =

Protein-coding gene in the species Homo sapiens

Identifiers
- Aliases: MTO1, COXPD10, CGI-02, mitochondrial tRNA translation optimization 1
- External IDs: OMIM: 614667; MGI: 1915541; HomoloGene: 5876; GeneCards: MTO1; OMA:MTO1 - orthologs

Gene location (Human)
Chr.	Chromosome 6 (human)
Band	6q13	Start	73,461,578 bp
Band	6q13	End	73,509,236 bp

Gene location (Mouse)
Chr.	Chromosome 9 (mouse)
Band	9|9 E1	Start	78,355,490 bp
Band	9|9 E1	End	78,382,630 bp
RNA expression pattern
Bgee	Human / Mouse (ortholog); Top expressed in: germinal epithelium; sperm; endothelial cell; granulocyte; right lobe of liver; epithelium of nasopharynx; Achilles tendon; gonad; kidney tubule; right ventricle / Top expressed in: proximal tubule; spermatocyte; medullary collecting duct; right kidney; quadriceps femoris muscle; fetal liver hematopoietic progenitor cell; triceps surae; gastrocnemius muscle; tibialis anterior muscle; vastus lateralis muscle; More reference expression data
BioGPS	n/a
Gene ontology
Molecular function	flavin adenine dinucleotide binding; RNA binding
Cellular component	mitochondrion
Biological process	tRNA methylation; mitochondrial tRNA wobble uridine modification; tRNA processing; tRNA wobble uridine modification
Sources:Amigo / QuickGO
Orthologs
Species	Human	Mouse
Entrez	25821	68291
Ensembl	ENSG00000135297	ENSMUSG00000032342
UniProt	Q9Y2Z2	Q923Z3
RefSeq (mRNA)	NM_001123226; NM_012123; NM_133645	NM_026658
RefSeq (protein)	NP_001116698; NP_036255; NP_598400	NP_080934
Location (UCSC)	Chr 6: 73.46 – 73.51 Mb	Chr 9: 78.36 – 78.38 Mb
PubMed search
- Wikidata
View/Edit Human	View/Edit Mouse

Protein MTO1 homolog, mitochondrial is a protein that in humans is encoded by the MTO1 gene.
