= USP8P1 =

Pseudogene in the species Homo sapiens

Identifiers
- Aliases: USP8P1, D84394.7, USP8P, ubiquitin specific peptidase 8 pseudogene 1, USP8 pseudogene 1
- External IDs: GeneCards: USP8P1; OMA:USP8P1 - orthologs

Gene location (Human)
Chr.	Chromosome 6 (human)
Band	6p21.33	Start	31,275,572 bp
Band	6p21.33	End	31,278,754 bp
RNA expression pattern
Bgee	Human / Mouse (ortholog); Top expressed in: testicle / n/a; More reference expression data
BioGPS	n/a
Orthologs
Species	Human	Mouse
Entrez	100287272	n/a
Ensembl	ENSG00000214892	n/a
UniProt	n a	n/a
RefSeq (mRNA)	n/a	n/a
RefSeq (protein)	n/a	n/a
Location (UCSC)	Chr 6: 31.28 – 31.28 Mb	n/a
PubMed search		n/a
- Wikidata
View/Edit Human

Ubiquitin specific peptidase 8 pseudogene 1 is a protein that in humans is encoded by the USP8P1 gene.
