= POLR1H =

Protein-coding gene in humans

Identifiers
- Aliases: POLR1H, HTEX-6, Rpa12, TEX6, ZR14, hZR14, tctex-6, HTEX6, TCTEX6, zinc ribbon domain containing 1, RNA polymerase I subunit H, ZNRD1, A12.2
- External IDs: OMIM: 607525; MGI: 1913386; GeneCards: POLR1H

Gene location (Human)
Chr.	Chromosome 6 (human)
Band	6p22.1	Start	30,058,899 bp
Band	6p22.1	End	30,064,909 bp

Gene location (Mouse)
Chr.	Chromosome 17 (mouse)
Band	17|17 B1	Start	37,265,248 bp
Band	17|17 B1	End	37,269,451 bp
RNA expression pattern
Bgee	Human / Mouse (ortholog); Top expressed in: granulocyte; mucosa of transverse colon; gonad; lymph node; blood; appendix; monocyte; rectum; spleen; body of pancreas / Top expressed in: primitive streak; maxillary prominence; blastocyst; mandibular prominence; morula; epiblast; ventricular zone; thymus; otic placode; endocardial cushion; More reference expression data
BioGPS	n/a
Gene ontology
Molecular function	DNA-directed 5'-3' RNA polymerase activity; zinc ion binding; metal ion binding; nucleic acid binding; RNA polymerase I activity
Cellular component	nucleolus; nucleus; nucleoplasm; RNA polymerase I complex
Biological process	transcription initiation from RNA polymerase I promoter; epigenetic maintenance of chromatin in transcription-competent conformation; nucleobase-containing compound metabolic process; transcription, DNA-templated; mRNA cleavage; termination of RNA polymerase I transcription; transcription elongation from RNA polymerase I promoter
Sources:Amigo / QuickGO
Orthologs
Databases	NCBI: entry; OMA: entry
Species	Human	Mouse
Entrez	30834	66136
Ensembl	ENSG00000206502; ENSG00000224859; ENSG00000235443; ENSG00000236949; ENSG00000235176 ENSG00000233795; ENSG00000236808; ENSG00000066379	ENSMUSG00000036315
UniProt	Q9P1U0; Q2L6J2	Q791N7
RefSeq (mRNA)	NM_001278785; NM_001278786; NM_014596; NM_170783	NM_023162; NM_001355422
RefSeq (protein)	NP_001265714; NP_001265715; NP_055411; NP_740753; NP_001265714.1 NP_001265715.1; NP_055411.1; NP_740753.1	NP_075651; NP_001342351
Location (UCSC)	Chr 6: 30.06 – 30.06 Mb	Chr 17: 37.27 – 37.27 Mb
PubMed search
- Wikidata
View/Edit Human	View/Edit Mouse

DNA-directed RNA polymerase I subunit RPA12 is an enzyme that in humans is encoded by the POLR1H gene (previously ZNRD1). This protein is a subunit of the RNA polymerase I complex.

== Function ==
This gene encodes a protein with similarity to the Saccharomyces cerevisiae Rpa12p subunit of RNA polymerase I. Alternate splicing of this gene results in two transcript variants encoding the same protein. Additional splice variants have been described, but their full-length sequences have not been determined.
