= LGSN =

Protein-coding gene in the species Homo sapiens

Available structures
PDB	Ortholog search: PDBe RCSB
PDB	List of PDB id codes 2J9I

Identifiers
- Aliases: LGSN, GLULD1, LGS, lengsin, lens protein with glutamine synthetase domain
- External IDs: OMIM: 611470; MGI: 2672844; HomoloGene: 9569; GeneCards: LGSN; OMA:LGSN - orthologs

Gene location (Human)
Chr.	Chromosome 6 (human)
Band	6q12	Start	63,275,951 bp
Band	6q12	End	63,319,983 bp

Gene location (Mouse)
Chr.	Chromosome 1 (mouse)
Band	1|1 B	Start	31,215,482 bp
Band	1|1 B	End	31,243,806 bp
RNA expression pattern
Bgee	Human / Mouse (ortholog); Top expressed in: buccal mucosa cell; testicle; gonad; right lobe of liver; placenta; epithelium of bronchus; bronchial epithelial cell; human kidney; kidney tubule; islet of Langerhans / Top expressed in: lens; embryo; spermatocyte; spermatid; neural layer of retina; More reference expression data
BioGPS	n/a
Gene ontology
Molecular function	catalytic activity; glutamate-ammonia ligase activity
Cellular component	plasma membrane; membrane
Biological process	glutamine biosynthetic process; nitrogen compound metabolic process; nitrogen utilization
Sources:Amigo / QuickGO
Orthologs
Species	Human	Mouse
Entrez	51557	266744
Ensembl	ENSG00000146166	ENSMUSG00000050217
UniProt	Q5TDP6	Q8CIX8
RefSeq (mRNA)	NM_001143940; NM_016571	NM_153601
RefSeq (protein)	NP_001137412; NP_057655	NP_705829
Location (UCSC)	Chr 6: 63.28 – 63.32 Mb	Chr 1: 31.22 – 31.24 Mb
PubMed search
- Wikidata
View/Edit Human	View/Edit Mouse

Lengsin is a protein that in humans is encoded by the LGSN gene.

Lengsin is a survivor of an ancient family of class I glutamine synthetases in eukaryotes that has undergone evolutionary re-engineering for a tissue-specific, noncatalytic role in the lens of the vertebrate eye. Lengsin is the result of the recruitment of an ancient enzyme may act as a component of the cytoskeleton or as a chaperone for the reorganization of intermediate filament proteins during terminal differentiation in the lens. It does not seem to have enzymatic activity.
