= TMEM200A =

Protein-coding gene in the species Homo sapiens

Identifiers
- Aliases: TMEM200A, KIAA1913, TTMA, TTMC, transmembrane protein 200A
- External IDs: MGI: 1924470; HomoloGene: 14175; GeneCards: TMEM200A; OMA:TMEM200A - orthologs

Gene location (Human)
Chr.	Chromosome 6 (human)
Band	6q23.1	Start	130,366,017 bp
Band	6q23.1	End	130,443,067 bp

Gene location (Mouse)
Chr.	Chromosome 10 (mouse)
Band	10|10 A4	Start	25,788,229 bp
Band	10|10 A4	End	25,954,950 bp
RNA expression pattern
Bgee	Human / Mouse (ortholog); Top expressed in: secondary oocyte; stromal cell of endometrium; islet of Langerhans; germinal epithelium; jejunal mucosa; visceral pleura; pancreatic epithelial cell; palpebral conjunctiva; rectum; mucosa of ileum / Top expressed in: lumbar spinal ganglion; spermatid; otolith organ; utricle; Region I of hippocampus proper; superior cervical ganglion; adrenal gland; visual cortex; primary visual cortex; internal carotid artery; More reference expression data
BioGPS	n/a
Orthologs
Species	Human	Mouse
Entrez	114801	77220
Ensembl	ENSG00000164484	ENSMUSG00000049420
UniProt	Q86VY9	Q8C817
RefSeq (mRNA)	NM_001258276; NM_001258277; NM_001258278; NM_052913	NM_029881; NM_001358814
RefSeq (protein)	NP_001245205; NP_001245206; NP_001245207; NP_443145	NP_084157; NP_001345743
Location (UCSC)	Chr 6: 130.37 – 130.44 Mb	Chr 10: 25.79 – 25.95 Mb
PubMed search
- Wikidata
View/Edit Human	View/Edit Mouse

Transmembrane protein 200A is a protein that in humans is encoded by the TMEM200A gene.
