= ZNF76 =

Protein-coding gene in the species Homo sapiens

Identifiers
- Aliases: ZNF76, D6S229E, ZNF523, Zfp523, zinc finger protein 76
- External IDs: OMIM: 194549; MGI: 2687278; GeneCards: ZNF76

Gene location (Human)
Chr.	Chromosome 6 (human)
Band	6p21.31	Start	35,258,909 bp
Band	6p21.31	End	35,295,985 bp

Gene location (Mouse)
Chr.	Chromosome 17 (mouse)
Band	17|17 A3.3	Start	28,396,103 bp
Band	17|17 A3.3	End	28,424,860 bp
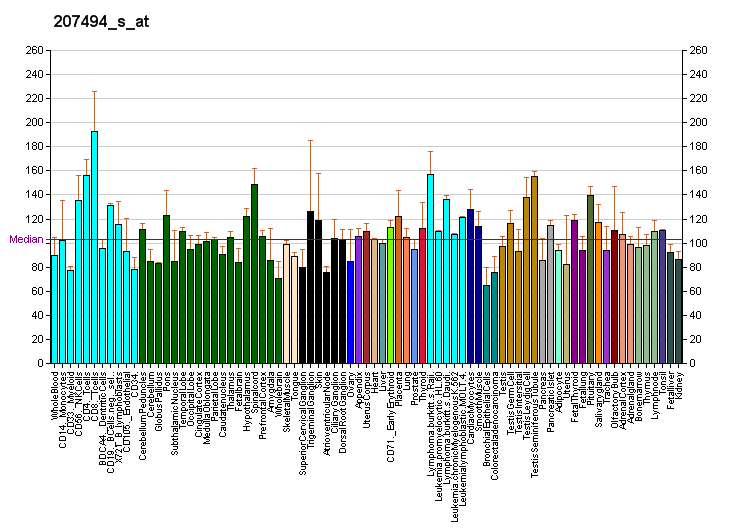
RNA expression pattern
Bgee	Human / Mouse (ortholog); Top expressed in: right lobe of thyroid gland; left lobe of thyroid gland; anterior pituitary; apex of heart; right adrenal cortex; left ovary; right uterine tube; right ovary; left adrenal cortex; right hemisphere of cerebellum / Top expressed in: interventricular septum; superior frontal gyrus; genital tubercle; neural layer of retina; primary visual cortex; tail of embryo; dentate gyrus of hippocampal formation granule cell; ventricular zone; Rostral migratory stream; olfactory epithelium; More reference expression data
BioGPS	More reference expression data
Gene ontology
Molecular function	metal ion binding; DNA binding; nucleic acid binding; DNA-binding transcription activator activity, RNA polymerase II-specific; sequence-specific DNA binding; DNA-binding transcription factor activity, RNA polymerase II-specific
Cellular component	nucleus
Biological process	regulation of transcription, DNA-templated; regulation of transcription by RNA polymerase II; transcription, DNA-templated; regulation of transcription by RNA polymerase III; transcription by RNA polymerase II; positive regulation of transcription by RNA polymerase II
Sources:Amigo / QuickGO
Orthologs
Databases	NCBI: entry; OMA: entry
Species	Human	Mouse
Entrez	7629	224656
Ensembl	ENSG00000065029	ENSMUSG00000024220
UniProt	P36508	Q8BMU0
RefSeq (mRNA)	NM_001292032; NM_003427	NM_172617; NM_001357995
RefSeq (protein)	NP_001278961; NP_003418	NP_766205; NP_001344924
Location (UCSC)	Chr 6: 35.26 – 35.3 Mb	Chr 17: 28.4 – 28.42 Mb
PubMed search
- Wikidata
View/Edit Human	View/Edit Mouse

Zinc finger protein 76 is a protein that in humans is encoded by the ZNF76 gene.
