= RAB44 =

Protein-coding gene in the species Homo sapiens

Identifiers
- Aliases: RAB44, RASD3, RASL13, dJ431A14.3, member RAS oncogene family
- External IDs: MGI: 3045302; GeneCards: RAB44
Enzyme activity
EC #	BRENDA	ExPASy	KEGG	MetaCyc
3.6.5.2	↗	↗	↗	↗

Gene location (Human)
Chr.	Chromosome 6 (human)
Band	6p21.2	Start	36,697,851 bp
Band	6p21.2	End	36,733,183 bp

Gene location (Mouse)
Chr.	Chromosome 17 (mouse)
Band	17|17 A3.3	Start	29,333,119 bp
Band	17|17 A3.3	End	29,367,954 bp
RNA expression pattern
Bgee	Human / Mouse (ortholog); Top expressed in: bone marrow; monocyte; bone marrow cell; granulocyte; blood; gallbladder; upper lobe of left lung; urinary bladder; duodenum; appendix / Top expressed in: granulocyte; blastocyst; morula; bone marrow; embryo; body of femur; lip; esophagus; hair follicle; blood; More reference expression data
BioGPS	n/a
Gene ontology
Molecular function	nucleotide binding; GTP binding; GTPase activity; calcium ion binding
Cellular component	membrane; plasma membrane; azurophil granule membrane; specific granule membrane
Biological process	neutrophil degranulation; intracellular protein transport; Rab protein signal transduction
Sources:Amigo / QuickGO
Orthologs
Databases	NCBI: entry; OMA: entry
Species	Human	Mouse
Entrez	401258	442827
Ensembl	ENSG00000255587	ENSMUSG00000064147
UniProt	Q7Z6P3	Q8CB87
RefSeq (mRNA)	NM_001257357; NM_207498	NM_001002786; NM_001364848
RefSeq (protein)	NP_001244286	NP_001002786; NP_001351777
Location (UCSC)	Chr 6: 36.7 – 36.73 Mb	Chr 17: 29.33 – 29.37 Mb
PubMed search
- Wikidata
View/Edit Human	View/Edit Mouse

RAB44, member RAS oncogene family is a protein that in humans is encoded by the RAB44 gene.
