= ZSCAN9 =

Protein-coding gene in the species Homo sapiens

Identifiers
- Aliases: ZSCAN9, PRD51, ZNF193, zinc finger and SCAN domain containing 9
- External IDs: OMIM: 602246; GeneCards: ZSCAN9

Gene location (Human)
Chr.	Chromosome 6 (human)
Band	6p22.1	Start	28,224,886 bp
Band	6p22.1	End	28,233,487 bp
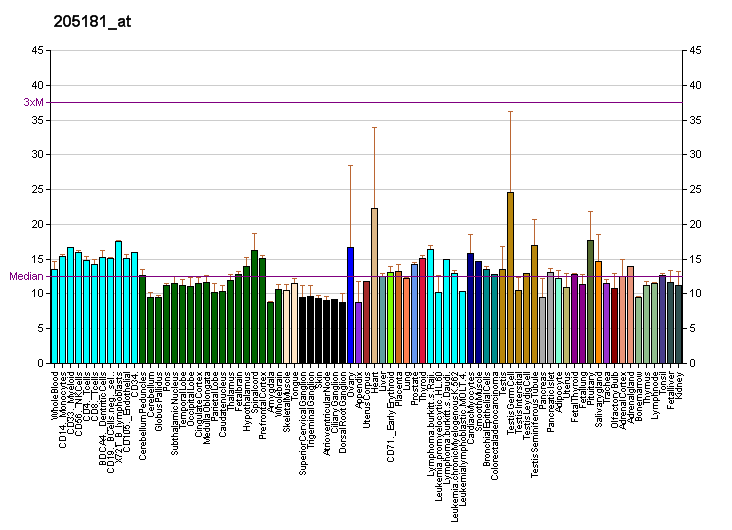
RNA expression pattern
Bgee	Human / Mouse (ortholog); Top expressed in: ganglionic eminence; gonad; oocyte; testicle; right testis; left testis; cerebellar hemisphere; rectum; right hemisphere of cerebellum; mucosa of transverse colon / n/a; More reference expression data
BioGPS	More reference expression data
Gene ontology
Molecular function	DNA binding; protein binding; metal ion binding; nucleic acid binding; DNA-binding transcription factor activity; DNA-binding transcription factor activity, RNA polymerase II-specific
Cellular component	nucleus
Biological process	regulation of transcription, DNA-templated; transcription, DNA-templated; regulation of transcription by RNA polymerase II
Sources:Amigo / QuickGO
Orthologs
Databases	NCBI: entry; OMA: entry
Species	Human	Mouse
Entrez	7746	n/a
Ensembl	ENSG00000137185	n/a
UniProt	O15535	n/a
RefSeq (mRNA)	NM_001199479; NM_001199480; NM_006299	n/a
RefSeq (protein)	NP_001186408; NP_001186409; NP_006290	n/a
Location (UCSC)	Chr 6: 28.22 – 28.23 Mb	n/a
PubMed search		n/a
- Wikidata
View/Edit Human

Zinc finger and SCAN domain-containing protein 9 is a protein that in humans is encoded by the ZSCAN9 gene (previously ZNF193). This protein is predicted to be involved in transcription regulation.
