= Cysteine rich protein 3 =

Protein-coding gene in the species Homo sapiens

CRIP3

Identifiers
- Aliases: CRIP3, TLP, TLP-A, bA480N24.2, cysteine rich protein 3, h6LIMo, CRP-3
- External IDs: MGI: 2152434; GeneCards: CRIP3

Gene location (Human)
Chr.	Chromosome 6 (human)
Band	6p21.1	Start	43,299,710 bp
Band	6p21.1	End	43,308,826 bp

Gene location (Mouse)
Chr.	Chromosome 17 (mouse)
Band	17|17 C	Start	46,739,852 bp
Band	17|17 C	End	46,742,702 bp
RNA expression pattern
Bgee	Human / Mouse (ortholog); Top expressed in: apex of heart; right testis; left testis; cerebellar hemisphere; right hemisphere of cerebellum; testicle; right lobe of liver; granulocyte; left ventricle; nucleus accumbens / Top expressed in: thymus; blastocyst; utricle; esophagus; urethra; lip; male urethra; morula; sternocleidomastoid muscle; embryo; More reference expression data
BioGPS	n/a
Orthologs
Databases	NCBI: entry; OMA: entry
Species	Human	Mouse
Entrez	401262	114570
Ensembl	ENSG00000146215	ENSMUSG00000023968
UniProt	Q6Q6R5	Q6Q6R3
RefSeq (mRNA)	NM_206922; NM_001366068	NM_053250; NM_181664
RefSeq (protein)	NP_996805; NP_001352997	NP_444480; NP_858050
Location (UCSC)	Chr 6: 43.3 – 43.31 Mb	Chr 17: 46.74 – 46.74 Mb
PubMed search
- Wikidata
View/Edit Human	View/Edit Mouse

Cysteine rich protein 3 is a protein that in humans is encoded by the CRIP3 gene.
