= FOXP4-AS1 =

Non-coding RNA in the species Homo sapiens

Identifiers
- Aliases: FOXP4-AS1, FOXP4 antisense RNA 1
- External IDs: GeneCards: FOXP4-AS1

Gene location (Human)
Chr.	Chromosome 6 (human)
Band	6p21.1	Start	41,452,889 bp
Band	6p21.1	End	41,548,621 bp
RNA expression pattern
Bgee	Human / Mouse (ortholog); Top expressed in: mucosa of transverse colon; body of pancreas; sural nerve; gonad; epithelium of colon; Achilles tendon; body of stomach; ventricular zone; rectum; bone marrow cell / n/a; More reference expression data
BioGPS	n/a
Orthologs
Databases	NCBI: entry; OMA: entry
Species	Human	Mouse
Entrez	101060264	n/a
Ensembl	ENSG00000234753	n/a
UniProt	n a	n/a
RefSeq (mRNA)	n/a	n/a
RefSeq (protein)	n/a	n/a
Location (UCSC)	Chr 6: 41.45 – 41.55 Mb	n/a
PubMed search		n/a
- Wikidata
View/Edit Human

FOXP4-AS1 FOXP4 antisense RNA 1 is a protein encoded by the FOXP4-AS1 gene in humans.
