= AKIRIN2 =

Protein-coding gene in the species Homo sapiens

Identifiers
- Aliases: AKIRIN2, C6orf166, FBI1, dJ486L4.2, akirin 2
- External IDs: OMIM: 615165; MGI: 1889364; GeneCards: AKIRIN2

Gene location (Human)
Chr.	Chromosome 6 (human)
Band	6q15	Start	87,674,860 bp
Band	6q15	End	87,702,233 bp

Gene location (Mouse)
Chr.	Chromosome 4 (mouse)
Band	4|4 A5	Start	34,550,937 bp
Band	4|4 A5	End	34,566,908 bp
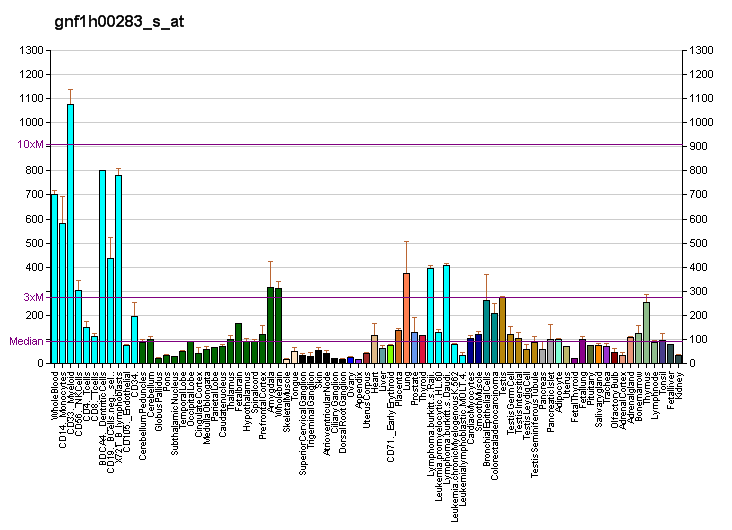
RNA expression pattern
Bgee	Human / Mouse (ortholog); Top expressed in: oocyte; monocyte; secondary oocyte; ganglionic eminence; ventricular zone; myocardium of left ventricle; gastrocnemius muscle; cardiac muscle tissue of right atrium; muscle of thigh; granulocyte / Top expressed in: zygote; oocyte; primary oocyte; secondary oocyte; Ileal epithelium; medial ganglionic eminence; vestibular sensory epithelium; seminiferous tubule; abdominal wall; primitive streak; More reference expression data
BioGPS	More reference expression data
Gene ontology
Molecular function	enzyme binding; protein binding
Cellular component	transcription repressor complex; nucleus; nucleoplasm
Biological process	multicellular organism development; positive regulation of endopeptidase activity; response to lipopolysaccharide; innate immune response; negative regulation of transcription, DNA-templated; regulation of transcription, DNA-templated; negative regulation of transcription by RNA polymerase II; negative regulation of gene expression; transcription, DNA-templated; positive regulation of cell population proliferation; positive regulation of interleukin-6 production; positive regulation of transcription by RNA polymerase II; immune system process; embryo development ending in birth or egg hatching
Sources:Amigo / QuickGO
Orthologs
Databases	NCBI: entry; OMA: entry
Species	Human	Mouse
Entrez	55122	433693
Ensembl	ENSG00000135334	ENSMUSG00000028291
UniProt	Q53H80	B1AXD8
RefSeq (mRNA)	NM_018064	NM_001007589; NM_026019
RefSeq (protein)	NP_060534	NP_001007590
Location (UCSC)	Chr 6: 87.67 – 87.7 Mb	Chr 4: 34.55 – 34.57 Mb
PubMed search
- Wikidata
View/Edit Human	View/Edit Mouse

Akirin-2 is a protein that in humans is encoded by the AKIRIN2 gene.
