= TCP11 =

Protein-coding gene in the species Homo sapiens

Identifiers
- Aliases: TCP11, D6S230E, FPPR, t-complex 11
- External IDs: OMIM: 186982; MGI: 98544; HomoloGene: 8433; GeneCards: TCP11; OMA:TCP11 - orthologs

Gene location (Human)
Chr.	Chromosome 6 (human)
Band	6p21.31	Start	35,118,071 bp
Band	6p21.31	End	35,148,610 bp

Gene location (Mouse)
Chr.	Chromosome 17 (mouse)
Band	17 A3.3|17 14.62 cM	Start	28,066,745 bp
Band	17 A3.3|17 14.62 cM	End	28,080,639 bp
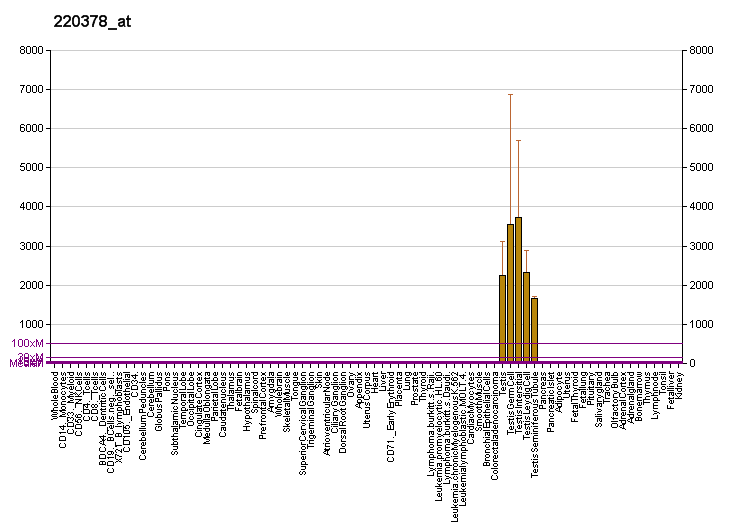
RNA expression pattern
Bgee	Human / Mouse (ortholog); Top expressed in: sperm; left testis; right testis; testicle; gonad; oocyte; secondary oocyte; right uterine tube; olfactory zone of nasal mucosa; amniotic fluid / Top expressed in: seminiferous tubule; spermatid; spermatocyte; lens; epithelium of lens; neural layer of retina; motor neuron; molar; embryo; embryo; More reference expression data
BioGPS	More reference expression data
Gene ontology
Molecular function	protein binding
Cellular component	integral component of membrane; membrane; acrosomal vesicle; cytoplasmic vesicle; sperm flagellum; cell projection; sperm midpiece; motile cilium; cilium
Biological process	cell differentiation; spermatogenesis; multicellular organism development; protein kinase A signaling; regulation of cAMP-mediated signaling; regulation of sperm capacitation
Sources:Amigo / QuickGO
Orthologs
Species	Human	Mouse
Entrez	6954	21463
Ensembl	ENSG00000124678	ENSMUSG00000062859
UniProt	Q8WWU5	Q01755
RefSeq (mRNA)	NM_001093728; NM_001261817; NM_001261818; NM_001261819; NM_001261820 NM_001261821; NM_018679	NM_001085555; NM_013687; NM_001357681; NM_001374620; NM_001374621
RefSeq (protein)	NP_001248746; NP_001248747; NP_001248748; NP_001248749; NP_001248750 NP_061149; NP_001353252; NP_001353253; NP_001353254; NP_001353255; NP_001353256; NP_001353257; NP_001353258; NP_001353259; NP_001353260; NP_001353261; NP_001357616	n/a
Location (UCSC)	Chr 6: 35.12 – 35.15 Mb	Chr 17: 28.07 – 28.08 Mb
PubMed search
- Wikidata
View/Edit Human	View/Edit Mouse

T-complex protein 11 homolog is a protein that in humans is encoded by the TCP11 gene.
