= AIG1 =

Protein-coding gene in the species Homo sapiens

Identifiers
- Aliases: AIG1, AIG-1, dJ95L4.1, androgen-induced 1, androgen induced 1
- External IDs: OMIM: 608514; MGI: 1913503; HomoloGene: 32297; GeneCards: AIG1; OMA:AIG1 - orthologs

Gene location (Human)
Chr.	Chromosome 6 (human)
Band	6q24.2	Start	143,060,496 bp
Band	6q24.2	End	143,340,304 bp

Gene location (Mouse)
Chr.	Chromosome 10 (mouse)
Band	10|10 A2	Start	13,647,054 bp
Band	10|10 A2	End	13,868,980 bp
RNA expression pattern
Bgee	Human / Mouse (ortholog); Top expressed in: buccal mucosa cell; right lobe of liver; C1 segment; pars reticulata; pars compacta; islet of Langerhans; jejunal mucosa; prefrontal cortex; lateral nuclear group of thalamus; stromal cell of endometrium / Top expressed in: olfactory epithelium; right kidney; decidua; cerebellar cortex; proximal tubule; zygote; lobe of cerebellum; dentate gyrus of hippocampal formation granule cell; seminal vesicula; primary oocyte; More reference expression data
BioGPS	n/a
Gene ontology
Molecular function	protein binding; hydrolase activity
Cellular component	integral component of membrane; endomembrane system; membrane
Biological process	long-chain fatty acid catabolic process
Sources:Amigo / QuickGO
Orthologs
Species	Human	Mouse
Entrez	51390	66253
Ensembl	ENSG00000146416	ENSMUSG00000019806
UniProt	Q9NVV5; Q5T2H0	Q9D8B1
RefSeq (mRNA)	NM_001286587; NM_001286588; NM_001286589; NM_016108; NM_001363721	NM_025446; NM_001347362
RefSeq (protein)	NP_001273516; NP_001273517; NP_001273518; NP_057192; NP_001350650 NP_001353273; NP_001353274; NP_001353275; NP_001353276; NP_001353277; NP_001353278; NP_001353279; NP_001353280; NP_001353281; NP_001353282; NP_001353283; NP_001353284; NP_001353285; NP_001353286; NP_001353287; NP_001353288; NP_001353290; NP_001353291; NP_001353292	NP_001334291; NP_079722
Location (UCSC)	Chr 6: 143.06 – 143.34 Mb	Chr 10: 13.65 – 13.87 Mb
PubMed search
- Wikidata
View/Edit Human	View/Edit Mouse

Androgen-induced protein 1 is a protein that in humans is encoded by the AIG1 gene.
