= PRICKLE4 =

Protein-coding gene in the species Homo sapiens

Identifiers
- Aliases: PRICKLE4, C6orf49, OBTP, OEBT, prickle planar cell polarity protein 4
- External IDs: OMIM: 611389; MGI: 2685785; GeneCards: PRICKLE4

Gene location (Human)
Chr.	Chromosome 6 (human)
Band	6p21.1	Start	41,780,782 bp
Band	6p21.1	End	41,787,452 bp

Gene location (Mouse)
Chr.	Chromosome 17 (mouse)
Band	17|17 C	Start	47,999,442 bp
Band	17|17 C	End	48,005,661 bp
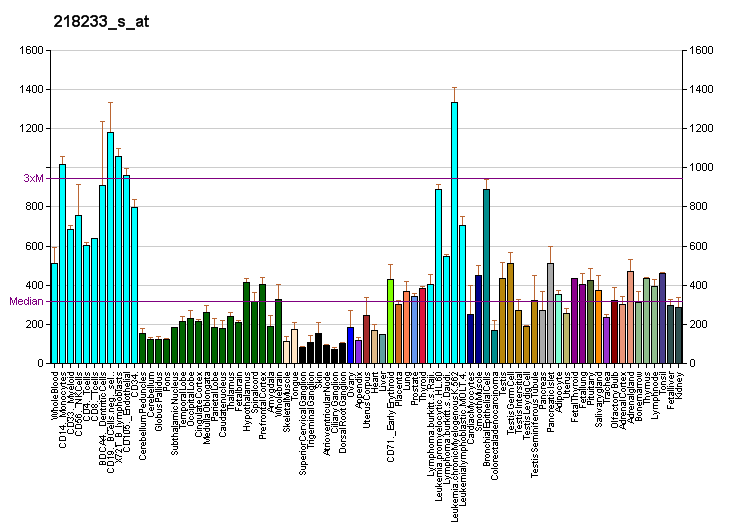
RNA expression pattern
Bgee	Human / Mouse (ortholog); Top expressed in: testicle; gonad; right lobe of thyroid gland; right hemisphere of cerebellum; spleen; left lobe of thyroid gland; apex of heart; right uterine tube; body of uterus; myometrium / Top expressed in: white adipose tissue; muscle tissue; proximal tubule; muscle of thigh; quadriceps femoris muscle; skeletal muscle tissue; embryo; urinary bladder; striatum of neuraxis; spermatocyte; More reference expression data
BioGPS	More reference expression data
Gene ontology
Molecular function	zinc ion binding; metal ion binding; molecular function; actin binding; muscle alpha-actinin binding
Cellular component	nucleus; stress fiber; Z discdkac; filamentous actin
Biological process	biological process; development of the heart; actin cytoskeleton organization; muscle structure development
Sources:Amigo / QuickGO
Orthologs
Databases	NCBI: entry; OMA: entry
Species	Human	Mouse
Entrez	29964	381104
Ensembl	ENSG00000278224	ENSMUSG00000096549
UniProt	Q2TBC4	n/a
RefSeq (mRNA)	NM_013397; NM_017601	NM_001290337
RefSeq (protein)	NP_037529	n/a
Location (UCSC)	Chr 6: 41.78 – 41.79 Mb	Chr 17: 48 – 48.01 Mb
PubMed search
- Wikidata
View/Edit Human	View/Edit Mouse

Prickle-like protein 4 is a protein that in humans is encoded by the PRICKLE4 gene.
