= LST1 =

Protein-coding gene in the species Homo sapiens

Identifiers
- Aliases: LST1, B144, D6S49E, LST-1, leukocyte specific transcript 1
- External IDs: OMIM: 109170; MGI: 1096324; HomoloGene: 136814; GeneCards: LST1; OMA:LST1 - orthologs

Gene location (Human)
Chr.	Chromosome 6 (human)
Band	6p21.33	Start	31,586,124 bp
Band	6p21.33	End	31,588,909 bp

Gene location (Mouse)
Chr.	Chromosome 17 (mouse)
Band	17 B1|17 18.59 cM	Start	35,404,071 bp
Band	17 B1|17 18.59 cM	End	35,407,415 bp
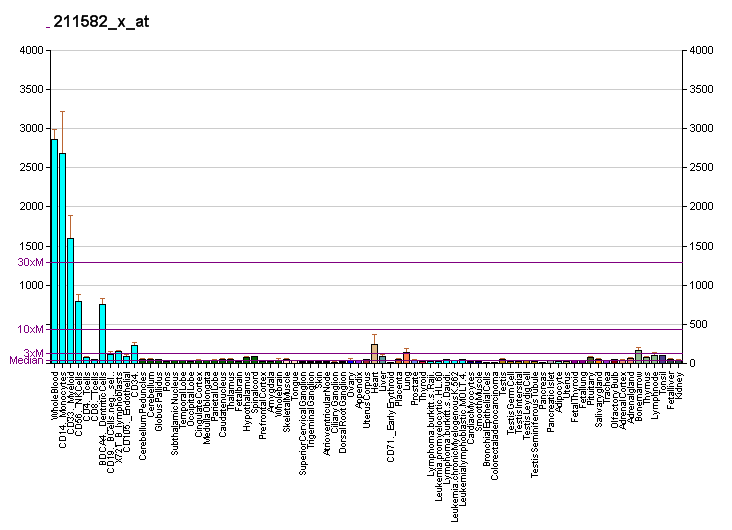

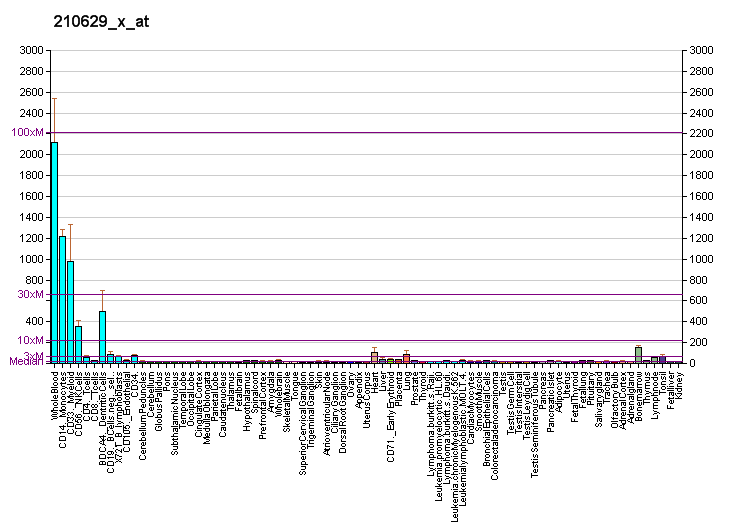

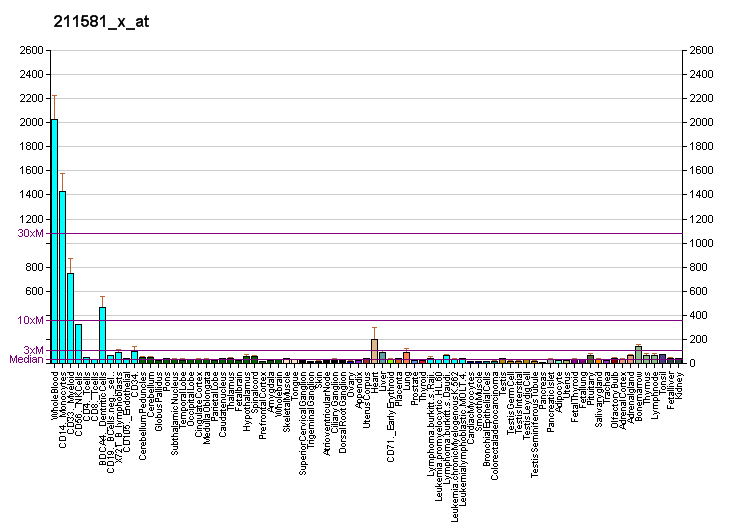
RNA expression pattern
Bgee	Human / Mouse (ortholog); Top expressed in: granulocyte; monocyte; blood; bone marrow; bone marrow cells; spleen; periodontal fiber; trabecular bone; appendix; right lung / Top expressed in: granulocyte; spleen; blood; tibiofemoral joint; mesenteric lymph nodes; internal carotid artery; bone marrow; morula; thymus; external carotid artery; More reference expression data
BioGPS	More reference expression data
Orthologs
Species	Human	Mouse
Entrez	7940	16988
Ensembl	ENSG00000230791; ENSG00000226182; ENSG00000231048; ENSG00000204482; ENSG00000206433 ENSG00000223465; ENSG00000234514; ENSG00000235915	ENSMUSG00000073412
UniProt	O00453	O08843
RefSeq (mRNA)	NM_001166538; NM_007161; NM_205837; NM_205838; NM_205839 NM_205840	NM_010734
RefSeq (protein)	NP_001160010; NP_009092; NP_995309; NP_995310; NP_995311 NP_995312	NP_034864
Location (UCSC)	Chr 6: 31.59 – 31.59 Mb	Chr 17: 35.4 – 35.41 Mb
PubMed search
- Wikidata
View/Edit Human	View/Edit Mouse

Leukocyte-specific transcript 1 protein is a protein that in humans is encoded by the LST1 gene.
