= GTP binding protein 2 =

Protein-coding gene in the species Homo sapiens

GTPBP2

Identifiers
- Aliases: GTPBP2, GTP binding protein 2
- External IDs: OMIM: 607434; MGI: 1860138; GeneCards: GTPBP2

Gene location (Human)
Chr.	Chromosome 6 (human)
Band	6p21.1	Start	43,605,316 bp
Band	6p21.1	End	43,629,162 bp

Gene location (Mouse)
Chr.	Chromosome 17 (mouse)
Band	17|17 C	Start	46,471,958 bp
Band	17|17 C	End	46,480,296 bp
RNA expression pattern
Bgee	Human / Mouse (ortholog); Top expressed in: right lobe of thyroid gland; left lobe of thyroid gland; mucosa of transverse colon; minor salivary glands; anterior pituitary; upper lobe of left lung; granulocyte; right lung; gastric mucosa; monocyte / Top expressed in: neural layer of retina; granulocyte; motor neuron; lip; Rostral migratory stream; Paneth cell; pyloric antrum; ciliary body; fossa; superior frontal gyrus; More reference expression data
BioGPS	n/a
Gene ontology
Molecular function	nucleotide binding; GTP binding; protein binding; GTPase activity; translation elongation factor activity
Cellular component	intracellular membrane-bounded organelle; extracellular region; platelet alpha granule lumen
Biological process	platelet degranulation; biological process; translational elongation
Sources:Amigo / QuickGO
Orthologs
Databases	NCBI: entry; OMA: entry
Species	Human	Mouse
Entrez	54676	56055
Ensembl	ENSG00000172432	ENSMUSG00000023952
UniProt	Q9BX10	Q3UJK4
RefSeq (mRNA)	NM_019096; NM_001286216	NM_001145979; NM_019581; NM_001357745
RefSeq (protein)	NP_001273145; NP_061969; NP_061969.3	NP_001139451; NP_062527; NP_001344674
Location (UCSC)	Chr 6: 43.61 – 43.63 Mb	Chr 17: 46.47 – 46.48 Mb
PubMed search
- Wikidata
View/Edit Human	View/Edit Mouse

GTP binding protein 2 is a protein that in humans is encoded by the GTPBP2 gene.

== Function ==
GTP-binding proteins, or G proteins, constitute a superfamily capable of binding GTP or GDP. G proteins are activated by binding GTP and are inactivated by hydrolyzing GTP to GDP. This general mechanism enables G proteins to perform a wide range of biologic activities.
