= Neuroblastoma highly expressed 1 =

NHEG1

Identifiers
- Aliases: neuroblastoma highly expressed 1
- External IDs: GeneCards:

Gene location (Human)
Chr.	Chromosome 6 (human)
Band	6q23.3	Start	136,982,165 bp
Band	6q23.3	End	136,993,234 bp
RNA expression pattern
Bgee	Human / Mouse (ortholog); Top expressed in: buccal mucosa cell; white blood cell; skin of thigh; ganglionic eminence; skin of abdomen; gonad; tibial nerve; muscle of leg; islet of Langerhans; olfactory zone of nasal mucosa / n/a; More reference expression data
BioGPS	n/a
Orthologs
Databases	NCBI: entry; OMA: entry
Species	Human	Mouse
Entrez	100294720	n/a
Ensembl	ENSG00000225391	n/a
UniProt	n a	n/a
RefSeq (mRNA)	n/a	n/a
RefSeq (protein)	n/a	n/a
Location (UCSC)	Chr 6: 136.98 – 136.99 Mb	n/a
PubMed search		n/a
- Wikidata
View/Edit Human

Neuroblastoma highly expressed 1 is a protein that in humans is encoded by the NHEG1 gene.
