= TRAM2 =

Protein-coding gene in the species Homo sapiens

Identifiers
- Aliases: TRAM2, translocation associated membrane protein 2
- External IDs: OMIM: 608485; MGI: 1924817; GeneCards: TRAM2

Gene location (Human)
Chr.	Chromosome 6 (human)
Band	6p12.2	Start	52,497,408 bp
Band	6p12.2	End	52,577,060 bp

Gene location (Mouse)
Chr.	Chromosome 1 (mouse)
Band	1|1 A4	Start	21,066,523 bp
Band	1|1 A4	End	21,149,453 bp
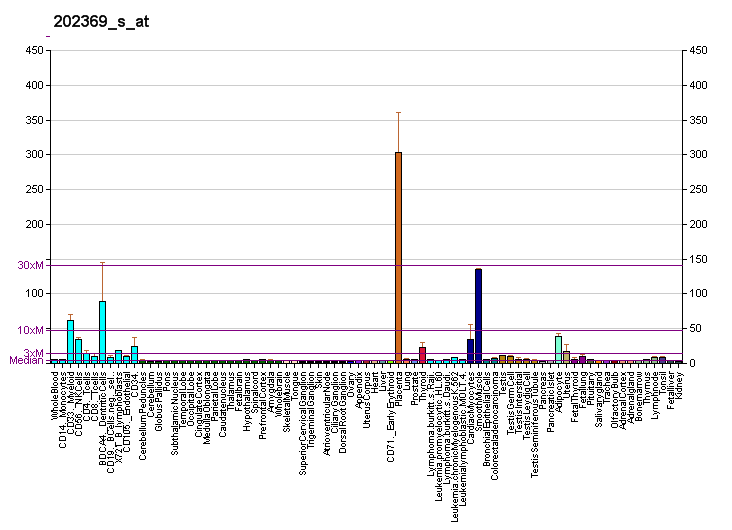

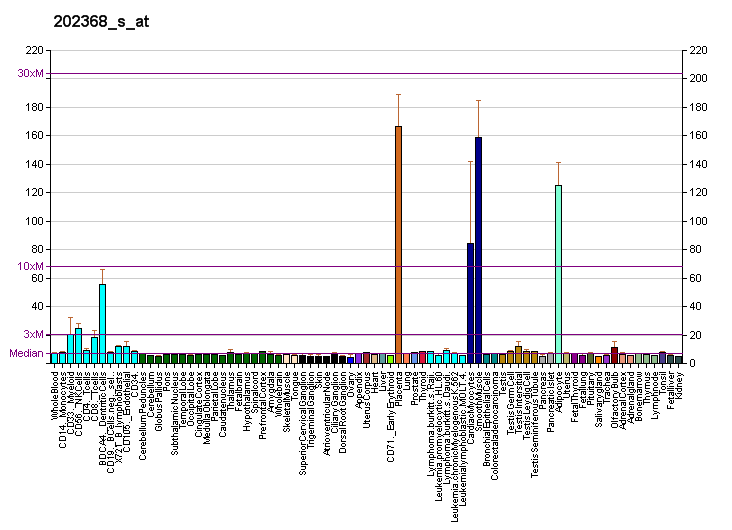
RNA expression pattern
Bgee	Human / Mouse (ortholog); Top expressed in: oocyte; secondary oocyte; stromal cell of endometrium; placenta; cartilage tissue; tibia; synovial membrane; synovial joint; mucosa of ileum; visceral pleura / Top expressed in: ascending aorta; aortic valve; cumulus cell; calvaria; body of femur; mesenteric lymph nodes; umbilical cord; endothelial cell of lymphatic vessel; tail of embryo; ankle; More reference expression data
BioGPS	More reference expression data
Gene ontology
Molecular function	protein binding
Cellular component	membrane; integral component of membrane; rough endoplasmic reticulum
Biological process	protein transport; collagen biosynthetic process; protein insertion into ER membrane; SRP-dependent cotranslational protein targeting to membrane, translocation
Sources:Amigo / QuickGO
Orthologs
Databases	NCBI: entry; OMA: entry
Species	Human	Mouse
Entrez	9697	170829
Ensembl	ENSG00000065308	ENSMUSG00000041779
UniProt	Q15035	Q924Z5
RefSeq (mRNA)	NM_012288	NM_177409
RefSeq (protein)	NP_036420	NP_803128
Location (UCSC)	Chr 6: 52.5 – 52.58 Mb	Chr 1: 21.07 – 21.15 Mb
PubMed search
- Wikidata
View/Edit Human	View/Edit Mouse

Translocating chain-associated membrane protein 2 is a protein that in humans is encoded by the TRAM2 gene.

TRAM2 is a component of the translocon, a gated macromolecular channel that controls the posttranslational processing of nascent secretory and membrane proteins at the endoplasmic reticulum (ER) membrane.
