= HEBP2 =

Protein-coding gene in the species Homo sapiens

Available structures
PDB	Ortholog search: PDBe RCSB
PDB	List of PDB id codes 3R85, 3R8J, 3R8K, 4AYZ, 4B0Y

Identifiers
- Aliases: HEBP2, C6ORF34B, C6orf34, PP23, SOUL, heme binding protein 2
- External IDs: OMIM: 605825; MGI: 1860084; HomoloGene: 8634; GeneCards: HEBP2; OMA:HEBP2 - orthologs

Gene location (Human)
Chr.	Chromosome 6 (human)
Band	6q24.1	Start	138,403,531 bp
Band	6q24.1	End	138,422,197 bp

Gene location (Mouse)
Chr.	Chromosome 10 (mouse)
Band	10|10 A3	Start	18,415,246 bp
Band	10|10 A3	End	18,421,824 bp
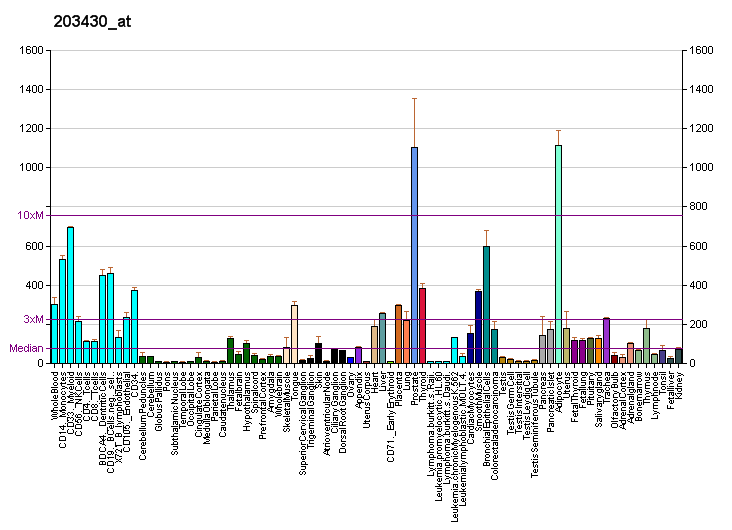
RNA expression pattern
Bgee	Human / Mouse (ortholog); Top expressed in: parotid gland; amniotic fluid; gums; gingival epithelium; vulva; Skeletal muscle tissue of biceps brachii; skin of thigh; right ventricle; adipose tissue; oral cavity / Top expressed in: facial motor nucleus; esophagus; transitional epithelium of urinary bladder; skin of external ear; skin of abdomen; lip; epithelium of lens; motor neuron; conjunctival fornix; cornea; More reference expression data
BioGPS	More reference expression data
Gene ontology
Molecular function	protein binding; heme binding
Cellular component	cytoplasm; extracellular exosome; mitochondrion; extracellular region; azurophil granule lumen
Biological process	negative regulation of mitochondrial membrane potential; positive regulation of necrotic cell death; regulation of response to reactive oxygen species; positive regulation of mitochondrial membrane permeability; neutrophil degranulation
Sources:Amigo / QuickGO
Orthologs
Species	Human	Mouse
Entrez	23593	56016
Ensembl	ENSG00000051620	ENSMUSG00000019853
UniProt	Q9Y5Z4	Q9WU63
RefSeq (mRNA)	NM_014320; NM_001326380; NM_001326381	NM_019487
RefSeq (protein)	NP_001313309; NP_001313310; NP_055135	NP_062360
Location (UCSC)	Chr 6: 138.4 – 138.42 Mb	Chr 10: 18.42 – 18.42 Mb
PubMed search
- Wikidata
View/Edit Human	View/Edit Mouse

Heme-binding protein 2 is a protein that in humans is encoded by the HEBP2 gene.
