= NRSN1 =

Protein-coding gene in the species Homo sapiens

Identifiers
- Aliases: NRSN1, VMP, p24, neurensin 1
- External IDs: OMIM: 616630; MGI: 894662; HomoloGene: 7597; GeneCards: NRSN1; OMA:NRSN1 - orthologs

Gene location (Human)
Chr.	Chromosome 6 (human)
Band	6p22.3	Start	24,126,186 bp
Band	6p22.3	End	24,154,900 bp

Gene location (Mouse)
Chr.	Chromosome 13 (mouse)
Band	13|13 A3.1	Start	25,436,023 bp
Band	13|13 A3.1	End	25,454,485 bp
RNA expression pattern
Bgee	Human / Mouse (ortholog); Top expressed in: dorsolateral prefrontal cortex; cingulate gyrus; anterior cingulate cortex; Brodmann area 9; prefrontal cortex; nucleus accumbens; Brodmann area 46; right frontal lobe; hypothalamus; amygdala / Top expressed in: primary visual cortex; cingulate gyrus; superior frontal gyrus; medial vestibular nucleus; mammillary body; Region I of hippocampus proper; primary motor cortex; dentate gyrus of hippocampal formation granule cell; deep cerebellar nuclei; pontine nuclei; More reference expression data
BioGPS	n/a
Gene ontology
Molecular function	protein binding
Cellular component	growth cone; transport vesicle; membrane; integral component of membrane; soma; neuron projection; cytoplasmic vesicle
Biological process	nervous system development
Sources:Amigo / QuickGO
Orthologs
Species	Human	Mouse
Entrez	140767	22360
Ensembl	ENSG00000152954	ENSMUSG00000048978
UniProt	Q8IZ57	P97799
RefSeq (mRNA)	NM_080723	NM_009513
RefSeq (protein)	NP_542454	NP_033539
Location (UCSC)	Chr 6: 24.13 – 24.15 Mb	Chr 13: 25.44 – 25.45 Mb
PubMed search
- Wikidata
View/Edit Human	View/Edit Mouse

Neurensin-1 is a protein that in humans is encoded by the NRSN1 gene.
