= NOL7 =

Protein-coding gene in the species Homo sapiens

Identifiers
- Aliases: NOL7, C6orf90, PQBP3, RARG-1, dJ223E5.2, nucleolar protein 7
- External IDs: OMIM: 611533; MGI: 1917328; GeneCards: NOL7

Gene location (Human)
Chr.	Chromosome 6 (human)
Band	6p23	Start	13,615,335 bp
Band	6p23	End	13,632,739 bp

Gene location (Mouse)
Chr.	Chromosome 13 (mouse)
Band	13|13 A4	Start	43,551,866 bp
Band	13|13 A4	End	43,560,573 bp
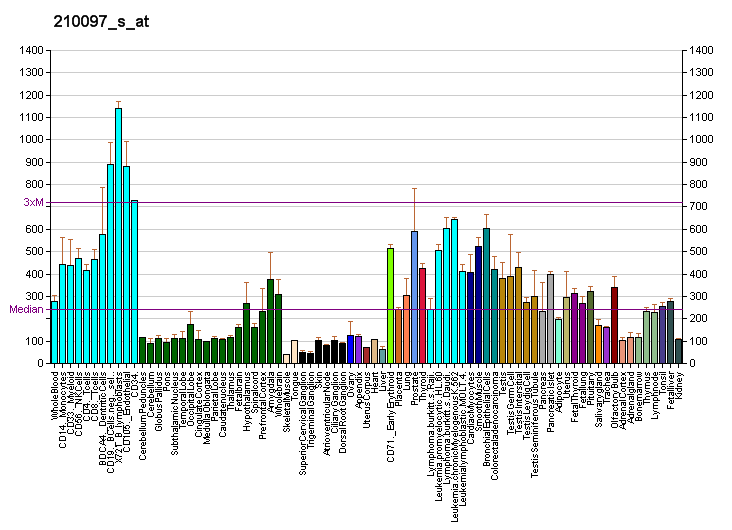

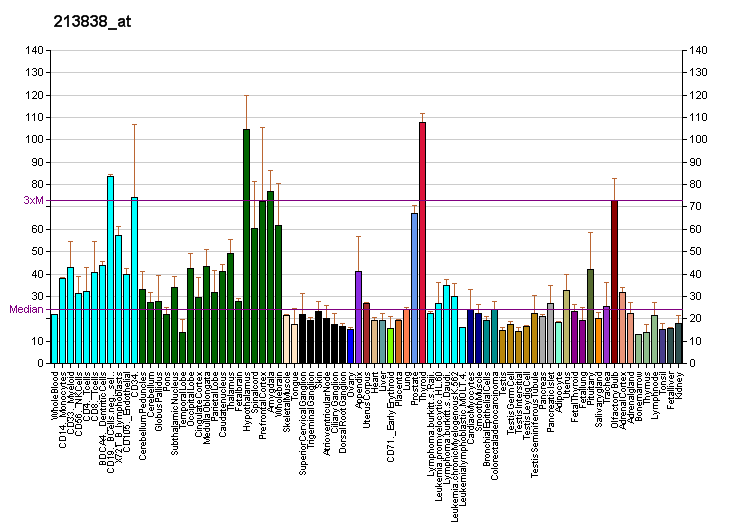

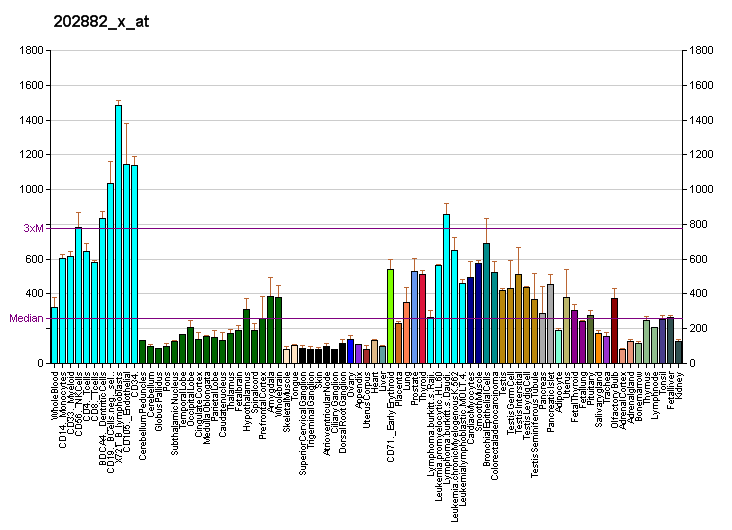
RNA expression pattern
Bgee	Human / Mouse (ortholog); Top expressed in: parotid gland; pancreatic ductal cell; tendon of biceps brachii; epithelium of nasopharynx; right ventricle; bronchial epithelial cell; kidney tubule; Achilles tendon; mucosa of sigmoid colon; myocardium / Top expressed in: medial ganglionic eminence; neural layer of retina; ventricular zone; intercostal muscle; migratory enteric neural crest cell; embryo; mesenteric lymph nodes; muscle of thigh; tail of embryo; vas deferens; More reference expression data
BioGPS	More reference expression data
Orthologs
Databases	NCBI: entry; OMA: entry
Species	Human	Mouse
Entrez	51406	70078
Ensembl	ENSG00000225921	ENSMUSG00000063200
UniProt	Q9UMY1	Q9D7Z3
RefSeq (mRNA)	NM_016167; NM_001317724	NM_023554
RefSeq (protein)	NP_001304653; NP_057251	NP_076043
Location (UCSC)	Chr 6: 13.62 – 13.63 Mb	Chr 13: 43.55 – 43.56 Mb
PubMed search
- Wikidata
View/Edit Human	View/Edit Mouse

Nucleolar protein 7 is a protein that in humans is encoded by the NOL7 gene.
