= TTBK1 =

Protein-coding gene in the species Homo sapiens

Identifiers
- Aliases: TTBK1, BDTK, tau tubulin kinase 1
- External IDs: MGI: 2147036; GeneCards: TTBK1
Available structures
PDB	Ortholog search: PDBe RCSB
PDB	List of PDB id codes 4BTJ, 4BTK, 4BTM, 4NFM, 4NFN
Enzyme activity
EC #	BRENDA	ExPASy	KEGG	MetaCyc
2.7.11.1	↗	↗	↗	↗

Gene location (Human)
Chr.	Chromosome 6 (human)
Band	6p21.1	Start	43,243,481 bp
Band	6p21.1	End	43,288,258 bp

Gene location (Mouse)
Chr.	Chromosome 17 (mouse)
Band	17|17 C	Start	46,753,374 bp
Band	17|17 C	End	46,798,601 bp
RNA expression pattern
Bgee	Human / Mouse (ortholog); Top expressed in: lateral nuclear group of thalamus; prefrontal cortex; postcentral gyrus; right frontal lobe; right hemisphere of cerebellum; superior frontal gyrus; anterior cingulate cortex; entorhinal cortex; Brodmann area 9; amygdala / Top expressed in: superior frontal gyrus; primary visual cortex; seminiferous tubule; dentate gyrus of hippocampal formation granule cell; cerebellar cortex; Rostral migratory stream; primary motor cortex; cingulate gyrus; spermatid; subiculum; More reference expression data
BioGPS	n/a
Gene ontology
Molecular function	transferase activity; nucleotide binding; protein kinase activity; protein serine/threonine kinase activity; ATP binding; kinase activity; tau protein binding; tau-protein kinase activity
Cellular component	cytoplasm; nucleus; nucleoplasm; cytosol; microtubule associated complex; soma; perinuclear region of cytoplasm
Biological process	protein phosphorylation; peptidyl-serine phosphorylation; substantia nigra development; phosphorylation; regulation of cell shape; learning or memory; positive regulation of gene expression; negative regulation of gene expression; peptidyl-threonine phosphorylation; peptidyl-tyrosine phosphorylation; negative regulation of protein binding; positive regulation of protein polymerization; positive regulation of astrocyte activation; positive regulation of microglial cell activation; positive regulation of cyclin-dependent protein kinase activity; positive regulation of cysteine-type endopeptidase activity
Sources:Amigo / QuickGO
Orthologs
Databases	NCBI: entry; OMA: entry
Species	Human	Mouse
Entrez	84630	106763
Ensembl	ENSG00000146216	ENSMUSG00000015599
UniProt	Q5TCY1	Q6PCN3
RefSeq (mRNA)	NM_032538	NM_001162864; NM_175351
RefSeq (protein)	NP_115927	NP_001156336
Location (UCSC)	Chr 6: 43.24 – 43.29 Mb	Chr 17: 46.75 – 46.8 Mb
PubMed search
- Wikidata
View/Edit Human	View/Edit Mouse

Tau tubulin kinase 1 is a protein that in humans is encoded by the TTBK1 gene.
