= IMPG1 =

Protein-coding gene in the species Homo sapiens

Identifiers
- Aliases: IMPG1, GP147, IPM150, SPACR, VMD4, interphotoreceptor matrix proteoglycan 1, RP91
- External IDs: OMIM: 602870; MGI: 1926876; GeneCards: IMPG1

Gene location (Human)
Chr.	Chromosome 6 (human)
Band	6q14.1	Start	75,921,114 bp
Band	6q14.1	End	76,072,678 bp

Gene location (Mouse)
Chr.	Chromosome 9 (mouse)
Band	9 E1|9 43.99 cM	Start	80,220,612 bp
Band	9 E1|9 43.99 cM	End	80,347,534 bp
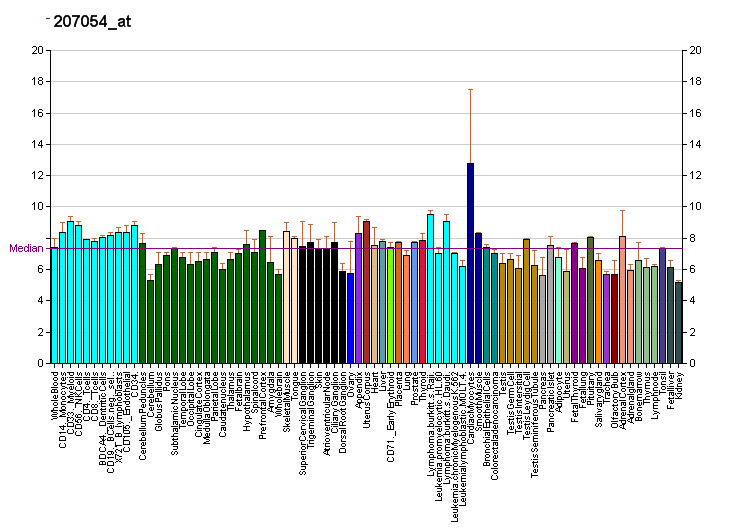
RNA expression pattern
Bgee	Human / Mouse (ortholog); Top expressed in: testicle; nucleus accumbens; secondary oocyte; caudate nucleus; gonad; putamen; right hemisphere of cerebellum; Brodmann area 9; right frontal lobe; right lung / Top expressed in: neural layer of retina; retinal pigment epithelium; gastrula; embryo; epithelium of lens; lumbar spinal ganglion; semi-lunar valve; left ventricle; aortic valve; More reference expression data
BioGPS	More reference expression data
Gene ontology
Molecular function	extracellular matrix structural constituent
Cellular component	extracellular region; extracellular matrix
Biological process	visual perception
Sources:Amigo / QuickGO
Orthologs
Databases	NCBI: entry; OMA: entry
Species	Human	Mouse
Entrez	3617	63859
Ensembl	ENSG00000112706	ENSMUSG00000032343
UniProt	Q17R60	Q8R1W8
RefSeq (mRNA)	NM_001563; NM_001282368	NM_022016
RefSeq (protein)	NP_001269297; NP_001554	NP_071299
Location (UCSC)	Chr 6: 75.92 – 76.07 Mb	Chr 9: 80.22 – 80.35 Mb
PubMed search
- Wikidata
View/Edit Human	View/Edit Mouse

Interphotoreceptor matrix proteoglycan 1 is a protein that in humans is encoded by the IMPG1 gene.
