= PCMT1 =

Protein-coding gene in the species Homo sapiens

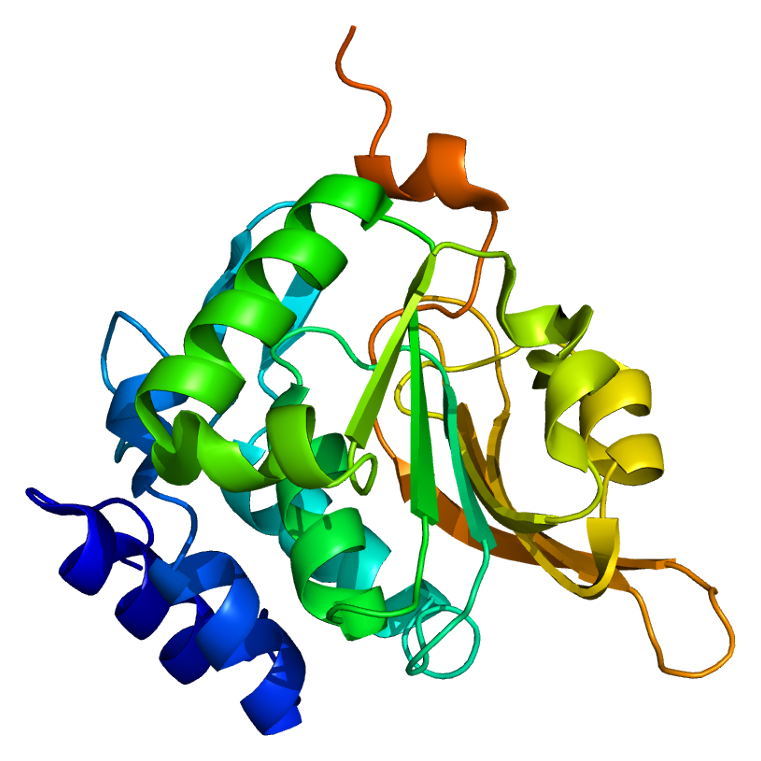

Identifiers
- Aliases: PCMT1, PIMT, protein-L-isoaspartate (D-aspartate) O-methyltransferase
- External IDs: OMIM: 176851; MGI: 97502; GeneCards: PCMT1
Available structures
| PDB | Ortholog search: PDBe RCSB |
| PDB | List of PDB id codes 1I1N, 1KR5 |
Enzyme activity
| EC # | BRENDA | ExPASy | KEGG | MetaCyc |
|---|---|---|---|---|
| 2.1.1.77 | ↗ | ↗ | ↗ | ↗ |

Gene location (Human)
| Chr. | Chromosome 6 (human) |
| Band | 6q25.1 | Start | 149,749,443 bp |
| Band | 6q25.1 | End | 149,811,420 bp |

Gene location (Mouse)
| Chr. | Chromosome 10 (mouse) |
| Band | 10 A1|10 2.26 cM | Start | 7,629,373 bp |
| Band | 10 A1|10 2.26 cM | End | 7,681,136 bp |
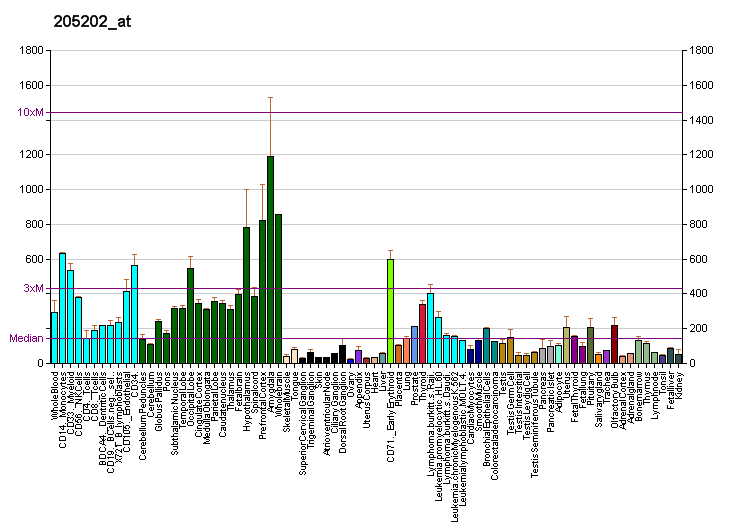

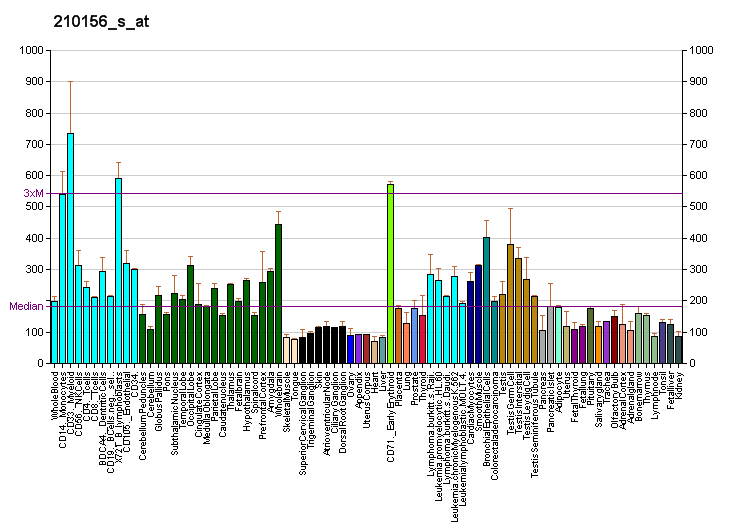

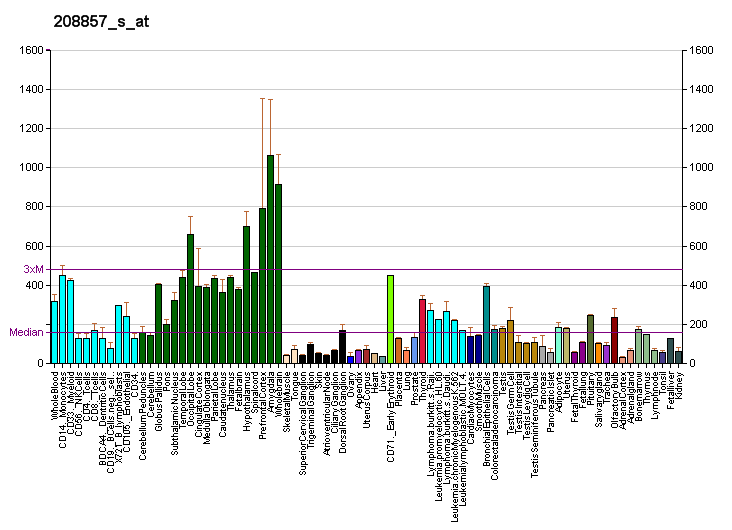
RNA expression pattern
| Bgee | Human / Mouse (ortholog); Top expressed in: endothelial cell; Brodmann area 23; middle temporal gyrus; pons; frontal pole; spinal ganglia; prefrontal cortex; orbitofrontal cortex; trigeminal ganglion; superior vestibular nucleus / Top expressed in: spermatocyte; hypothalamus; testicle; lens; quadriceps femoris muscle; primary visual cortex; superior frontal gyrus; neural tube; hippocampus proper; cerebellar cortex; More reference expression data |
| BioGPS | More reference expression data |
Gene ontology
| Molecular function | methyltransferase activity; transferase activity; protein binding; protein-L-isoaspartate (D-aspartate) O-methyltransferase activity; cadherin binding |
| Cellular component | extracellular vesicle; extracellular exosome; cytoplasm; cytosol |
| Biological process | methylation; protein repair; protein methylation |
Sources:Amigo / QuickGO
Orthologs
| Databases | NCBI: entry; OMA: entry |
| Species | Human | Mouse |
| Entrez | 5110 | 18537 |
| Ensembl | ENSG00000120265 | ENSMUSG00000019795 |
| UniProt | P22061 | P23506 |
| RefSeq (mRNA) | NM_001252049; NM_001252050; NM_001252051; NM_001252052; NM_001252053 NM_005389; NM_001360452; NM_001360456 | NM_008786; NM_001347228; NM_001358647; NM_001358649; NM_001358651 NM_001358652; NM_001358653; NM_001358654; NM_001358657 |
| RefSeq (protein) | NP_001238978; NP_001238979; NP_001238980; NP_001238981; NP_001238982 NP_005380; NP_001347381; NP_001347385 | n/a |
| Location (UCSC) | Chr 6: 149.75 – 149.81 Mb | Chr 10: 7.63 – 7.68 Mb |
| PubMed search |
- Wikidata
| View/Edit Human | View/Edit Mouse |

Protein-L-isoaspartate(D-aspartate) O-methyltransferase is an enzyme that in humans is encoded by the PCMT1 gene.

Three classes of protein carboxyl methyltransferases, distinguished by their methyl-acceptor substrate specificity, have been found in prokaryotic and eukaryotic cells. The type II enzyme catalyzes the transfer of a methyl group from S-adenosyl-L-methionine to the free carboxyl groups of D-aspartyl and L-isoaspartyl residues. These methyl-accepting residues result from the spontaneous deamidation, isomerization, and racemization of normal L-aspartyl and L-asparaginyl residues and represent sites of covalent damage to aging proteins PCMT1 (EC 2.1.1.77) is a protein repair enzyme that initiates the conversion of abnormal D-aspartyl and L-isoaspartyl residues to the normal L-aspartyl form.[supplied by OMIM]
