= SERINC1 =

Protein-coding gene in the species Homo sapiens

Identifiers
- Aliases: SERINC1, TDE1L, TDE2, TMS-2, TMS2, serine incorporator 1
- External IDs: OMIM: 614548; MGI: 1926228; HomoloGene: 41334; GeneCards: SERINC1; OMA:SERINC1 - orthologs

Gene location (Human)
Chr.	Chromosome 6 (human)
Band	6q22.31	Start	122,443,351 bp
Band	6q22.31	End	122,471,807 bp

Gene location (Mouse)
Chr.	Chromosome 10 (mouse)
Band	10|10 B4	Start	57,391,870 bp
Band	10|10 B4	End	57,408,626 bp
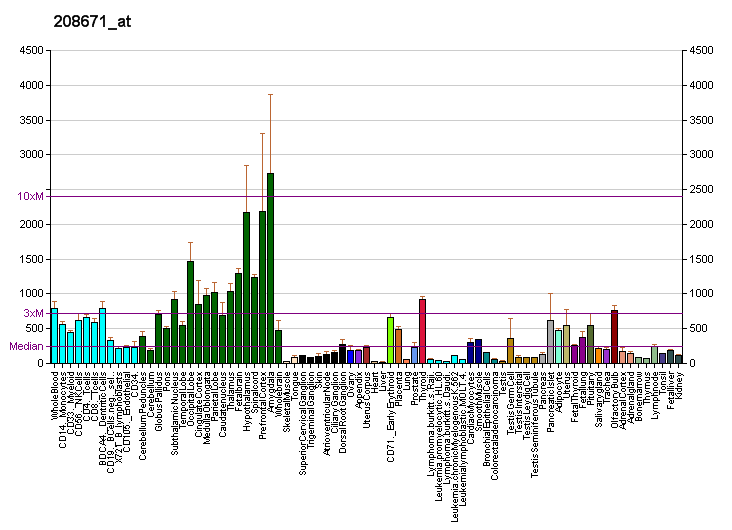
RNA expression pattern
Bgee	Human / Mouse (ortholog); Top expressed in: pons; lateral nuclear group of thalamus; orbitofrontal cortex; postcentral gyrus; pars compacta; subthalamic nucleus; pars reticulata; superior vestibular nucleus; external globus pallidus; C1 segment / Top expressed in: lobe of cerebellum; cerebellar vermis; ventral tegmental area; medial dorsal nucleus; dorsomedial hypothalamic nucleus; dorsal tegmental nucleus; medial geniculate nucleus; subiculum; paraventricular nucleus of hypothalamus; mammillary body; More reference expression data
BioGPS	More reference expression data
Gene ontology
Molecular function	protein binding; enzyme binding; protein-macromolecule adaptor activity; L-serine transmembrane transporter activity
Cellular component	plasma membrane; endoplasmic reticulum membrane; endoplasmic reticulum; membrane; integral component of membrane
Biological process	phosphatidylserine metabolic process; positive regulation of CDP-diacylglycerol-serine O-phosphatidyltransferase activity; positive regulation of serine C-palmitoyltransferase activity; sphingolipid metabolic process; phospholipid biosynthetic process; lipid metabolism; L-serine transport; membrane biogenesis
Sources:Amigo / QuickGO
Orthologs
Species	Human	Mouse
Entrez	57515	56442
Ensembl	ENSG00000111897	ENSMUSG00000019877
UniProt	Q9NRX5	Q9QZI8
RefSeq (mRNA)	NM_020755	NM_019760
RefSeq (protein)	NP_065806	NP_062734
Location (UCSC)	Chr 6: 122.44 – 122.47 Mb	Chr 10: 57.39 – 57.41 Mb
PubMed search
- Wikidata
View/Edit Human	View/Edit Mouse

Serine incorporator 1 is a protein that in humans is encoded by the SERINC1 gene.
