= Armadillo repeat containing 12 =

Protein-coding gene in the species Homo sapiens

ARMC12

Identifiers
- Aliases: ARMC12, C6orf81, armadillo repeat containing 12
- External IDs: MGI: 1914895; GeneCards: ARMC12

Gene location (Human)
Chr.	Chromosome 6 (human)
Band	6p21.31	Start	35,737,032 bp
Band	6p21.31	End	35,749,079 bp

Gene location (Mouse)
Chr.	Chromosome 17 (mouse)
Band	17|17 A3.3	Start	28,749,780 bp
Band	17|17 A3.3	End	28,758,084 bp
RNA expression pattern
Bgee	Human / Mouse (ortholog); Top expressed in: right testis; left testis; testicle; anterior pituitary; sperm; right lobe of liver; left uterine tube; left ovary; right ovary; right adrenal gland / Top expressed in: seminiferous tubule; spermatid; spermatocyte; granulocyte; morula; embryo; muscle of thigh; secondary oocyte; yolk sac; zygote; More reference expression data
BioGPS	n/a
Orthologs
Databases	NCBI: entry; OMA: entry
Species	Human	Mouse
Entrez	221481	67645
Ensembl	ENSG00000157343	ENSMUSG00000024223
UniProt	Q5T9G4	Q80X86
RefSeq (mRNA)	NM_001286574; NM_001286576; NM_145028	NM_026290
RefSeq (protein)	NP_001273503; NP_001273505; NP_659465	NP_080566
Location (UCSC)	Chr 6: 35.74 – 35.75 Mb	Chr 17: 28.75 – 28.76 Mb
PubMed search
- Wikidata
View/Edit Human	View/Edit Mouse

Armadillo repeat containing 12 is a protein that in humans is encoded by the ARMC12 gene that plays a crucial role in tumor progression. It is associated with the development of neuroblastoma (NB) as it encourages the growth and aggressiveness of NB cell lines.
