= UNC5CL =

Protein-coding gene in the species Homo sapiens

Identifiers
- Aliases: UNC5CL, MUXA, ZUD, unc-5 family C-terminal like
- External IDs: OMIM: 617464; MGI: 1923839; GeneCards: UNC5CL

Gene location (Human)
Chr.	Chromosome 6 (human)
Band	6p21.1	Start	41,026,895 bp
Band	6p21.1	End	41,039,221 bp

Gene location (Mouse)
Chr.	Chromosome 17 (mouse)
Band	17|17 C	Start	48,761,929 bp
Band	17|17 C	End	48,846,742 bp
RNA expression pattern
Bgee	Human / Mouse (ortholog); Top expressed in: pancreatic epithelial cell; pancreatic ductal cell; mucosa of ileum; duodenum; right lobe of liver; body of pancreas; jejunal mucosa; human kidney; pylorus; body of stomach / Top expressed in: basilar part of occipital bone; jejunum; duodenum; humerus; splanchnocranium; hyoid bone; sphenoid bone; ileum; Meckel's cartilage; femur; More reference expression data
BioGPS	n/a
Gene ontology
Molecular function	peptidase activity; netrin receptor activity
Cellular component	cytoplasm; integral component of membrane; membrane
Biological process	positive regulation of I-kappaB kinase/NF-kappaB signaling; positive regulation of JNK cascade; signal transduction; proteolysis; netrin-activated signaling pathway
Sources:Amigo / QuickGO
Orthologs
Databases	NCBI: entry; OMA: entry
Species	Human	Mouse
Entrez	222643	76589
Ensembl	ENSG00000124602	ENSMUSG00000043592
UniProt	Q8IV45	Q6R653
RefSeq (mRNA)	NM_173561	NM_152823
RefSeq (protein)	NP_775832	n/a
Location (UCSC)	Chr 6: 41.03 – 41.04 Mb	Chr 17: 48.76 – 48.85 Mb
PubMed search
- Wikidata
View/Edit Human	View/Edit Mouse

Unc-5 homolog C (C. elegans)-like is a protein in humans that is encoded by the UNC5CL gene.
