= ZKSCAN4 =

Protein-coding gene in the species Homo sapiens

Identifiers
- Aliases: ZKSCAN4, P1P373C6, ZNF307, ZNF427, ZSCAN36, p373c6.1, zinc finger with KRAB and SCAN domains 4
- External IDs: OMIM: 611643; MGI: 1919989; GeneCards: ZKSCAN4

Gene location (Human)
Chr.	Chromosome 6 (human)
Band	6p22.1	Start	28,241,697 bp
Band	6p22.1	End	28,252,269 bp

Gene location (Mouse)
Chr.	Chromosome 13 (mouse)
Band	13|13 A3.1	Start	21,571,173 bp
Band	13|13 A3.1	End	21,586,925 bp
RNA expression pattern
Bgee	Human / Mouse (ortholog); Top expressed in: sperm; oocyte; secondary oocyte; epithelium of nasopharynx; testicle; germinal epithelium; gingival epithelium; spleen; granulocyte; stromal cell of endometrium / Top expressed in: Rostral migratory stream; ventricular zone; body of femur; ganglionic eminence; epithelium of small intestine; vestibular sensory epithelium; spermatocyte; ciliary body; hand; neural layer of retina; More reference expression data
BioGPS	n/a
Gene ontology
Molecular function	DNA binding; protein binding; metal ion binding; nucleic acid binding; DNA-binding transcription factor activity; identical protein binding; DNA-binding transcription factor activity, RNA polymerase II-specific
Cellular component	intracellular anatomical structure; nucleus; nucleoplasm; cytosol
Biological process	regulation of transcription, DNA-templated; transcription, DNA-templated; regulation of transcription by RNA polymerase II
Sources:Amigo / QuickGO
Orthologs
Databases	NCBI: entry; OMA: entry
Species	Human	Mouse
Entrez	387032	72739
Ensembl	ENSG00000187626	ENSMUSG00000021327
UniProt	Q969J2	Q91VW9
RefSeq (mRNA)	NM_001304506; NM_019110	NM_001145778; NM_023685; NM_001368182
RefSeq (protein)	NP_001291435; NP_061983	NP_001139250; NP_076174; NP_001355111
Location (UCSC)	Chr 6: 28.24 – 28.25 Mb	Chr 13: 21.57 – 21.59 Mb
PubMed search
- Wikidata
View/Edit Human	View/Edit Mouse

Zinc finger with KRAB and SCAN domains 4 is a protein that in humans is encoded by the ZKSCAN4 gene.
