= MAN1A1 =

Protein-coding gene in the species Homo sapiens

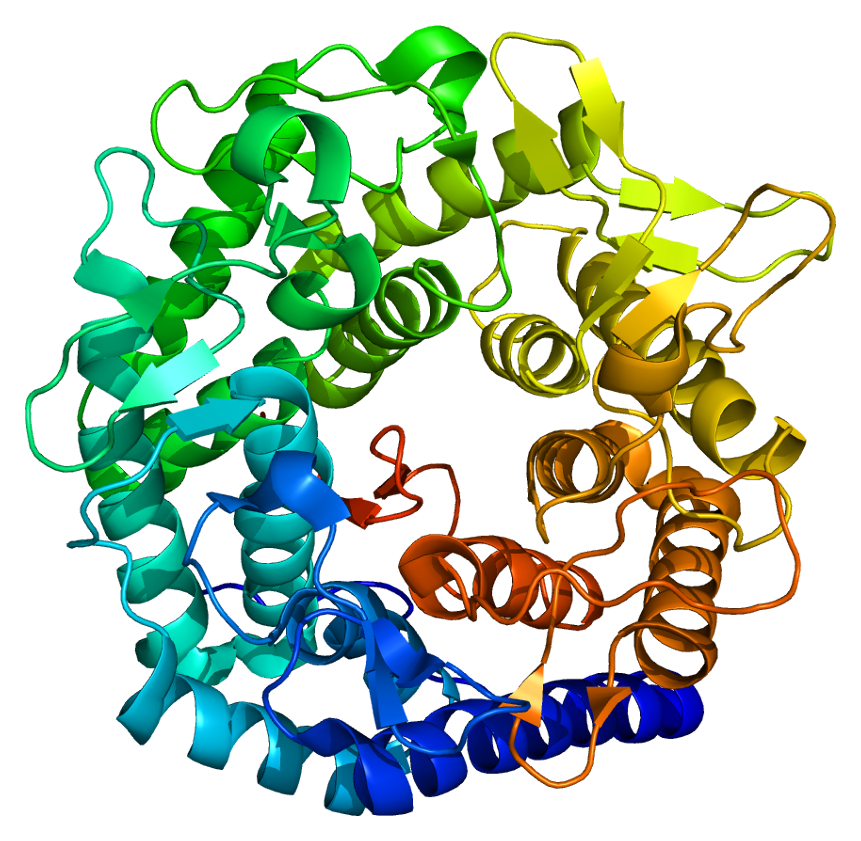

Identifiers
- Aliases: MAN1A1, HUMM3, HUMM9, MAN9, mannosidase alpha class 1A member 1
- External IDs: OMIM: 604344; MGI: 104677; GeneCards: MAN1A1
Available structures
| PDB | Ortholog search: PDBe RCSB |
| PDB | List of PDB id codes 1NXC |
Enzyme activity
| EC # | BRENDA | ExPASy | KEGG | MetaCyc |
|---|---|---|---|---|
| 3.2.1.113 | ↗ | ↗ | ↗ | ↗ |

Gene location (Human)
| Chr. | Chromosome 6 (human) |
| Band | 6q22.31 | Start | 119,177,205 bp |
| Band | 6q22.31 | End | 119,349,761 bp |

Gene location (Mouse)
| Chr. | Chromosome 10 (mouse) |
| Band | 10|10 B3 | Start | 53,780,881 bp |
| Band | 10|10 B3 | End | 53,952,705 bp |
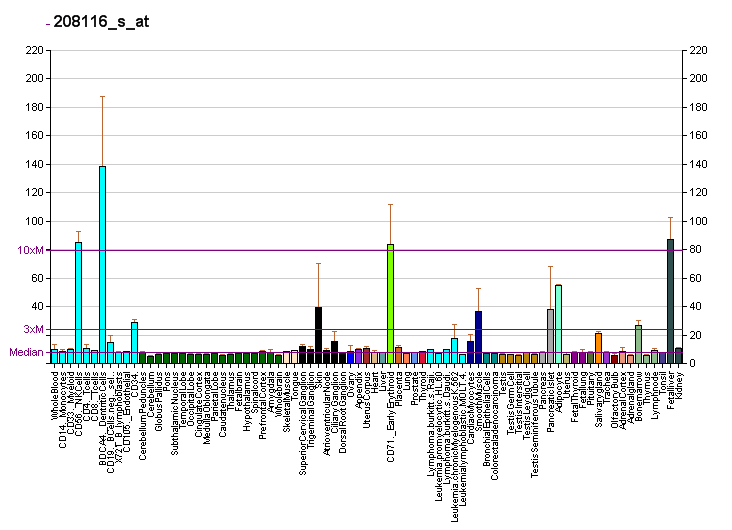

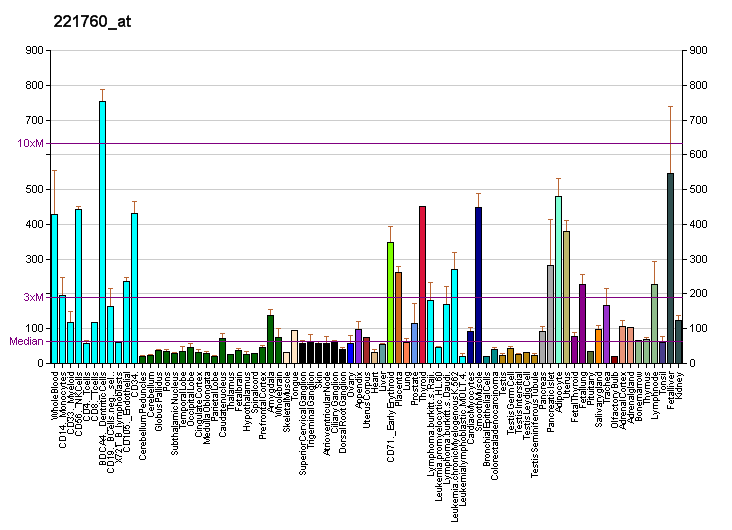
RNA expression pattern
| Bgee | Human / Mouse (ortholog); Top expressed in: synovial joint; renal medulla; pericardium; jejunal mucosa; lower lobe of lung; urethra; parotid gland; palpebral conjunctiva; Achilles tendon; skin of hip / Top expressed in: parotid gland; mesenteric lymph nodes; lateral septal nucleus; vestibular membrane of cochlear duct; retinal pigment epithelium; lacrimal gland; epithelium of stomach; otic placode; submandibular gland; spleen; More reference expression data |
| BioGPS | More reference expression data |
Gene ontology
| Molecular function | calcium ion binding; hydrolase activity; mannosidase activity; hydrolase activity, acting on glycosyl bonds; mannosyl-oligosaccharide 1,2-alpha-mannosidase activity; catalytic activity |
| Cellular component | integral component of membrane; Golgi membrane; Golgi apparatus; extracellular exosome; endoplasmic reticulum; membrane; endoplasmic reticulum-Golgi intermediate compartment; cytosol |
| Biological process | protein glycosylation; N-glycan processing; metabolism; Golgi apparatus mannose trimming |
Sources:Amigo / QuickGO
Orthologs
| Databases | NCBI: entry; OMA: entry |
| Species | Human | Mouse |
| Entrez | 4121 | 17155 |
| Ensembl | ENSG00000111885 | ENSMUSG00000003746 |
| UniProt | P33908 | P45700 |
| RefSeq (mRNA) | NM_005907 | NM_008548 |
| RefSeq (protein) | NP_005898 | NP_032574 |
| Location (UCSC) | Chr 6: 119.18 – 119.35 Mb | Chr 10: 53.78 – 53.95 Mb |
| PubMed search |
- Wikidata
| View/Edit Human | View/Edit Mouse |

Mannosyl-oligosaccharide 1,2-alpha-mannosidase IA is an enzyme that in humans is encoded by the MAN1A1 gene.

This gene encodes a class I mammalian Golgi 1,2-mannosidase which is a type II transmembrane protein. This protein catalyzes the removal of 3 distinct mannose residues from peptide-bound Man(9)-GlcNAc(2) oligosaccharides and belongs to family 47 of glycosyl hydrolases.
