= Gametogenetin binding protein 1 (pseudogene) =

Pseudogene in the species Homo sapiens

GGNBP1

Identifiers
- Aliases: GGNBP1, gametogenetin binding protein 1 (pseudogene)
- External IDs: OMIM: 609495; GeneCards: GGNBP1

Gene location (Human)
Chr.	Chromosome 6 (human)
Band	6p21.31	Start	33,540,046 bp
Band	6p21.31	End	33,589,026 bp
Orthologs
Databases	NCBI: entry; OMA: entry
Species	Human	Mouse
Entrez	449520	n/a
Ensembl	ENSG00000204188	n/a
UniProt	n a	n/a
RefSeq (mRNA)	NM_001005478	n/a
RefSeq (protein)	n/a	n/a
Location (UCSC)	Chr 6: 33.54 – 33.59 Mb	n/a
PubMed search		n/a
- Wikidata
View/Edit Human

Gametogenetin binding protein 1 (pseudogene) is a protein that in humans is encoded by the GGNBP1 gene.

== Function ==
This gene is the ortholog of the mouse gametogenetin-binding protein 1 gene. In human, the open reading frame is disrupted by a nonsense mutation after 8-aa; consequently, this gene is currently considered to be a unitary pseudogene in human even though it is functional in other mammals. [provided by RefSeq, Aug 2009].
