= Prefoldin subunit 6 =

Protein-coding gene in the species Homo sapiens

PFDN6

Identifiers
- Aliases: PFDN6, H2-KE2, HKE2, KE-2, PFD6, prefoldin subunit 6
- External IDs: OMIM: 605660; MGI: 95908; HomoloGene: 40720; GeneCards: PFDN6; OMA:PFDN6 - orthologs

Gene location (Human)
Chr.	Chromosome 6 (human)
Band	6p21.32	Start	33,289,302 bp
Band	6p21.32	End	33,298,401 bp

Gene location (Mouse)
Chr.	Chromosome 17 (mouse)
Band	17 B1|17 17.98 cM	Start	34,157,795 bp
Band	17 B1|17 17.98 cM	End	34,159,317 bp
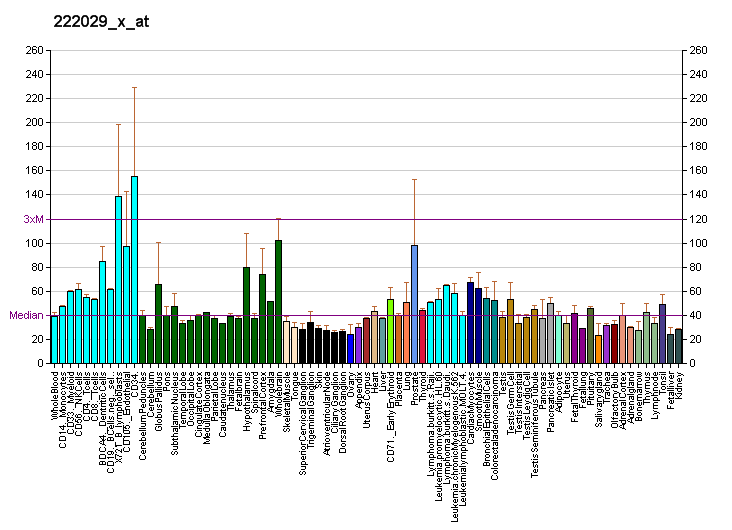
RNA expression pattern
Bgee	Human / Mouse (ortholog); Top expressed in: left testis; right testis; hypothalamus; islet of Langerhans; Brodmann area 9; hippocampus proper; amygdala; mucosa of transverse colon; substantia nigra; caudate nucleus / Top expressed in: primitive streak; yolk sac; epiblast; medial ganglionic eminence; neural layer of retina; fossa; morula; morula; embryo; condyle; More reference expression data
BioGPS	More reference expression data
Gene ontology
Molecular function	unfolded protein binding; chaperone binding
Cellular component	cytoplasm; prefoldin complex
Biological process	chaperone-mediated protein complex assembly; protein folding
Sources:Amigo / QuickGO
Orthologs
Species	Human	Mouse
Entrez	10471	14976
Ensembl	ENSG00000237335; ENSG00000204220; ENSG00000235692; ENSG00000206283; ENSG00000224782 n/a	ENSMUSG00000024309
UniProt	O15212; Q5STK2	Q03958
RefSeq (mRNA)	NM_014260; NM_001185181; NM_001265595; NM_001265596	NM_001185182; NM_010385
RefSeq (protein)	NP_001172110; NP_001252524; NP_001252525; NP_055075; NP_001172110.1 NP_001252524.1; NP_001252525.1; NP_055075.1	NP_001172111; NP_034515
Location (UCSC)	Chr 6: 33.29 – 33.3 Mb	Chr 17: 34.16 – 34.16 Mb
PubMed search
- Wikidata
View/Edit Human	View/Edit Mouse

Prefoldin subunit 6 is a protein that in humans is encoded by the PFDN6 gene.
