= FTH1P5 =

Ferritin, heavy polypeptide 1 pseudogene 5 is a protein that in humans is encoded by the FTH1P5 gene.
