= LOC100533655 =

Pseudogene in humans

Identifiers
- Aliases: LOC100533655 (gene)aryl hydrocarbon receptor pseudogene
- External IDs: GeneCards:
Orthologs
Databases	NCBI: entry
Species	Human	Mouse
Entrez	100533655	n/a
Ensembl	n/a	n/a
UniProt	n a	n/a
RefSeq (mRNA)	n/a	n/a
RefSeq (protein)	n/a	n/a
Location (UCSC)	n/a	n/a
PubMed search		n/a
- Wikidata
View/Edit Human

Aryl hydrocarbon receptor pseudogene (LOC100533655) is a pseudogene found in humans.
