= PSMB8 antisense RNA 1 =

Non-coding RNA in humans

PSMB8-AS1

Identifiers
- Aliases: PSMB8-AS1, TAP1-AS1, TAPSAR1, PSMB8 antisense RNA 1 (head to head)
- External IDs: GeneCards: PSMB8-AS1
Orthologs
Databases	NCBI: entry; OMA: entry
Species	Human	Mouse
Entrez	100507463	n/a
Ensembl	ENSG00000204261	n/a
UniProt	n a	n/a
RefSeq (mRNA)	n/a	n/a
RefSeq (protein)	n/a	n/a
Location (UCSC)	n/a	n/a
PubMed search		n/a
- Wikidata
View/Edit Human

PSMB8 antisense RNA 1 is a non-coding RNA that in humans is encoded by the gene PSMB8-AS1.
