= Androgen-dependent TFPI-regulating protein =

Protein-coding gene in the species Homo sapiens

An Error has occurred retrieving Wikidata item for infobox

Androgen-dependent TFPI-regulating protein is a protein in humans that is encoded by the ADTRP gene.
