= TP53COR1 =

Non-coding RNA in the species Homo sapiens

Identifiers
- Aliases: TP53COR1, TRP53COR1, linc-p21, lincRNA-p21, tumor protein p53 pathway corepressor 1 (non-protein coding), tumor protein p53 pathway corepressor 1
- External IDs: OMIM: 616343; GeneCards: TP53COR1
Orthologs
Databases	NCBI: entry
Species	Human	Mouse
Entrez	102800311	n/a
Ensembl	n/a	n/a
UniProt	n a	n/a
RefSeq (mRNA)	n/a	n/a
RefSeq (protein)	n/a	n/a
Location (UCSC)	n/a	n/a
PubMed search		n/a
- Wikidata
View/Edit Human

Tumor protein p53 pathway corepressor 1 (non-protein coding) is a non-protein coding gene that in humans is encoded by the TP53COR1 gene.
