= HCG4P11 =

Pseudogene in the species Homo sapiens

Identifiers
- Aliases: HCG4P11, HCGIV-11, HCGIV.10, HLA complex group 4 pseudogene 11
- External IDs: GeneCards: HCG4P11; OMA:HCG4P11 - orthologs
Orthologs
Species	Human	Mouse
Entrez	353020	n/a
Ensembl	n/a	n/a
UniProt	n a	n/a
RefSeq (mRNA)	n/a	n/a
RefSeq (protein)	n/a	n/a
Location (UCSC)	n/a	n/a
PubMed search		n/a
- Wikidata
View/Edit Human

HLA complex group 4 pseudogene 11, also known as HCG4P11, is a human gene.
