= ELFV dehydrogenase =

Glutamate/Leucine/Phenylalanine/Valine dehydrogenase
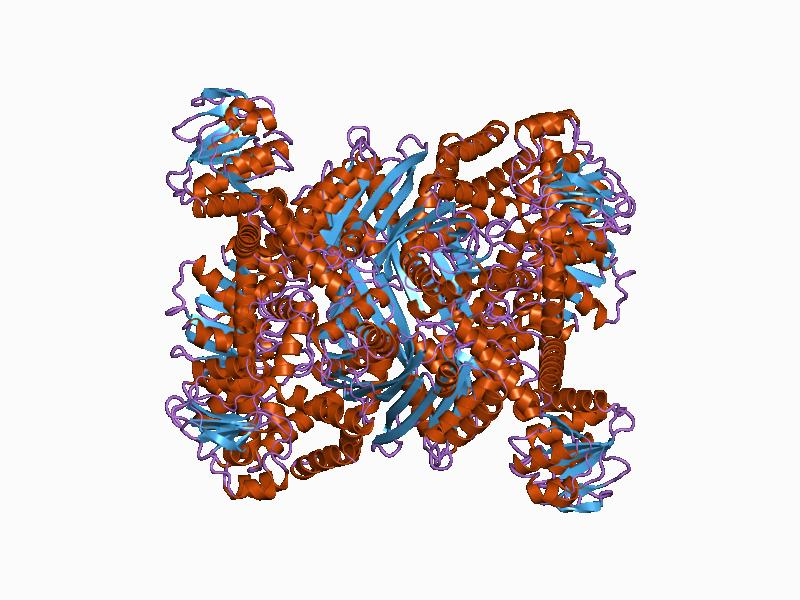
- thermotoga maritima glutamate dehydrogenase mutant n97d, g376k

Identifiers
- Symbol: ELFV_dehydrog
- Pfam: PF00208
- Pfam clan: CL0063
- InterPro: IPR006096
- PROSITE: PDOC00071
- SCOP2: 1leh / SCOPe / SUPFAM
Available protein structures:
- PDB: IPR006096 PF00208 (ECOD; PDBsum)
- AlphaFold: IPR006096; PF00208

Glu/Leu/Phe/Val dehydrogenase, dimerisation domain

Identifiers
- Symbol: ELFV_dehydrog_N
- Pfam: PF02812
- SCOP2: 1leh / SCOPe / SUPFAM
Available protein structures:
- PDB: PF02812 (ECOD; PDBsum)
- AlphaFold: PF02812

In molecular biology, the ELFV dehydrogenase family of enzymes include glutamate, leucine, phenylalanine and valine dehydrogenases. These enzymes are structurally and functionally related. They contain a Gly-rich region containing a conserved Lys residue, which has been implicated in the catalytic activity, in each case a reversible oxidative deamination reaction.

Glutamate dehydrogenases EC 1.4.1.2, EC 1.4.1.3 and EC 1.4.1.4 (GluDH) are enzymes that catalyse the NAD- and/or NADP-dependent reversible deamination of L-glutamate into alpha-ketoglutarate. GluDH isozymes are generally involved with either ammonia assimilation or glutamate catabolism. Two separate enzymes are present in yeasts: the NADP-dependent enzyme, which catalyses the amination of alpha-ketoglutarate to L-glutamate; and the NAD-dependent enzyme, which catalyses the reverse reaction - this form links the L-amino acids with the Krebs cycle, which provides a major pathway for metabolic interconversion of alpha-amino acids and alpha-keto acids.

Leucine dehydrogenase EC 1.4.1.9 (LeuDH) is a NAD-dependent enzyme that catalyses the reversible deamination of leucine and several other aliphatic amino acids to their keto analogues. Each subunit of this octameric enzyme from Bacillus sphaericus contains 364 amino acids and folds into two domains, separated by a deep cleft. The nicotinamide ring of the NAD+ cofactor binds deep in this cleft, which is thought to close during the hydride transfer step of the catalytic cycle.

Phenylalanine dehydrogenase EC 1.4.1.20 (PheDH) is an NAD-dependent enzyme that catalyses the reversible deamidation of L-phenylalanine into phenyl-pyruvate.

Valine dehydrogenase EC 1.4.1.8 (ValDH) is an NADP-dependent enzyme that catalyses the reversible deamidation of L-valine into 3-methyl-2-oxobutanoate.

These enzymes contain two domains, an N-terminal dimerisation domain, and a C-terminal domain.
