= BCKDK =

Protein-coding gene in the species Homo sapiens

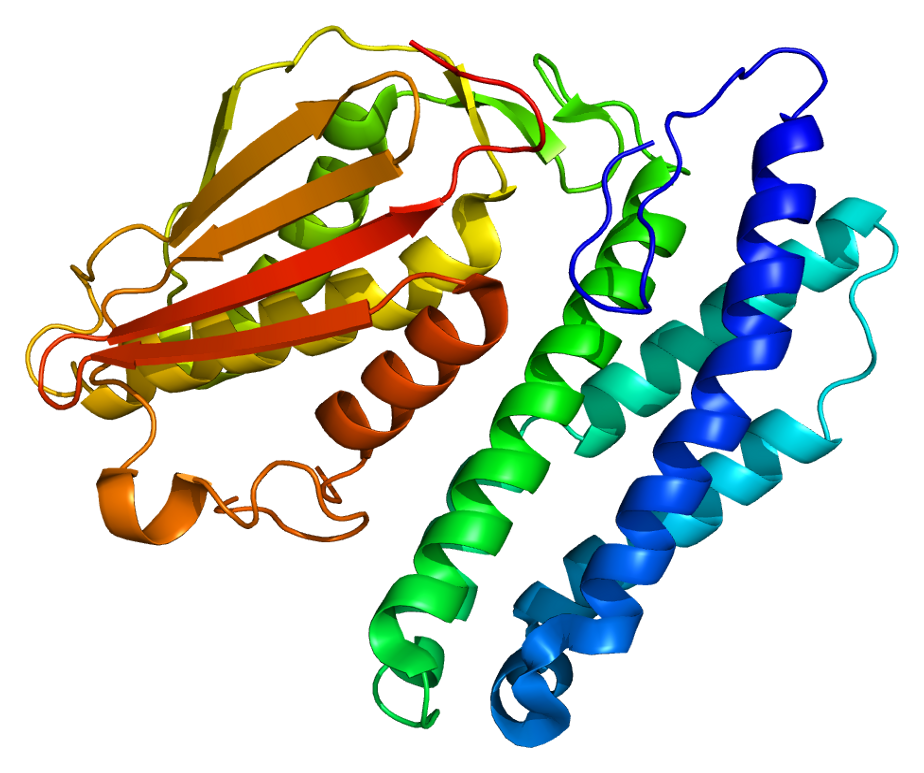

Identifiers
- Aliases: BCKDK, BCKDKD, BDK, branched chain ketoacid dehydrogenase kinase, branched chain keto acid dehydrogenase kinase
- External IDs: OMIM: 614901; MGI: 1276121; GeneCards: BCKDK
Enzyme activity
EC #	BRENDA	ExPASy	KEGG	MetaCyc
2.7.11.1	↗	↗	↗	↗
2.7.11.4	↗	↗	↗	↗

Gene location (Human)
Chr.	Chromosome 16 (human)
Band	16p11.2	Start	31,106,107 bp
Band	16p11.2	End	31,112,791 bp

Gene location (Mouse)
Chr.	Chromosome 7 (mouse)
Band	7|7 F3	Start	127,503,254 bp
Band	7|7 F3	End	127,509,393 bp
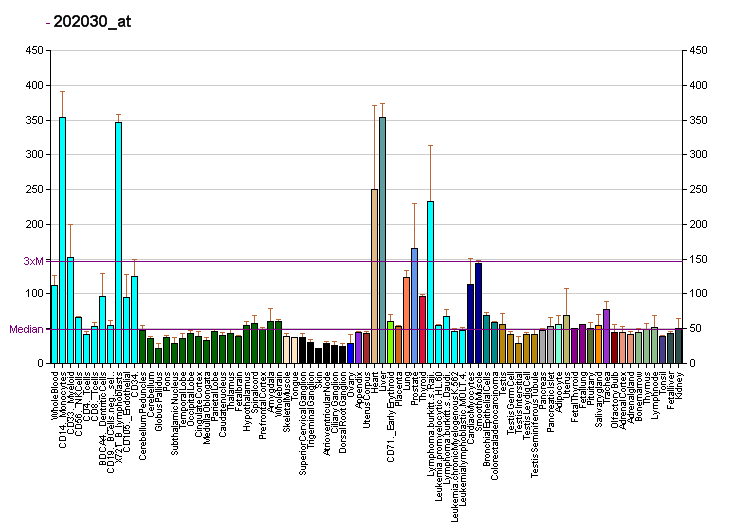
RNA expression pattern
Bgee	Human / Mouse (ortholog); Top expressed in: apex of heart; right adrenal gland; right adrenal cortex; body of pancreas; left adrenal gland; left adrenal cortex; gastrocnemius muscle; muscle of thigh; left ventricle; parotid gland / Top expressed in: lacrimal gland; muscle of thigh; saccule; parotid gland; yolk sac; otic vesicle; submandibular gland; otic placode; extensor digitorum longus muscle; right kidney; More reference expression data
BioGPS	More reference expression data
Gene ontology
Molecular function	transferase activity; nucleotide binding; protein serine/threonine kinase activity; protein kinase activity; transferase activity, transferring phosphorus-containing groups; protein binding; ATP binding; kinase activity; [3-methyl-2-oxobutanoate dehydrogenase (acetyl-transferring) kinase activity]
Cellular component	mitochondrial matrix; mitochondrial alpha-ketoglutarate dehydrogenase complex; mitochondrion
Biological process	protein phosphorylation; cellular amino acid catabolic process; branched-chain amino acid catabolic process; phosphorylation
Sources:Amigo / QuickGO
Orthologs
Databases	NCBI: entry; OMA: entry
Species	Human	Mouse
Entrez	10295	12041
Ensembl	ENSG00000103507	ENSMUSG00000030802
UniProt	O14874	O55028
RefSeq (mRNA)	NM_005881; NM_001122957; NM_001271926	NM_009739
RefSeq (protein)	NP_001116429; NP_001258855; NP_005872; NP_005872.2	NP_033869
Location (UCSC)	Chr 16: 31.11 – 31.11 Mb	Chr 7: 127.5 – 127.51 Mb
PubMed search
- Wikidata
View/Edit Human	View/Edit Mouse

Branched chain ketoacid dehydrogenase kinase (BCKDK) is an enzyme encoded by the BCKDK gene on chromosome 16. This enzyme is part of the mitochondrial protein kinases family and it is a regulator of the valine, leucine, and isoleucine catabolic pathways. BCKDK is found in the mitochondrial matrix and the prevalence of it depends on the type of cell. Liver cells tend to have the lowest concentration of BCKDK, whereas skeletal muscle cells have the highest amount. Abnormal activity of this enzyme often leads to diseases such as maple syrup urine disease and cachexia.

== Structure ==
BCKDK's structure consists of a characteristic nucleotide-binding domain along with a four-helix bundle domain similar to certain aspects of protein histidine kinases, which are involved in two-component signal transduction systems. BCKDK is also a dimer with a Leu389 residue located between the dimers and this dimerization is seen to be essential for its kinase activity and protein stability. Moreover, it is made up of 382 amino acids and has a molecular weight of 43 kDa. The gene BCKDK is located at 16p11.2, has an exon count of 11, and it lacks a TATA-box and an initiator element.

== Function ==
BCKDK regulates the activity of branched-chain α-ketoacid dehydrogenase complex (BCKD) through phosphorylation and inactivation. This inactivation results in increased branched-chain amino acids (BCAA), which is seen to reduce oxidative stress; however, having too much BCAA has been proven to be toxic to humans. Therefore, BCKDK is a vital tool to assist with BCAA homeostasis. As stated earlier, BCKDK concentrations vary depending on the type of tissue that is observed, whereas BCKD's concentration is the same in any tissue. Although BCKD concentration is constant, the amount of BCKDK determines the activity of the dehydrogenase complex. Since liver tissue is seen to have the lowest concentration of BCKDK, the activity of BCKD is seen to be the highest, delineating the fact that the BCKD kinase inversely affects the BCKD activity.

== Clinical significance ==
Abnormalities in BCKD activity often leads to pathological conditions which is why BCKDK is needed to regulate it. Often, mutations in the BCKDK gene occur creating the deviation in BCKD behavior. Exceedingly high BCKD complex activity increases branched-chain amino acid catabolism and protein degradation in skeletal muscle, which is a distinctive feature for cachexia. Deficiencies in BCKD activity have been the main cause in the rare metabolism maple syrup urine disease that can lead to mental retardation, brain edema, seizures, coma, and death if not treated correctly by lifelong limitation of branched-chain amino acid intake. Because BCKDK regulates BCKD which in turn catalyzes BCAA, BCKDK is one of the factors that determines the concentration of BCAA levels. High BCAA levels can lead to insulin resistance and can be a potential marker for type 2 diabetes. The amalgamation of BCAA can also lead to congenital heart diseases and heart failure. Furthermore, low levels of BCAA have been described as a cause of comorbid intellectual disability, autism, and epilepsy.

Deficiency of BCKDK, first described in 2012, is a disorder that could be considered as the "opposite" of maple syrup disease, because patients have decreased levels of branched-chain amino acids, instead of increased levels. The condition may present as autism with epileptiform abnormalities on EEG and seizures.

=== Therapeutics development ===
In 2023, Pfizer reported the development of the thiophene PF-07208254 as an allosteric BCKDK inhibitor that also promotes BCKDK degradation by promoting BCKDK interaction with BCKDH-E2. A variant of this molecule, PF-07328948, was disclosed in 2024 and is being evaluated as a clinical candidate for heart failure.

== Interactions ==
BCKDK has been seen to interact with:

- BCKD
