= BCKDHA =

Protein-coding gene in the species Homo sapiens

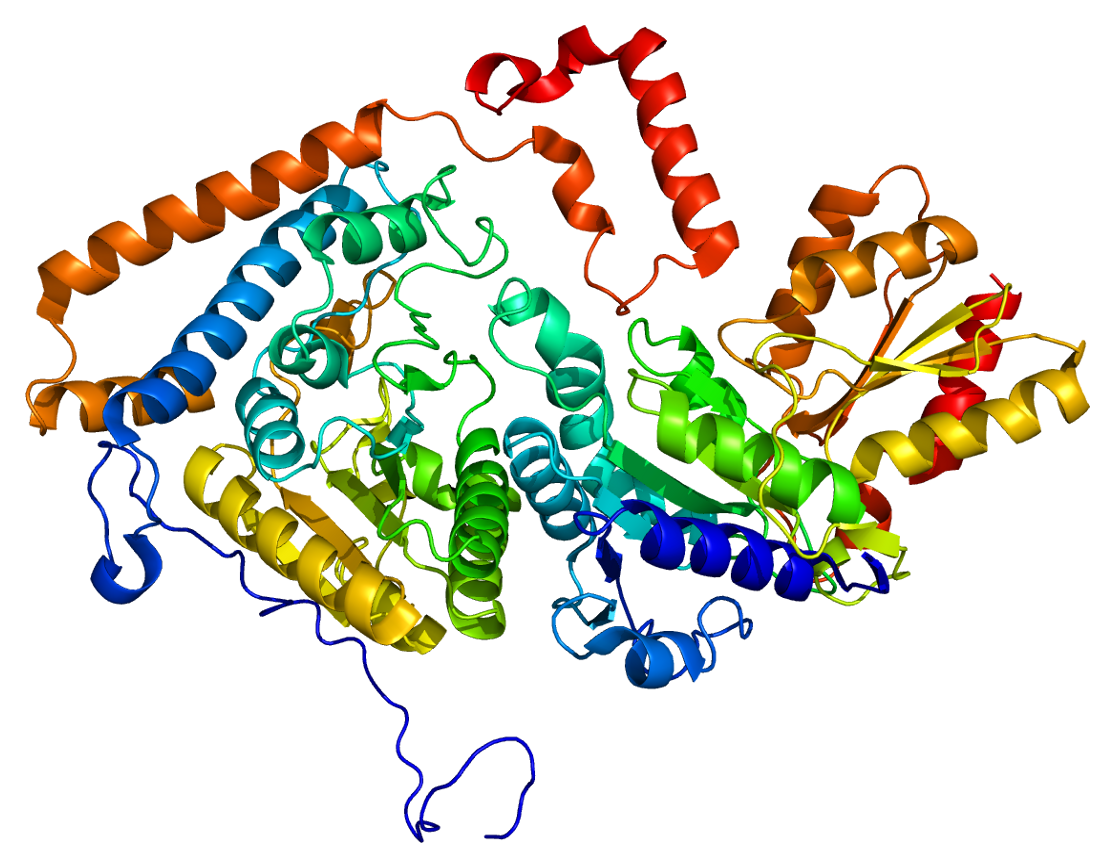

Identifiers
- Aliases: BCKDHA, BCKDE1A, MSU, MSUD1, OVD1A, branched chain keto acid dehydrogenase E1, alpha polypeptide, branched chain keto acid dehydrogenase E1 subunit alpha
- External IDs: OMIM: 608348; MGI: 107701; GeneCards: BCKDHA
Available structures
PDB	Ortholog search: PDBe RCSB
PDB	List of PDB id codes 1DTW, 1OLS, 1OLU, 1OLX, 1U5B, 1V11, 1V16, 1V1M, 1V1R, 1WCI, 1X7W, 1X7X, 1X7Y, 1X7Z, 1X80, 2BEU, 2BEV, 2BEW, 2BFB, 2BFC, 2BFD, 2BFE, 2BFF, 2J9F
Enzyme activity
EC #	BRENDA	ExPASy	KEGG	MetaCyc
1.2.4.4	↗	↗	↗	↗

Gene location (Human)
Chr.	Chromosome 19 (human)
Band	19q13.2	Start	41,397,808 bp
Band	19q13.2	End	41,425,002 bp

Gene location (Mouse)
Chr.	Chromosome 7 (mouse)
Band	7|7 A3	Start	25,329,371 bp
Band	7|7 A3	End	25,358,406 bp
RNA expression pattern
Bgee	Human / Mouse (ortholog); Top expressed in: right adrenal gland; apex of heart; right adrenal cortex; right lobe of liver; left adrenal gland; left adrenal cortex; left ventricle; gastrocnemius muscle; muscle of thigh; body of stomach / Top expressed in: right kidney; muscle of thigh; brown adipose tissue; right ventricle; human kidney; lacrimal gland; left lobe of liver; myocardium of ventricle; proximal tubule; salivary gland; More reference expression data
BioGPS	n/a
Gene ontology
Molecular function	oxidoreductase activity, acting on the aldehyde or oxo group of donors, disulfide as acceptor; protein binding; metal ion binding; oxidoreductase activity; carboxy-lyase activity; 3-methyl-2-oxobutanoate dehydrogenase (2-methylpropanoyl-transferring) activity
Cellular component	mitochondrial alpha-ketoglutarate dehydrogenase complex; mitochondrial matrix; mitochondrion
Biological process	metabolism; branched-chain amino acid catabolic process; cellular nitrogen compound metabolic process
Sources:Amigo / QuickGO
Orthologs
Databases	NCBI: entry; OMA: entry
Species	Human	Mouse
Entrez	593	12039
Ensembl	ENSG00000248098	ENSMUSG00000060376
UniProt	P12694	P50136
RefSeq (mRNA)	NM_001164783; NM_000709	NM_007533
RefSeq (protein)	NP_000700; NP_001158255	n/a
Location (UCSC)	Chr 19: 41.4 – 41.43 Mb	Chr 7: 25.33 – 25.36 Mb
PubMed search
- Wikidata
View/Edit Human	View/Edit Mouse

A 2-oxoisovalerate dehydrogenase subunit alpha, mitochondrial is an enzyme that in humans is encoded by the BCKDHA gene.

BCKDHA is a coding gene that is part of the BCKD complex (branched-chain alpha-keto acid dehydrogenase).

== Discovery ==
BCKDHA was discovered by John Menkes in 1954. After he had seen a family with four children die only a few months after birth, he found that their urine smelled sweet like maple syrup. While he was not the one to discover the specific gene, he did discover the maple syrup urine disease(MSUD). The BCKD complex is made up of three different catalytic pieces. It was in 1960 when Dancis discovered the gene itself, but this was from Menkes discovering of the disease leading to further investigation of its origin. He found that looking at the branched-chain amino acids and their corresponding alpha-keto acids in turn aided in the realization that they were pathogenetic compounds. Dancis was the one to specifically track down the enzymatic defect in (MSUD) by finding what gene in the pool of human chromosomes was defecting the urine. He found the gene on the level of the decarboxylation of the branched-chain amino acids.

== Gene location ==
The cytogenetic location of BCKDHA is on the human chromosome 19, specifically on the cytogenetic band at 19q13.2. This the long arm (q) of the chromosome 19 at 13.2. Looking at the molecular location, the base pairs 41,397,789 to 41,425,005 are on chromosome 19. The cellular localization of this gene is within the mitochondrion matrix.

== Function ==
The second major step in the catabolism of the branched-chain amino acids (isoleucine, leucine, and valine) is catalyzed by the branched-chain alpha-keto acid dehydrogenase complex (BCKD; EC 1.2.4.4), an inner-mitochondrial enzyme complex that consists of 3 catalytic components: a heterotetrameric (alpha2, beta2) branched-chain alpha-keto acid decarboxylase (E1), a homo-24-meric dihydrolipoyl transacylase (E2; MIM 248610), and a homodimeric dihydrolipoamide dehydrogenase (E3; MIM 238331). The reaction is irreversible and constitutes the first committed step in BCAA oxidation. The complex also contains 2 regulatory enzymes, a kinase and a phosphorylase. The BCKDHA gene encodes the alpha subunit of E1, and the BCKDHB gene (MIM 248611) encodes the beta subunit of E1.[supplied by OMIM]

The normal function of the BCKDHA gene is to provide instructions for making the alpha subunit of the branched-chain alpha-keto dehydrogenase (BCKD) enzyme complex. The alpha subunit is one part of the BCKD enzyme complex. Two beta subunits are produced from the BCKDHB gene and connect to two alpha subunits to form the E1 (decarboxylase) component. The BCKD enzyme complex catalyzes one step in breaking down amino acids. Those amino acids being leucine, isoleucine, and valine. The BCKD enzyme complex can be found in the mitochondria, an organelle known as the powerhouse of the cell. All three amino acids can be found in protein-rich foods and when broken down, they can be used for energy. Mutations in the BCKDHA gene can lead to maple syrup urine disease.

== Clinical significance ==
Mutations in the BCKDHA gene occur due to single point mutations in the “alpha subunit of the BCKD enzyme complex”. Earlier cases of this disease show the mutation more frequently occurred by replacing the amino acid tyrosine. This amino acid was replaced with asparagine. The complication with mutations in the BCKDHA gene is that it disrupts the normal function of the BCKD enzyme complex, preventing the gene from going about its normal functions. Thus, the BCKDHA gene would not be able to break down leucine, isoleucine, and valine. When these byproducts start to accumulate it produces a toxic environment for cells and tissues, specifically in the nervous system. This can lead to seizures, developmental delay, but most importantly maple syrup urine disease.

The BCKDHA has been pinpointed in people with maple syrup urine disease, due to over 80 mutations occurring in that gene. Severe symptoms arise from these mutations and cause the disease which shows soon after birth. Due to the sweet odor from the urine, the disease was termed maple syrup urine disease. The disease causes loss of appetite, nausea, lethargy, and delayed development.

=== BCKDHA mutation: maple syrup urine disease ===
Maple syrup urine disease is an “autosomal recessive inborn error of metabolism. Meaning, as stated earlier, that there is a defect (i.e. error) in the single gene that codes for an enzyme. These enzymes promote conversions for various substrates into products. In terms of maple syrup urine disease, the enzyme defect occurs in the metabolic pathway of the “branched-chain amino acids” leucine, isoleucine, and valine. The buildup of these amino acids lead to “encephalopathy and progressive neurodegeneration”; along with other complications.

There are five forms of maple syrup urine disease: classic, intermediate, intermittent, thiamine-responsive and E3 deficient. The form of disease is dependent upon clinical prognosis, dietary protein tolerance, and thiamine response and level of enzyme activity. Intermediate maple syrup urine disease is a milder form of maple syrup urine disease because it persistently raises branched-chain amino acids and some keto-acid chains. Individuals with this disease have a partial BCKDHA enzyme deficiency. Meaning that it shows up sporadically or reacts to dietary thiamine therapy.
