= BCAT2 =

Enzyme found in humans

Identifiers
- Aliases: BCAT2, BCAM, BCATM, BCT2, PP18, branched chain amino acid transaminase 2, HVLI
- External IDs: OMIM: 113530; MGI: 1276534; GeneCards: BCAT2
Available structures
PDB	Ortholog search: PDBe RCSB
PDB	List of PDB id codes 1EKF, 1EKP, 1EKV, 1KT8, 1KTA, 2A1H, 2HDK, 2HG8, 2HGW, 2HGX, 2HHF, 5BWR, 5BWT, 5BWU, 5BWV, 5BWW, 5BWX, 5CR5, 5I5Y, 5I5V, 5HNE, 5I5W, 5I5T, 5I5S, 5I5U, 5I5X, 5I60
Enzyme activity
EC #	BRENDA	ExPASy	KEGG	MetaCyc
2.6.1.42	↗	↗	↗	↗

Gene location (Human)
Chr.	Chromosome 19 (human)
Band	19q13.33	Start	48,795,062 bp
Band	19q13.33	End	48,811,029 bp

Gene location (Mouse)
Chr.	Chromosome 7 (mouse)
Band	7 B3|7 29.36 cM	Start	45,219,577 bp
Band	7 B3|7 29.36 cM	End	45,239,135 bp
RNA expression pattern
Bgee	Human / Mouse (ortholog); Top expressed in: right adrenal cortex; left adrenal gland; mucosa of transverse colon; left adrenal cortex; body of pancreas; body of stomach; right ovary; left ovary; apex of heart; gastric mucosa / Top expressed in: blastocyst; muscle of thigh; lip; right kidney; embryo; parotid gland; pyloric antrum; yolk sac; epiblast; embryo; More reference expression data
BioGPS	n/a
Gene ontology
Molecular function	transferase activity; L-valine transaminase activity; transaminase activity; L-leucine transaminase activity; L-isoleucine transaminase activity; catalytic activity; branched-chain-amino-acid transaminase activity
Cellular component	cytoplasm; mitochondrial matrix; mitochondrion
Biological process	regulation of hormone levels; branched-chain amino acid catabolic process; leucine metabolic process; cellular amino acid biosynthetic process; branched-chain amino acid biosynthetic process; branched-chain amino acid metabolic process; valine metabolic process; metabolism; isoleucine metabolic process; isoleucine catabolic process; valine biosynthetic process; leucine biosynthetic process; cellular response to leukemia inhibitory factor
Sources:Amigo / QuickGO
Orthologs
Databases	NCBI: entry; OMA: entry
Species	Human	Mouse
Entrez	587	12036
Ensembl	ENSG00000105552	ENSMUSG00000030826
UniProt	O15382	O35855
RefSeq (mRNA)	NM_001164773; NM_001190; NM_001284325	NM_001243052; NM_001243053; NM_009737
RefSeq (protein)	NP_001158245; NP_001181; NP_001271254	NP_001229981; NP_033867
Location (UCSC)	Chr 19: 48.8 – 48.81 Mb	Chr 7: 45.22 – 45.24 Mb
PubMed search
- Wikidata
View/Edit Human	View/Edit Mouse

Branched-chain-amino-acid transaminase 2 (BCAT2), also called branched-chain-amino-acid aminotransferase, mitochondrial (BCATM), is an enzyme that in humans is encoded by the gene BCAT2. This enzyme participates in the first step in breaking down the branched-chain amino acids: leucine, isoleucine, and valine. It differs from BCAT1, the other form of branched-chain amino acid aminotransferase (EC 2.6.1.42) found in humans, by being in the mitochondria instead of the cytoplasm.

== Function ==
This enzyme catalyzes the following catabolism reactions (EC 2.6.1.42):

L-leucine + 2-oxoglutarate = 4-methyl-2-oxopentanoate + L-glutamate
L-isoleucine + 2-oxoglutarate = (S)-3-methyl-2-oxopentanoate + L-glutamate
L-valine + 2-oxoglutarate = 3-methyl-2-oxobutanoate + L-glutamate

using pyridoxal 5'-phosphate (active vitamin B6) as a cofactor.

== Medical Significance ==
Pathogenic mutations in BCAT2 are associated with high levels of branched chain amino acids in the blood, a condition called hypervalinemia and hyperleucine-isoleucinemia (HVLI) or branched-chain aminotransferase deficiency. Symptoms are heterogeneous and relatively mild compared to maple syrup urine disease. Symptoms have included headaches and (mild) memory impairment. This disorder is inherited in an autosomal recessive manner and has had only eight cases reported in the research literature as of 2025.

BCAT2 also acts as a (HLA-I-type) minor histocompatibility antigen, which are proteins that impact the rate of tissue and organ transplant rejection. In particular, this is associated with the genetic variant rs11548193/LB-BCAT2-1R.
