= Leucine transaminase =

Identifiers
- EC no.: 2.6.1.6
- CAS no.: 9030-37-9

Databases
- IntEnz: IntEnz view
- BRENDA: BRENDA entry
- ExPASy: NiceZyme view
- KEGG: KEGG entry
- MetaCyc: metabolic pathway
- PRIAM: profile
- PDB structures: RCSB PDB PDBe PDBsum
- Gene Ontology: AmiGO / QuickGO
Search
- PMC: articles
- PubMed: articles
- NCBI: proteins

Leucine transaminase (EC 2.6.1.6) is an enzyme characterised from rat liver that catalyzes a reversible chemical reaction to interconvert L-leucine and α-ketoglutaric acid with α-ketoisocaproic acid and L-glutamic acid:

leucine
+
α-ketoglutaric acid
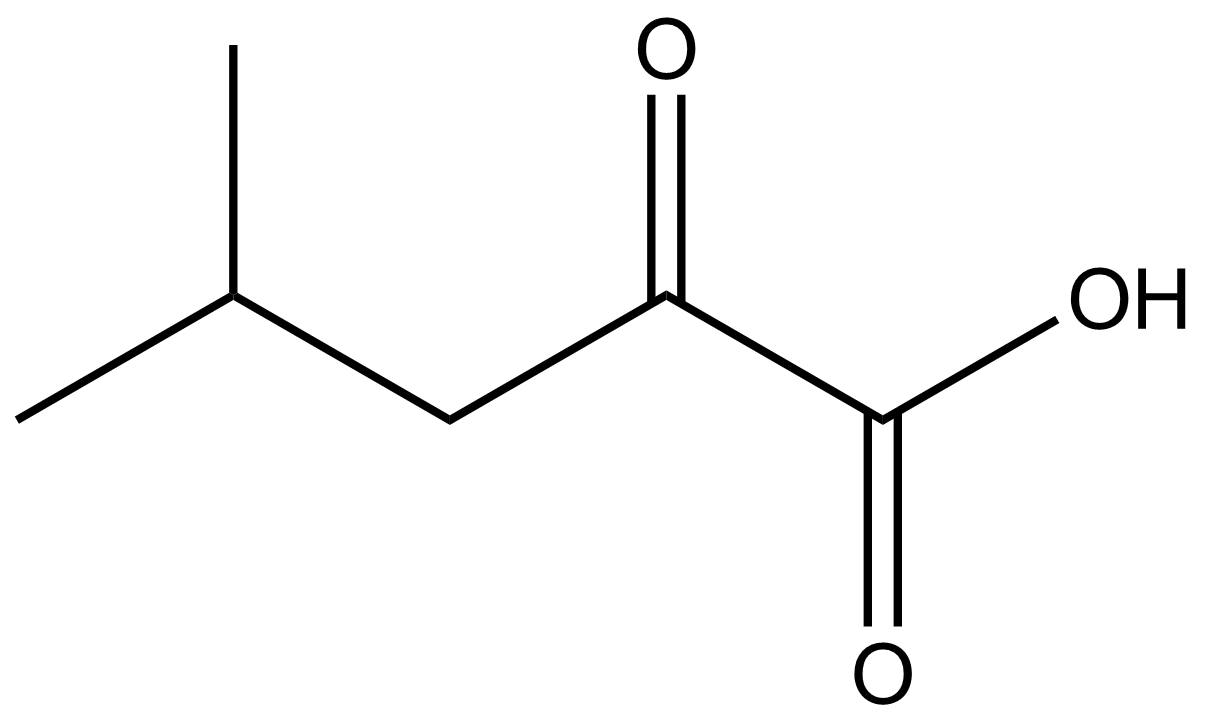
α-ketoisocaproic acid
+
glutamic acid

The enzyme is a transferase, specifically a transaminase, which transfer nitrogenous groups. The systematic name of this enzyme class is L-leucine:2-oxoglutarate aminotransferase. Other names in common use include L-leucine aminotransferase, leucine 2-oxoglutarate transaminase, leucine aminotransferase, and leucine-alpha-ketoglutarate transaminase. It employs one cofactor, pyridoxal phosphate.
