= Branched chain amino acid transaminase 1 =

Protein-coding gene in the species Homo sapiens

BCAT1

Identifiers
- Aliases: BCAT1, BCATC, BCT1, ECA39, MECA39, PNAS121, PP18, branched chain amino acid transaminase 1
- External IDs: OMIM: 113520; MGI: 104861; GeneCards: BCAT1
Available structures
PDB	Ortholog search: PDBe RCSB
PDB	List of PDB id codes 2ABJ, 2COG, 2COI, 2COJ
Enzyme activity
EC #	BRENDA	ExPASy	KEGG	MetaCyc
2.6.1.42	↗	↗	↗	↗

Gene location (Human)
Chr.	Chromosome 12 (human)
Band	12p12.1	Start	24,810,024 bp
Band	12p12.1	End	24,949,101 bp

Gene location (Mouse)
Chr.	Chromosome 6 (mouse)
Band	6 G3|6 77.27 cM	Start	144,939,561 bp
Band	6 G3|6 77.27 cM	End	145,021,910 bp
RNA expression pattern
Bgee	Human / Mouse (ortholog); Top expressed in: tibia; synovial joint; retinal pigment epithelium; pars compacta; endothelial cell; pars reticulata; lateral nuclear group of thalamus; tendon of biceps brachii; lower lobe of lung; visceral pleura / Top expressed in: cumulus cell; facial motor nucleus; otic placode; medulla oblongata; deep cerebellar nuclei; medial vestibular nucleus; dorsal tegmental nucleus; pontine nuclei; inferior colliculi; habenula; More reference expression data
BioGPS	n/a
Gene ontology
Molecular function	transaminase activity; L-leucine transaminase activity; identical protein binding; catalytic activity; L-valine transaminase activity; L-isoleucine transaminase activity; transferase activity; branched-chain-amino-acid transaminase activity
Cellular component	cytoplasm; mitochondrion; cytosol
Biological process	metabolism; branched-chain amino acid biosynthetic process; cell population proliferation; cellular amino acid biosynthetic process; branched-chain amino acid metabolic process; leucine biosynthetic process; branched-chain amino acid catabolic process; valine biosynthetic process; G1/S transition of mitotic cell cycle
Sources:Amigo / QuickGO
Orthologs
Databases	NCBI: entry; OMA: entry
Species	Human	Mouse
Entrez	586	12035
Ensembl	ENSG00000060982	ENSMUSG00000030268
UniProt	P54687	P24288
RefSeq (mRNA)	NM_001178091; NM_001178092; NM_001178093; NM_001178094; NM_005504	NM_001024468; NM_007532
RefSeq (protein)	NP_001171562; NP_001171563; NP_001171564; NP_001171565; NP_005495	NP_001019639; NP_031558
Location (UCSC)	Chr 12: 24.81 – 24.95 Mb	Chr 6: 144.94 – 145.02 Mb
PubMed search
- Wikidata
View/Edit Human	View/Edit Mouse

Branched chain amino acid transaminase 1 is a protein that in humans is encoded by the BCAT1 gene. It is the first enzyme in the branched-chain amino acid (BCAA) degradation pathway and facilitates the reversible transamination of BCAAs and glutamate. BCAT1 resides in the cytoplasm, while its isoform, BCAT2, is found in the mitochondria.

== Function ==
This gene encodes the cytosolic form of the enzyme branched-chain amino acid transaminase. This enzyme catalyzes the reversible transamination of branched-chain alpha-keto acids (BCKAs) to the branched-chain amino acids (BCAAs) valine, leucine and isoleucine, which are essential for cell growth. In humans, its primary role is the deamination of BCAAs, as humans lack the enzymes for de novo synthesis of BCKAs. The respective cosubstrates are alpha-ketoglutarate and glutamate. The respective reactions are:

L-leucine + 2-oxoglutarate = 4-methyl-2-oxopentanoate + L-glutamate

L-isoleucine + 2-oxoglutarate = (S)-3-methyl-2-oxopentanoate + L-glutamate

L-valine + 2-oxoglutarate = 3-methyl-2-oxobutanoate + L-glutamate

Cells can further degrade BCKAs by the branched-chain keto acid dehydrogenase complex from which the carbon backbones of each BCAA may enter distinct degradation pathways.

The oncogenic transcription factor Myc is frequently reported to drive BCAT1 expression.

== Clinical significance ==
Overexpression of BCAT1 has been associated with a variety of cancers, among them glioblastoma, breast cancer, acute myeloid leukemia, gastric cancer and chronic myeloid leukemia.
