= 2-methylacyl-CoA dehydrogenase =

Class of enzymes

Identifiers
- EC no.: 1.3.99.12
- CAS no.: 85130-32-1

Databases
- IntEnz: IntEnz view
- BRENDA: BRENDA entry
- ExPASy: NiceZyme view
- KEGG: KEGG entry
- MetaCyc: metabolic pathway
- PRIAM: profile
- PDB structures: RCSB PDB PDBe PDBsum
- Gene Ontology: AmiGO / QuickGO
Search
- PMC: articles
- PubMed: articles
- NCBI: proteins

In enzymology, a 2-methylacyl-CoA dehydrogenase (EC 1.3.99.12) is an enzyme that catalyzes the chemical reaction

2-methylbutanoyl-CoA + acceptor $\rightleftharpoons$ 2-methylbut-2-enoyl-CoA + reduced acceptor

Thus, the two substrates of this enzyme are 2-methylbutanoyl-CoA and acceptor, whereas its two products are 2-methylbut-2-enoyl-CoA and reduced acceptor.

This enzyme belongs to the family of oxidoreductases, specifically those acting on the CH-CH group of donor with other acceptors. The systematic name of this enzyme class is 2-methylbutanoyl-CoA:acceptor oxidoreductase. Other names in common use include branched-chain acyl-CoA dehydrogenase, 2-methyl branched chain acyl-CoA dehydrogenase, and 2-methylbutanoyl-CoA:(acceptor) oxidoreductase. This enzyme participates in valine, leucine and isoleucine degradation.
