= Leucine dehydrogenase =

leucine dehydrogenase
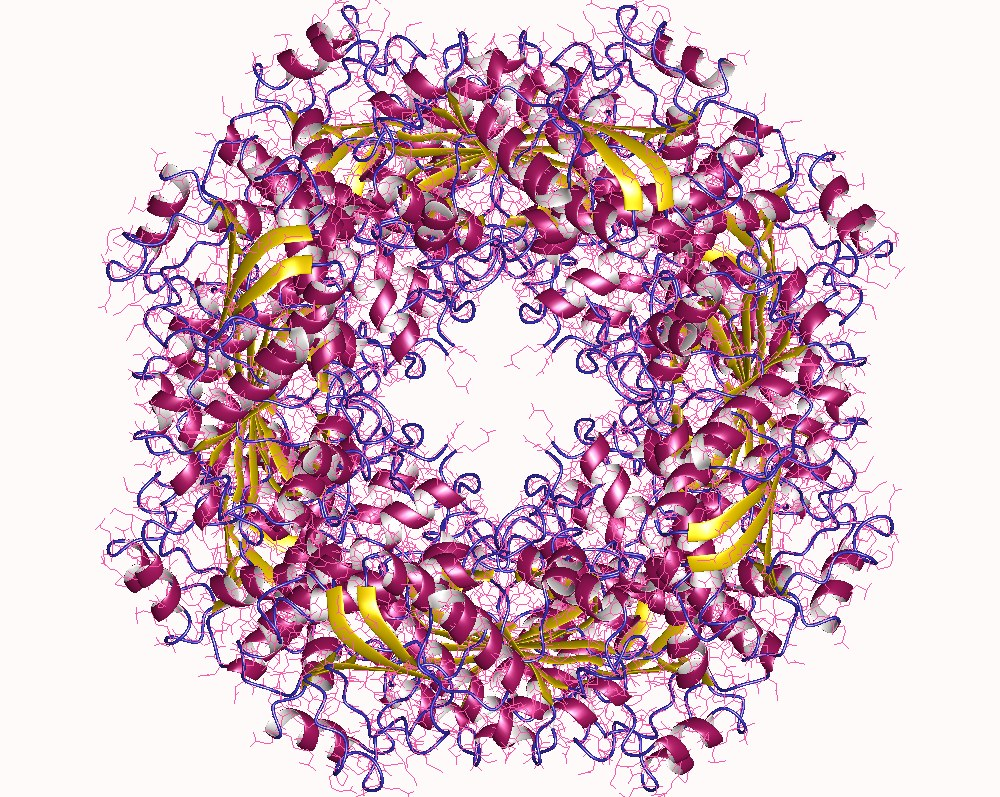
- leucine dehydrogenase oktamer, Sporosarcina psychrophila

Identifiers
- EC no.: 1.4.1.9
- CAS no.: 9082-71-7

Databases
- IntEnz: IntEnz view
- BRENDA: BRENDA entry
- ExPASy: NiceZyme view
- KEGG: KEGG entry
- MetaCyc: metabolic pathway
- PRIAM: profile
- PDB structures: RCSB PDB PDBe PDBsum
- Gene Ontology: AmiGO / QuickGO
Search
- PMC: articles
- PubMed: articles
- NCBI: proteins

In enzymology, leucine dehydrogenase (EC 1.4.1.9) is an enzyme that catalyzes the chemical reaction

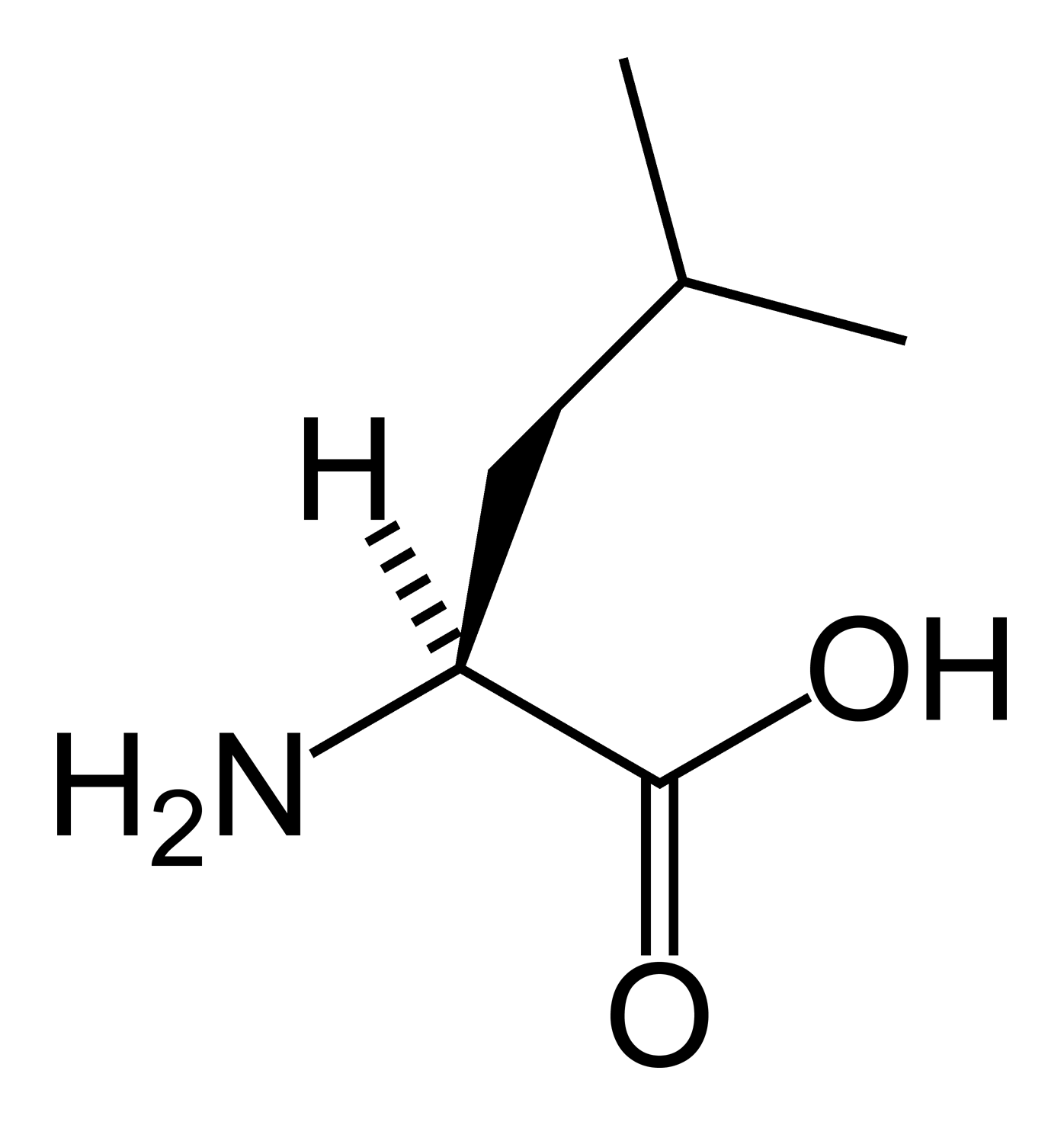
Leucine
+ NAD^{+}
H_{2}O
H^{+}
H_{2}O
H^{+}
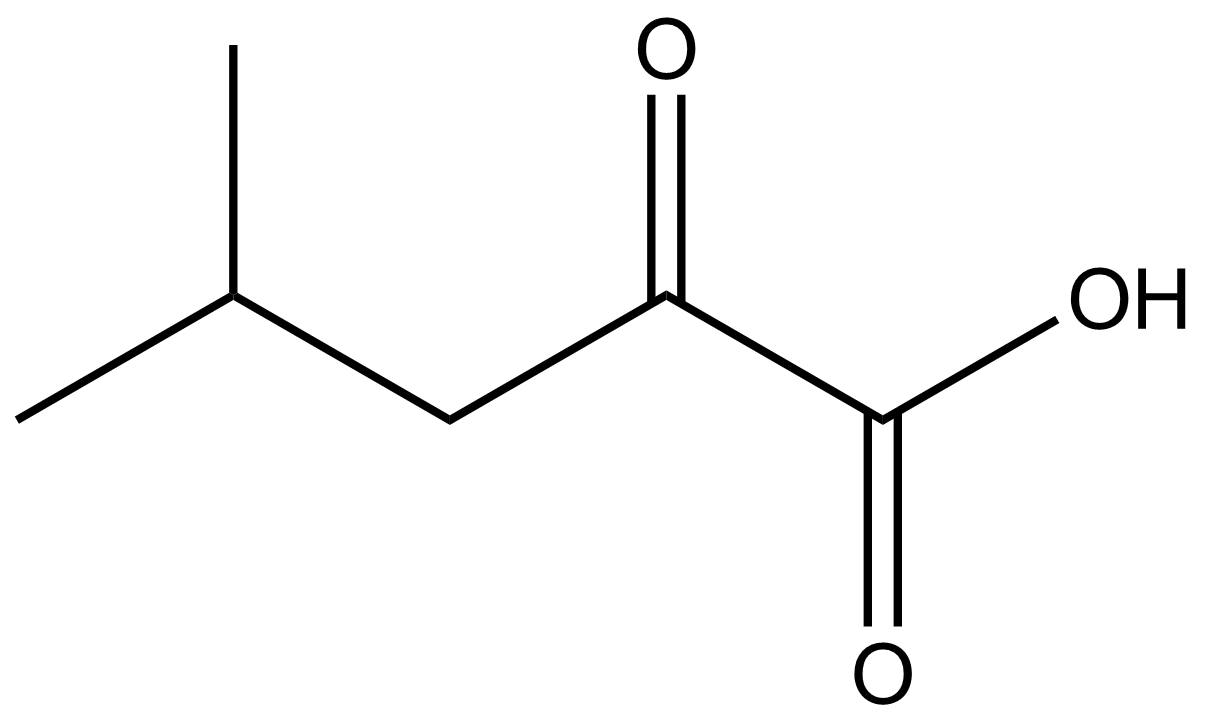
α-Ketoisocaproic acid
+ NADH + NH_{3}

The substrates of this enzyme are L-leucine, water, and oxidised nicotinamide adenine dinucleotide (NAD^{+}). Its products are α-ketoisocaproic acid, reduced NADH ammonia, and a proton.

This enzyme belongs to the family of oxidoreductases, specifically those acting on the CH-NH_{2} group of donors with NAD^{+} or NADP^{+} as acceptor. The systematic name of this enzyme class is L-leucine:NAD^{+} oxidoreductase (deaminating). Other names in common use include L-leucine dehydrogenase, L-leucine:NAD^{+} oxidoreductase, deaminating, and LeuDH. This enzyme participates in valine, leucine and isoleucine degradation and valine, leucine and isoleucine biosynthesis.

== Structural studies ==
As of late 2007, only one structure has been solved for this class of enzymes, with the PDB accession code 1LEH.
