= DBT (gene) =

Protein-coding gene in humans

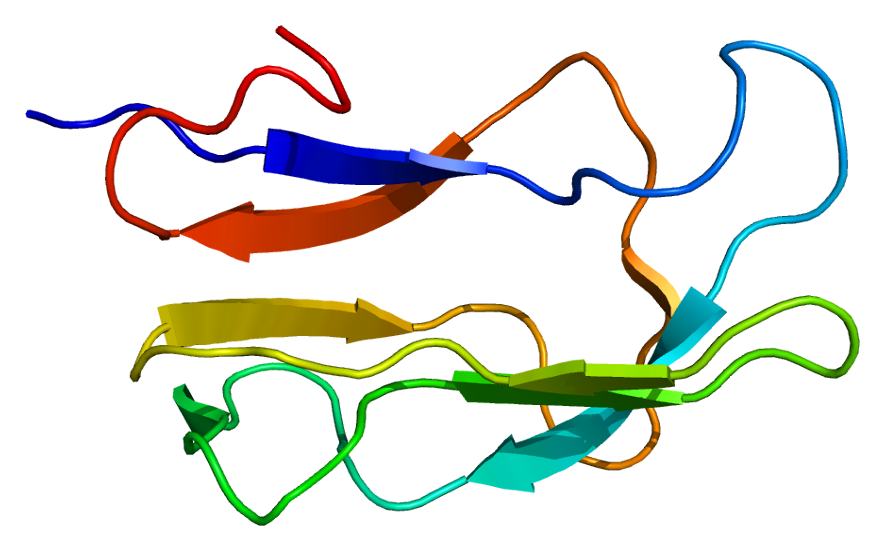

Identifiers
- Aliases: DBT, BCATE2, BCKAD-E2, BCKADE2, E2, E2B, BCOADC-E2, dihydrolipoamide branched chain transacylase E2, BCKDH-E2
- External IDs: OMIM: 248610; MGI: 105386; GeneCards: DBT
Available structures
PDB	Ortholog search: PDBe RCSB
PDB	List of PDB id codes 1K8M, 1K8O, 1ZWV, 2COO, 3RNM
Enzyme activity
EC #	BRENDA	ExPASy	KEGG	MetaCyc
2.3.1.168	↗	↗	↗	↗

Gene location (Human)
Chr.	Chromosome 1 (human)
Band	1p21.2	Start	100,186,919 bp
Band	1p21.2	End	100,249,834 bp

Gene location (Mouse)
Chr.	Chromosome 3 (mouse)
Band	3 G1|3 50.37 cM	Start	116,306,719 bp
Band	3 G1|3 50.37 cM	End	116,343,630 bp
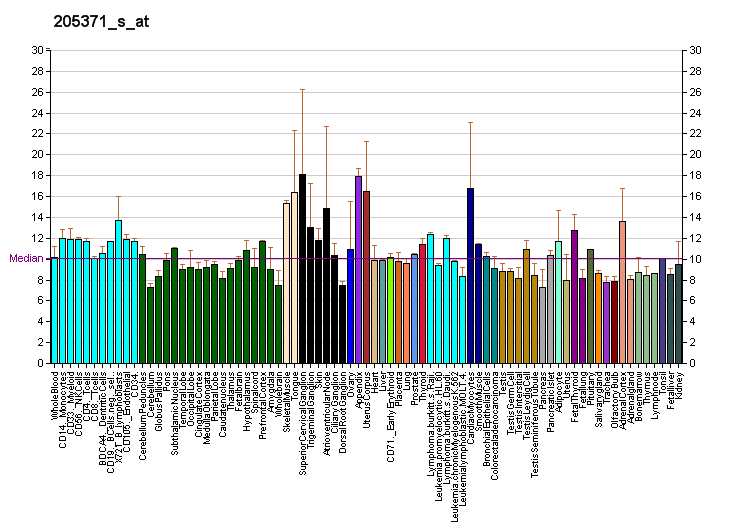

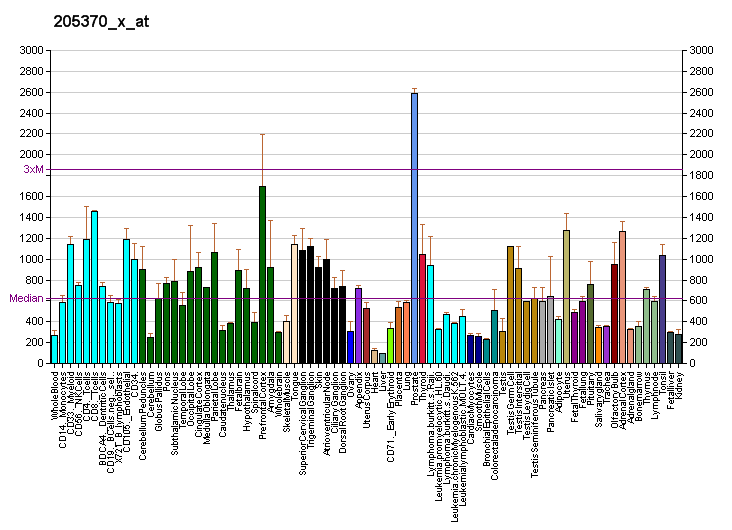

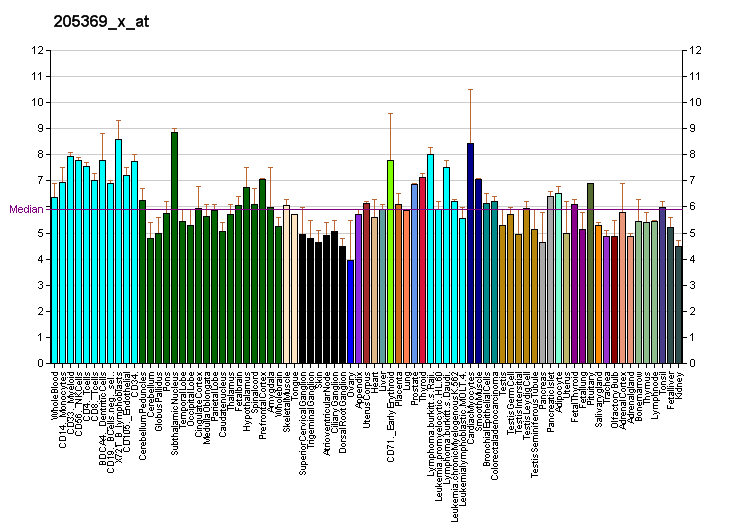
RNA expression pattern
Bgee	Human / Mouse (ortholog); Top expressed in: buccal mucosa cell; renal medulla; endothelial cell; cardia; ventral tegmental area; nipple; pylorus; trigeminal ganglion; external globus pallidus; inferior ganglion of vagus nerve / Top expressed in: brown adipose tissue; parotid gland; intercostal muscle; left lobe of liver; lacrimal gland; epithelium of stomach; retinal pigment epithelium; human kidney; right kidney; myocardium of ventricle; More reference expression data
BioGPS	More reference expression data
Gene ontology
Molecular function	acyltransferase activity; ubiquitin protein ligase binding; transferase activity; dihydrolipoyllysine-residue (2-methylpropanoyl)transferase activity; acetyltransferase activity; lipoic acid binding
Cellular component	mitochondrial matrix; mitochondrial alpha-ketoglutarate dehydrogenase complex; mitochondrial nucleoid; mitochondrion; cytoplasm
Biological process	metabolism; branched-chain amino acid catabolic process
Sources:Amigo / QuickGO
Orthologs
Databases	NCBI: entry; OMA: entry
Species	Human	Mouse
Entrez	1629	13171
Ensembl	ENSG00000137992	ENSMUSG00000000340
UniProt	P11182	P53395
RefSeq (mRNA)	NM_001918	NM_010022; NM_001357344
RefSeq (protein)	NP_001909	NP_034152; NP_001344273
Location (UCSC)	Chr 1: 100.19 – 100.25 Mb	Chr 3: 116.31 – 116.34 Mb
PubMed search
- Wikidata
View/Edit Human	View/Edit Mouse

Lipoamide acyltransferase component of branched-chain alpha-keto acid dehydrogenase complex, mitochondrial is an enzyme that in humans is encoded by the DBT gene.

The branched-chain alpha-keto acid dehydrogenase complex (BCKD) is an inner-mitochondrial enzyme complex involved in the breakdown of the branched-chain amino acids isoleucine, leucine, and valine. The BCKD complex is thought to be composed of a core of 24 transacylase (E2) subunits, and associated decarboxylase (E1), dehydrogenase (E3), and regulatory subunits. This gene encodes the transacylase (E2) subunit. Mutations in this gene result in maple syrup urine disease, type 2. Alternatively spliced transcript variants have been described, but their biological validity has not been determined.
