= BCKDHB =

Protein-coding gene in the species Homo sapiens

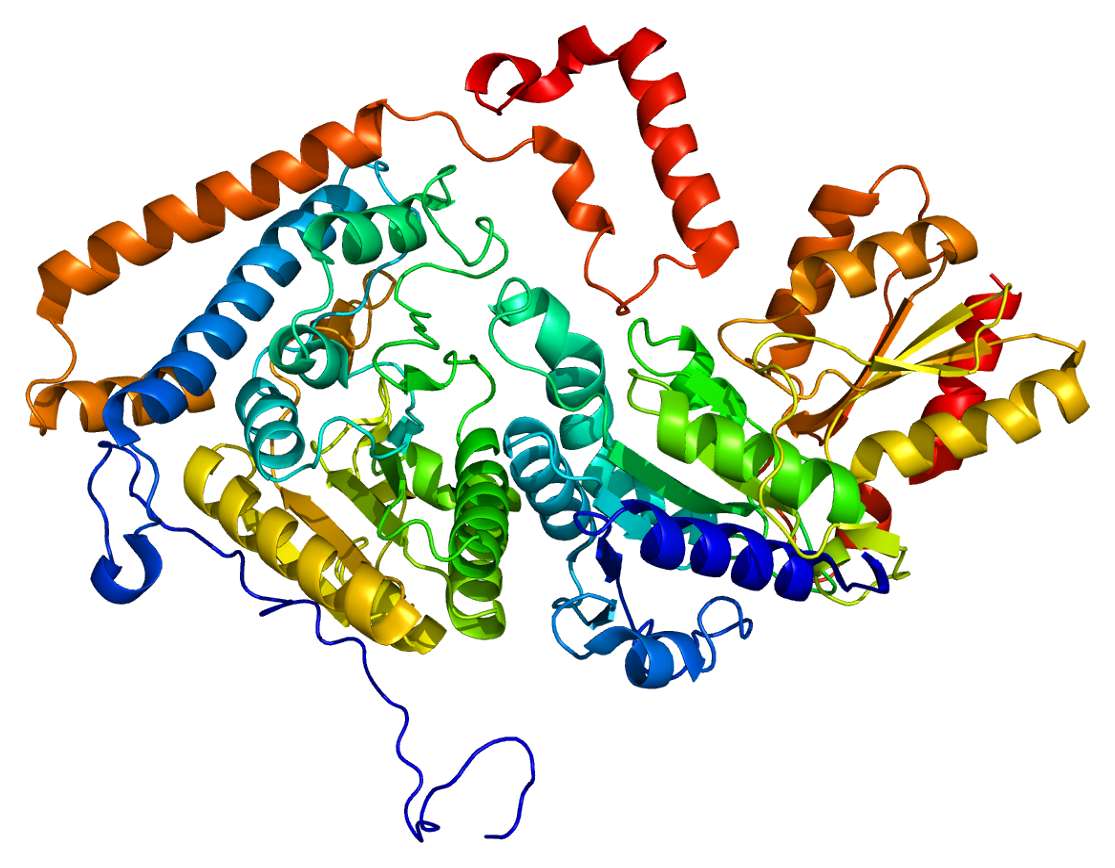

Identifiers
- Aliases: BCKDHB, E1B, dJ279A18.1, BCKDE1B, BCKDH E1-beta, branched chain keto acid dehydrogenase E1, beta polypeptide, branched chain keto acid dehydrogenase E1 subunit beta
- External IDs: OMIM: 248611; MGI: 88137; GeneCards: BCKDHB
Available structures
PDB	Ortholog search: PDBe RCSB
PDB	List of PDB id codes 1DTW, 1OLS, 1OLU, 1OLX, 1U5B, 1V11, 1V16, 1V1M, 1V1R, 1WCI, 1X7W, 1X7X, 1X7Y, 1X7Z, 1X80, 2BEU, 2BEV, 2BEW, 2BFB, 2BFC, 2BFD, 2BFE, 2BFF, 2J9F
Enzyme activity
EC #	BRENDA	ExPASy	KEGG	MetaCyc
1.2.4.4	↗	↗	↗	↗

Gene location (Human)
Chr.	Chromosome 6 (human)
Band	6q14.1	Start	80,106,647 bp
Band	6q14.1	End	80,346,270 bp

Gene location (Mouse)
Chr.	Chromosome 9 (mouse)
Band	9|9 E2	Start	83,807,198 bp
Band	9|9 E2	End	84,006,293 bp
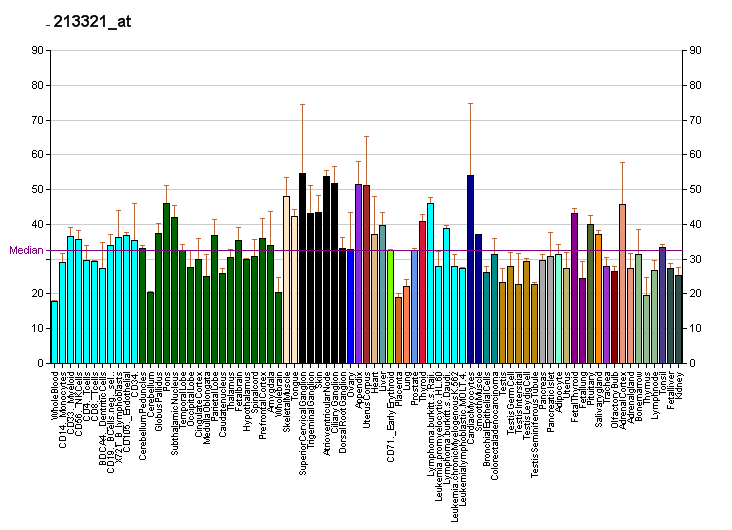

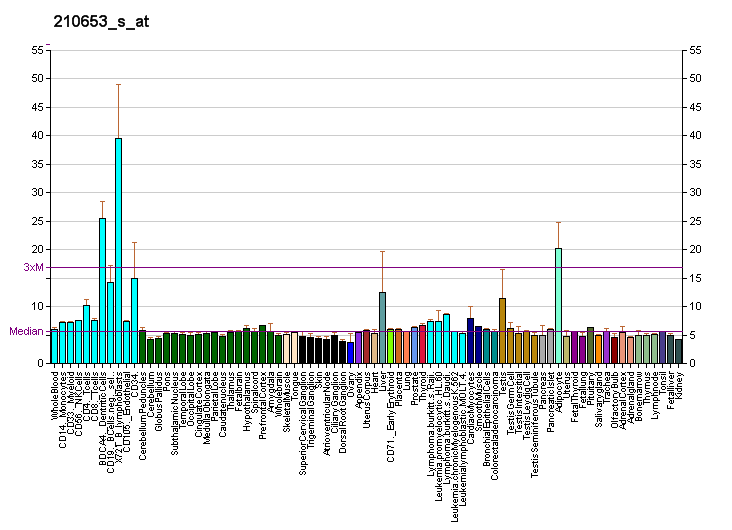
RNA expression pattern
Bgee	Human / Mouse (ortholog); Top expressed in: right lobe of liver; rectum; mucosa of transverse colon; Achilles tendon; olfactory zone of nasal mucosa; ventricular zone; popliteal artery; tibial arteries; body of stomach; left ventricle / Top expressed in: left lobe of liver; brown adipose tissue; white adipose tissue; epithelium of stomach; myocardium of ventricle; interventricular septum; plantaris muscle; subcutaneous adipose tissue; cardiac muscles; parotid gland; More reference expression data
BioGPS	More reference expression data
Gene ontology
Molecular function	oxidoreductase activity; protein binding; 3-methyl-2-oxobutanoate dehydrogenase (2-methylpropanoyl-transferring) activity; catalytic activity
Cellular component	mitochondrial matrix; mitochondrial alpha-ketoglutarate dehydrogenase complex; mitochondrion
Biological process	metabolism; branched-chain amino acid catabolic process; response to nutrient
Sources:Amigo / QuickGO
Orthologs
Databases	NCBI: entry; OMA: entry
Species	Human	Mouse
Entrez	594	12040
Ensembl	ENSG00000083123	ENSMUSG00000032263
UniProt	P21953	Q6P3A8
RefSeq (mRNA)	NM_000056; NM_183050; NM_001318975	NM_199195; NM_001305935
RefSeq (protein)	NP_000047; NP_001305904; NP_898871	NP_001292864; NP_954665
Location (UCSC)	Chr 6: 80.11 – 80.35 Mb	Chr 9: 83.81 – 84.01 Mb
PubMed search
- Wikidata
View/Edit Human	View/Edit Mouse

2-Oxoisovalerate dehydrogenase subunit beta, mitochondrial is an enzyme that in humans is encoded by the BCKDHB gene.

== Function ==
Branched-chain keto acid dehydrogenase is a multienzyme complex associated with the inner membrane of mitochondria, and functions in the catabolism of branched-chain amino acids. The complex consists of multiple copies of 3 components: branched-chain alpha-keto acid decarboxylase (E1), lipoamide acyltransferase (E2), and lipoamide dehydrogenase (E3). This gene encodes the E1 beta subunit, and mutations therein have been associated with maple syrup urine disease (MSUD), type 1B. Alternative splicing at this locus results in transcript variants with different 3' noncoding regions, but encoding the same isoform.
