= Α-Ketoisocaproic acid =

α-Ketoisocaproic acid
- Skeletal formula of alpha-ketoisocaproic acid

Names
- IUPAC name 4-Methyl-2-oxopentanoic acid
- Systematic IUPAC name 4-Methyl-2-oxopentanoic acid
- Other names 4-Methyl-2-oxovaleric acid 2-Ketoisocaproic acid 2-Oxo-4-methylpentanoic acid 2-Oxo-4-methylvaleric acid 2-Oxoisocaproic acid 2-Oxoleucine; Isobutylglyoxylic acid Ketoleucine α-Ketoisocapronic acid α-Oxoisocaproic acid

Identifiers
CAS Number	816-66-0
3D model (JSmol)	Interactive image; Interactive image
Beilstein Reference	1701823
ChEBI	CHEBI:48430
ChEMBL	ChEMBL445647
ChemSpider	69
DrugBank	DB03229
ECHA InfoCard	100.011.304
EC Number	212-435-5
IUPHAR/BPS	4656
KEGG	C00233
MeSH	Alpha-ketoisocaproic+acid
PubChem CID	70
UNII	4GUJ8AH400
UN number	3265
CompTox Dashboard (EPA)	DTXSID6061157
- InChI: InChI=1S/C6H10O3/c1-4(2)3-5(7)6(8)9/h4H,3H2,1-2H3,(H,8,9) Key: BKAJNAXTPSGJCU-UHFFFAOYSA-N; InChI=1/C6H10O3/c1-4(2)3-5(7)6(8)9/h4H,3H2,1-2H3,(H,8,9) Key: BKAJNAXTPSGJCU-UHFFFAOYAG
- SMILES: CC(C)CC(=O)C(O)=O; O=C(C(=O)O)CC(C)C

Properties
Chemical formula	C_{6}H_{10}O_{3}
Molar mass	130.143 g·mol^{−1}
Density	1.055 g cm^{−3} (at 20 °C)
Melting point	8 to 10 °C (46 to 50 °F; 281 to 283 K)
Boiling point	85 °C (185 °F; 358 K) at 13 mmHg
log P	0.133
Acidity (pK_{a})	2.651
Basicity (pK_{b})	11.346

Hazards
- GHS labelling
Pictograms	(GHS05: Corrosive)
Signal word	Danger
Hazard statements	H314
Precautionary statements	P260, P264, P280, P301+P330+P331, P303+P361+P353, P304+P340, P305+P351+P338, P310, P321, P363, P405, P501
- Except where otherwise noted, data are given for materials in their standard state (at 25 °C [77 °F], 100 kPa). verify (what is ?) Infobox references

α-Ketoisocaproic acid (α-KIC), also known as 4-methyl-2-oxovaleric acid, and its conjugate base and carboxylate, α-ketoisocaproate, are metabolic intermediates in the metabolic pathway for L-leucine. Leucine is an essential amino acid, and its degradation is critical for many biological duties. α-KIC is produced in one of the first steps of the pathway by branched-chain amino acid aminotransferase by transferring the amine on L-leucine onto alpha ketoglutarate, and replacing that amine with a ketone. The degradation of L-leucine in the muscle to this compound allows for the production of the amino acids alanine and glutamate as well. In the liver, α-KIC can be converted to a vast number of compounds depending on the enzymes and cofactors present, including cholesterol, acetyl-CoA, isovaleryl-CoA, and other biological molecules. Isovaleryl-CoA is the main compound synthesized from ɑ-KIC. α-KIC is a key metabolite present in the urine of people with Maple syrup urine disease, along with other branched-chain amino acids. Derivatives of α-KIC have been studied in humans for their ability to improve physical performance during anaerobic exercise as a supplemental bridge between short-term and long-term exercise supplements. These studies show that α-KIC does not achieve this goal without other ergogenic supplements present as well. α-KIC has also been observed to reduce skeletal muscle damage after eccentrically biased resistance exercises in people who do not usually perform those exercises.

== Biological activity ==
=== Supplements ===
α-KIC has been studied as a nutritional supplement to aid in the performance of strenuous physical activity. Studies have shown that taking ɑ-KIC and its derivatives before acute physical activity led to an increase in muscle work by 10%, as well as a decrease in muscle fatigue during the early phase of the physical activity. When taken with other supplements over a two-week period, such as beta-hydroxy beta-methylbutyrate (HMB), participants reported delayed onset of muscle soreness, as well as other positive effects such as increased muscle girth. Studies have also suggested that ɑ-KIC taken alone did not have any significant positive impacts on physical performance, so it should be taken in conjunction with other ergogenic substances. ɑ-KIC is not available as a supplement on its own, but its decarboxylated form HMB is available in calcium salt capsules or powder.

=== Applications ===
The biochemical implications of α-KIC are largely connected to other biochemical pathways. Protein Synthesis, skeletal muscle regeneration, and skeletal muscle proteolysis have all been noted to change when ɑ-KIC is taken. There is not much research into the specific mechanisms taking part in these processes, but there is a noticeable correlation between ɑ-KIC ingestion and increased skeletal muscle protein synthesis, regeneration, and proteolysis.

== Toxicity ==
Multiple studies have demonstrated that there have been no adverse effects on humans nor animals that ingested α-KIC or HMB.

In patients with maple syrup urine disease, who are unable to metabolize the branched chain alpha keto acids, α-KIC is believed to be one of the key mediators of neurotoxicity.

== Medical use ==
Branched-chain alpha-keto acids such as α-KIC are found in high concentrations in the urine of people who suffer from Maple Syrup Urine Disease. This is disease is caused by a partial branched-chain alpha-keto acid dehydrogenase deficiency, which leads to a buildup of branched-chain alpha-keto acids, including α-KIC and HMB. These keto-acids build up in the liver, and since limited isovaleryl-CoA can be produced, these keto-acids must be excreted in the urine as α-KIC, HMB, and many other similar keto acids. Flare-ups in people who have this condition are caused due to poor diet. Symptoms of Maple Syrup Urine Disease include sweet smelling urine, irritability, lethargy, and in serious cases edema of the brain, apnea, coma, or respiratory failure. Treatment includes lowering leucine intake and a specialized diet to make up for the lack of leucine ingestion.

== Leucine metabolism ==
Leucine metabolism in humans

Human metabolic pathway for HMB and isovaleryl-CoA relative to L-leucine. Of the two major pathways, L-leucine is mostly metabolized into isovaleryl-CoA, while only about 5% is metabolized into HMB.
