= Maple syrup urine disease =

Autosomal recessive metabolic disorder

- Other names: Branched-chain ketoaciduria
- Leucine (pictured above), Isoleucine (pictured below), and valine are the branched-chain amino acids that build up in MSUD.
- Specialty: Medical genetics, Dietetics
- Frequency: 0.0005%

Maple syrup urine disease (MSUD) is a rare, inherited metabolic disorder that affects the body's ability to metabolize amino acids due to a deficiency in the activity of the branched-chain alpha-ketoacid dehydrogenase (BCKAD) complex. It particularly affects the metabolism of amino acids leucine, isoleucine, and valine. With MSUD, the body is not able to properly break down these amino acids, therefore leading to the amino acids to build up in urine and become toxic. The condition gets its name from the distinctive sweet odor of affected infants' urine and earwax due to the buildup of these amino acids.

== Classification ==
Maple syrup urine disease can be classified by its pattern of signs and symptoms or by its genetic cause. The most common and severe form of this disease is the classic type, which appears soon after birth, and as long as it remains untreated, gives rise to progressive and unremitting symptoms. Variant forms of the disorder may become apparent only later in infancy or childhood, with typically less severe symptoms that may only appear during times of fasting, stress, or illness, but still involve mental and physical problems if left untreated.

There are five main types of maple syrup urine disease:

- Classic maple syrup urine disease
- Intermediate maple syrup urine disease
- Intermittent maple syrup urine disease
- Thiamine-responsive maple syrup urine disease
- E3-deficient maple syrup urine disease

These types can be classified based on time of onset, severity of symptoms, and level of BCKAD complex enzyme activity. Generally, the majority of patients will be classified into one of these five categories but some patients affected by maple syrup urine disease do not fit the criteria for the listed sub-divisions and may be categorized into unclassified maple syrup urine disease.

=== Classic ===
Classic MSUD is the most common type of MSUD. It also has the earliest onset and is presented with the most severe symptoms. Symptoms can be seen from within 7–10 days of birth. The maple syrup odor to the earwax is apparent around 12 hours after birth. The sweet-smelling urine is presented around a week after birth when protein metabolism has accelerated. Some other signs that may be seen are poor feeding, vomiting, irritability, lethargy, apnea, seizures, acidosis, and encephalopathy.

Infants with classic MSUD will display subtle symptoms within the first 24–48 hours. Subtle symptoms include poor feeding, either bottle or breast, lethargy, and irritability. The infant will then experience increased focal neurologic signs. These neurologic signs include athetosis, hypertonia, spasticity, and opisthotonus that lead to convulsions and coma. If MSUD is left untreated, central neurologic function and respiratory failure will occur and lead to death. Although MSUD can be stabilized, there are still threats of metabolic decompensation and loss of bone mass that can lead to osteoporosis, pancreatitis, and intracranial hypertension. Additional signs and symptoms that can be associated with classic MSUD include intellectual limitation and behavioral issues.

=== Intermediate ===
This type is a milder form of MSUD in comparison to classic MSUD. Intermediate MSUD has greater levels of residual enzyme activity than classic MSUD. The majority of children with intermediate MSUD are diagnosed between the ages of 5 months and 7 years. Symptoms associated with classic MSUD also appear in intermediate MSUD. Maple syrup odor to the urine and earwax is observed. Patients with intermediate MSUD may be presented with acidosis and developmental delay.

=== Intermittent ===
Contrary to classic and intermediate MSUD, intermittent MSUD individuals will have normal growth and intellectual development. This type of MSUD is typically presented around 1 to 2 years of life. Other symptoms may include ataxia and semicoma. These symptoms may accelerate and worsen rapidly. Symptoms of lethargy and characterized odor of maple syrup will occur when the individual experiences stress, does not eat or develops an infection. The metabolic crisis leading to seizures, coma, and brain damage is still a possibility.

=== Thiamine-response ===
Symptoms associated with thiamine-response MSUD are similar to intermediate MSUD. Newborns rarely present with symptoms. This is a distinctive type of MSUD because they respond very well to thiamine therapy. Symptoms may include acidosis and developmental delay.

=== E3-Deficient ===
This type of MSUD is diagnosed from the deficiencies of the E3 subunit. Variants in the E3 subunit tend to cause more severe symptoms than other subunit variants, and can cause congenital lactic acidosis that is termed DLD deficiency. There may be varying level of enzyme activity.

=== Later onset ===
The symptoms of MSUD may also present later depending on the severity of the disease. Untreated in older individuals, and during times of metabolic crisis, symptoms of the condition include uncharacteristically inappropriate, extreme or erratic behavior and moods, hallucinations, lack of appetite, weight loss, anemia, diarrhea, vomiting, dehydration, lethargy, oscillating hypertonia and hypotonia, ataxia, seizures, hypoglycaemia, ketoacidosis, opisthotonus, pancreatitis, rapid neurological decline, and coma. Death from cerebral oedema will likely occur if there is no treatment. Additionally, MSUD patients experience an abnormal course of diseases in simple infections that can lead to permanent damage.

== Signs and symptoms ==
Signs and symptoms of MSUD vary between patients and are greatly related to the amount of residual enzyme activity. Some characteristics of MSUD include maple syrup odor to the urine or earwax, neurological disorders, psychological disorders, feeding problems, and metabolic acidosis. If left untreated, it may lead to metabolic crisis. Metabolic crises can be life-threatening and should be treated immediately.

== Causes ==
Maple syrup urine disease has an autosomal recessive pattern of inheritance.

Mutations in the following genes cause maple syrup urine disease:

- BCKDHA (OMIM: 608348)
- BCKDHB (OMIM: 248611)
- DBT (OMIM: 248610)
- DLD (OMIM: 238331)

These four genes produce proteins that work together as the branched-chain alpha-keto acid dehydrogenase complex. The complex is essential for breaking down the amino acids leucine, isoleucine, and valine. These are present in some quantity in almost all kinds of food, but in particular, protein-rich foods such as dairy products, meat, fish, soy, gluten, eggs, nuts, whole grains, seeds, avocados, algae, edible seaweed, beans, and pulses. Mutation in any of these genes reduces or eliminates the function of the enzyme complex, preventing the normal breakdown of isoleucine, leucine, and valine. As a result, these amino acids and their by-products build up in the body. Because high levels of these substances are toxic to the brain and other organs, this accumulation leads to the serious medical problems associated with maple syrup urine disease.

This condition has an autosomal recessive inheritance pattern, which means the defective gene is located on an autosome, and two copies of the gene – one from each parent – must be inherited to be affected by the disorder. The parents of a child with an autosomal recessive disorder are carriers of one copy of the defective gene, but are usually unaffected by the disorder.

== Pathophysiology ==
=== Enzyme deficiency ===
MSUD is a metabolic disorder caused by a deficiency of the branched-chain alpha-keto acid dehydrogenase complex (BCKAD) activity, leading to a buildup of the branched-chain amino acids (leucine, isoleucine, and valine) and their toxic branched-chain alpha-keto acid by-products (α-ketoisocaproic, α-ketoisovaleric, α-keto-β-methylavaleric acids ) in the blood and urine. The buildup of these BCAAs will lead to the maple syrup odor in earwax and urine that is associated with MSUD. The BCKAD complex begins by breaking down leucine, isoleucine, and valine through the use of branch-chain aminotransferase (BCAT) into their relevant α-ketoacids. The second step involves the conversion of α-ketoacids into acetoacetate, acetyl-CoA, and succinyl-CoA through oxidative decarboxylation of α-ketoacids. The BCKAD complex consists of four subunits designated E_{1}α, E_{1}β, E_{2}, and E_{3}. The E_{3} subunit is also a component of pyruvate dehydrogenase complex and oxoglutarate dehydrogenase complex. MSUD can result from mutations in any of the genes that code for these enzyme subunits, E_{1}α, E_{1}β, E_{2}, and E_{3}. Mutations of these enzyme subunits will lead to the BCKAD complex being unable to break down leucine, isoleucine, and valine. The levels of these branched-chain amino acids will become elevated and lead to the symptoms associated with MSUD.

This enzymatic dysfunction leads to various types of psychiatric disorders, movement disorders, seizures, and encephalopathy. A recent review article attributes these pathological states to being caused by lower concentrations of protein and neurotransmitter synthesis within the central nervous system, as well as toxicity due to the buildup of branched-chain amino acids (BCAA) and branched-chain alpha-keto acid (BCKA). There are multiple mechanisms theorized for MSUD encephalopathy.

=== Amino acid transport deficiency and neurotransmitter synthesis impairment ===
Amino acid transport deficiency and neurotransmitter synthesis impairment are significant concerns in individuals with maple syrup urine disease. Reduced levels of amino acids such as glutamate, phenylalanine, tyrosine, tryptophan, methionine, and alanine in the central nervous system have been shown to affect learning, memory, emotional behavior (including major depressive and anxiety disorders), ADHD, OCD, and movement disorders

In a normal physiological state, large neutral amino acids (LNAA) are transferred from the blood to the brain via the large amino acid transporter (LAT1/SLC7A5) at the blood-brain barrier. However, increased plasma levels and higher affinity of leucine may saturate LAT1, thereby competitively preventing the transportation of other amino acids, resulting in lower concentrations within the brain. Amino acids such as isoleucine, valine, threonine, methionine, glutamine, tyrosine, phenylalanine, tryptophan, and histidine are particularly affected. Methionine, a precursor for S-adenosylmethionine, is essential for one-carbon metabolism in the brain, while other LAT1-transported amino acids are involved in the synthesis of neurotransmitters, including histamine, serotonin, dopamine, and norepinephrine.

Increased plasma concentrations of branched-chain keto acids (BCKA) are transported through the blood–brain barrier via the monocarboxylate transporter (MCT/SLC16A1). Elevated levels of alpha-ketoisocaproate (α-KIC) result in a reduction in glutamate, glutamine, and GABA. Additionally, an influx of alpha-ketoisocaproic acid transported by a monocarboxylate transporter (MCT) across the blood–brain barrier, may deplete glutamate and glutamine in astrocytes, an important type of glial cell, through transamination (via BCAT). Glutamate levels are maintained in the brain by BCAA metabolism functions and if not properly maintained can lead to neurological problems that are seen in MSUD individuals.

Another aspect of MSUD pathology involves the impact of elevated BCAA and BCKA on sodium-potassium ATPase activity, leading to electrolyte imbalances that contribute to cerebral edema and seizures. High leucine levels can disrupt water homeostasis in the brain's subcortical gray matter, potentially causing cerebral edema due to hyponatremia linked to increased levels of atrial natriuretic peptide and vasopressin.

=== Neurotoxicity ===
Neurotoxic effects have been observed in experimental studies linking the accumulation of BCAA and BCKA to the neuropathology seen in individuals with MSUD. Recent review articles have expanded on the neurotoxicity associated with MSUD, highlighting its contribution to changes in cellular bioenergetics (via disruption of the citric acid cycle in mitochondria), oxidative stress, and pro-inflammatory states. Changes have been observed in various markers related to each respective state. For cellular bioenergetics, changes include lactate levels, creatine levels, NAD+/NADH ratio (nicotinamide adenine dinucleotide), ATP (adenosine triphosphate) and pyruvate concentrations, mitochondrial complex activity, and CK (creatine kinase) activity. In oxidative stress, changes are seen in GSH (glutathione), MDA (malondialdehyde), TAR (total antioxidant response), nitric oxide, DNA oxidative damage levels, and the enzymatic activity of GPS (glutathione peroxidase), GR (glutathione reductase), CAT (catalase), and SOD (superoxide dismutase). For the pro-inflammatory state, biomarker changes are seen in IL-6 (interleukin-6), IL-10 (interleukin-10), IL-1beta (interleukin-1 beta), TNF-gamma (tumor necrosis factor-gamma), TNF-alpha (tumor necrosis factor-alpha), sICAM-1 (soluble intercellular adhesion molecule-1), sVCAM-1 (soluble vascular cell adhesion molecule-1), and cathepsin levels. These neurotoxic changes have been linked to the activation of neuronal apoptotic pathways, leading to cell death and morphological changes in the brain.

== Diagnosis ==
Initially, the diagnosis was commonly made based on suggestive symptoms and odor, the odor coming from the compound sotolon (sometimes spelled sotolone). These days, affected individuals are now often identified by characteristic elevations on plasma amino acid which do not have the characteristic odor.

=== Prenatal diagnostic testing ===
The preferred prenatal diagnostic method is molecular analysis which requires a mutational analysis to measure BCKAD (branched-chain alpha-keto acid dehydrogenase) enzyme activity in chorion villus cells or amniocytes. Another measurement method is BCAA (branched-chain amino acid) concentration in amniotic fluids.

=== Newborn screening ===
On May 9, 2014, the UK National Screening Committee (UK NSC) announced its recommendation to screen every newborn baby in the UK for four further genetic disorders as part of its NHS Newborn Blood Spot Screening programme, including maple syrup urine disease. The disease is estimated to affect 1 out of 185,000 infants worldwide and its frequency increases with certain heritages.

Newborn screening for maple syrup urine disease involves analyzing the blood of 1–2 day-old newborns through tandem mass spectrometry. The blood concentration of leucine and isoleucine is measured relative to other amino acids to determine if the newborn has a high level of branched-chain amino acids. Once the newborn is 2–3 days old the blood concentration of branched-chain amino acids like leucine is greater than 1000 μmol/L and alternative screening methods are used. Instead, the newborn's urine is analyzed for levels of branched-chain alpha-hydroxyacids and alpha-ketoacids.

Other diagnostic methods include additional laboratory studies which include gas and liquid chromatography, BCKAD (branched-chain alpha-keto acid dehydrogenase) enzyme activity, dinitrophenylhydrazine (DNPH) test, and molecular testing. Gas chromatography-mass spectrometry, urine test strips and the DNPH test can detect urinary organic acid that supports the diagnosis of MSUD.

Branched-chain-ketoacids can be detected by the DNPH test, where the DNPH reagent and urine get mixed equally and are observed for ten minutes to see color and precipitation changes. After ten minutes, if a yellow-white precipitate is displayed, it is a positive result. If a clear precipitate is displayed, it is a negative result.

If a newborn screening was not performed, the result of the newborn screening is a false negative, or the newborn was not treated after a positive result, the clinical findings can be maple syrup odor twelve hours after birth. Four to five days after birth, other signs can present, such as stereotyped movements like "fencing" and "bicycling" along with worsening encephalopathy including lethargy, irregular apnea, and opisthotonus. Seven to ten days after birth, respiratory failure and coma can happen.

=== Classification ===
MSUD has five clinical phenotypes that are very distinct from one another. The most common and severe is the classical type with low residual activity from 0–2% of normal. Milder types include intermediate and intermittent with higher residual activities from 3–30% of the normal. Most unique is the thiamine-responsive type, where patients respond to high doses of thiamine administered, although this method is controversial. Lastly, the E-3 deficient type is correlated to combined enzyme deficiencies in pyruvate dehydrogenase, BCKD complexes, and alpha-ketoglutarate dehydrogenase, since E3 is common within mitochondrial alpha-ketoacid dehydrogenase complexes.

NBS (newborn screening) detects most individuals with intermediate MSUD, but those who were not screened as newborns can be later diagnosed with MSUD. In these individuals, plasma BCAA concentrations are similar to those who have classic MSUD. However, they have better leucine tolerance, and during acute metabolic decompensation episodes, they do not require intensive nutritional support. Severe metabolic intoxication with significant encephalopathy and leucinosis can occur if subjected to serious catabolic stress.

== Prevention ==
There are no methods for preventing the manifestation of the pathology of MSUD in infants with two defective copies of the BCKD gene. However, genetic counselors may consult with couples to screen for the disease via DNA testing. DNA testing is also available to identify the disease in an unborn child in the womb.

== Treatment ==
=== Monitoring ===
Keeping MSUD under control requires careful monitoring of blood chemistry, both at home and in a hospital setting. DNPH or specialized dipsticks may be used to test the patient's urine for ketones (a sign of metabolic decompensation), when metabolic stress is likely or suspected. Fingerstick tests are performed regularly and sent to a laboratory to determine blood levels of leucine, isoleucine, and valine. Regular metabolic consultations, including blood draws for full nutritional analysis, are recommended; especially during puberty and periods of rapid growth. MSUD management also involves a specially tailored metabolic formula, a modified diet, and lifestyle precautions such as avoiding fatigue and infections, as well as consuming regular, sufficient calories in proportion to physical stress and exertion. Without sufficient calories, catabolism of muscle protein will result in a metabolic crisis. Those with MSUD must be hospitalized for intravenous infusion of sugars and nasogastric drip-feeding of formula, in the event of metabolic decompensation, or lack of appetite, diarrhea or vomiting. Food avoidance, rejection of formula, and picky eating are all common problems with MSUD. Some patients may need to receive all or part of their daily nutrition through a feeding tube.

Appropriate Branched-Chain Amino Acid (BCAA) blood concentrations:

LEU plasma concentrations for infants and children 5 years old and younger should be between 75-200 mmol/L. For anyone 5 years or older LEU plasma concentrations should maintain between 75-300 mmol/L to maintain mental status. LEU is key for protein synthesis involved with growth, repair, and health maintenance.

ILE and VAL plasma concentrations should ideally be between 200-400 mmol/L to maintain metabolic balance and avoid BCAA deficits. Isoleucine and Valine help promote anabolism which decreases plasma Leucine concentrations.

=== Toxin removal ===
Following diagnosis, rapid removal of excess leucine from the body reduces the impact of the disease on development. Some methods of toxin removal include Exchange transfusion, hemodialysis, or hemofiltration. Exchange transfusion is an option to consider because it decreases high BCAA levels without disrupting the plasma repeatedly, however after exchange the BCAA levels will increase with the tissue storage releasing BCAAs. Hemodialysis is a safe and effective way to reduce elevated BCAA levels while correcting electrolyte and acid-base imbalances in an infant. Hemodialysis can be started as soon as a diagnosis is made when it is combined with dietary feeds that maintain recommended calorie and amino acid intake.

=== Diet control ===
A diet with carefully controlled levels of the amino acids leucine, isoleucine, and valine must be maintained at all times to reduce toxic metabolites to prevent neurological damage. Since these three amino acids occur in all-natural protein, and most natural foods contain some protein, any food intake must be closely monitored, and day-to-day protein intake calculated on a cumulative basis, to ensure individual tolerance levels are not exceeded at any time. As the MSUD diet is so protein-restricted, and adequate protein is a requirement for all humans, a tailored metabolic formula containing all the other essential amino acids, as well as any vitamins, minerals, omega-3 fatty acids and trace elements (which may be lacking due to the limited range of permissible foods), are an essential aspect of MSUD management. These complement the MSUD patient's natural food intake to meet normal nutritional requirements without causing harm. If adequate calories cannot be obtained from natural food without exceeding protein tolerance, specialized low protein products such as starch-based baking mixtures, imitation rice and pasta may be prescribed, often alongside a protein-free carbohydrate powder added to food and/or drink, and increased at times of metabolic stress. MSUD patients with thiamine-responsive MSUD can have a higher protein intake diet with the administration of high doses of thiamine, a cofactor of the enzyme that causes the condition. The typical dosage amount of thiamine-responsive MSUD depends on the enzyme activity present and can range from 10 mg - 100 mg daily.

=== Acute Metabolic Decompensation ===
When Leucine plasma levels elevate due to not following the strict MSUD diets, infection, or physiological stress this may induce acute metabolic decompensation. Individuals with lower residual BCKAD activity have increased risk. Typically Leucine levels >380 mmol/L will lead to metabolic decompensation. The goal in treating acute decompensation is to stop protein breakdown and increase protein synthesis. When an individual is facing acute metabolic decompensation it is important to remove or correct the stressor that is causing physiologic decompensation. During decompensation, the individual must be still receiving the proper amount of calories, insulin, free amino acids, isoleucine, and valine to help promote protein synthesis.

=== Liver transplantation ===
Usually, MSUD patients are monitored by a dietitian. Liver transplantation is a treatment option that can completely and permanently normalize metabolic function, enabling discontinuation of nutritional supplements and strict monitoring of biochemistry and caloric intake, relaxation of MSUD-related lifestyle precautions, and an unrestricted diet. Liver transplantation may increase the BKD function by 10%, which is understood to be enough to prevent buildup of BCAA's that may lead to metabolic consequences. This procedure is most successful when performed at a young age, and weaning from immunosuppressants may even be possible in the long run. However, the surgery is a major undertaking requiring extensive hospitalization and rigorous adherence to a tapering regimen of medications. Following transplant, the risk of periodic rejection will always exist, as will the need for some degree of lifelong monitoring in this respect. Despite normalizing clinical presentation, liver transplantation is not considered a cure for MSUD. The patient will still carry two copies of the mutated BKAD gene in each of their cells, which will consequently still be unable to produce the missing enzyme. They will also still pass one mutated copy of the gene on to each of their biological children. As a major surgery, the transplant procedure itself also carries standard risks, although the odds of its success are greatly elevated when the only indication for it is an inborn error of metabolism. In the absence of a liver transplant, the MSUD diet must be adhered to strictly and permanently. However, in both treatment scenarios, with proper management, those affected can live healthy, normal lives without experiencing the severe neurological damage associated with the disease.

=== Pregnancy ===
Control of metabolism is vital during pregnancy of women with MSUD. To prevent detrimental abnormalities in the development of the embryo or fetus, dietary adjustments should be made and plasma amino acid concentrations of the mother should be observed carefully and frequently. Amino acid deficiency can be detected through fetal growth, making it essential to monitor development closely. BCAA levels should be monitored strictly with the goal of maintaining normal levels in individuals with MSUD who are pregnant.

Often times there was an increase in leucine levels about the target range through the whole course of the pregnancy. Pregnant individuals with MSUD can have healthy newborns which tells us that MSUD metabolites are unlikely to have teratogenic outcomes that lead to birth defects, developmental delays, or miscarriages.

== Prognosis ==
There are risks of long-term neurological effects from maple syrup urine disease. These may include ADHD, anxiety, depression, etc. The severity of these effects is dependent on the level of metabolic control. If left untreated, MSUD will lead to death due to central neurological function failure and respiratory failure. Early detection, protein-restricted diet low in branched-chain amino acids, close monitoring of blood chemistry, and aggressive treatment during a metabolic crisis can lead to a good prognosis with little or no abnormal developments. Early diagnosis can improve cognitive development, but the effects are largely dependent on the quality of healthcare systems and disease type. Cognitive development may be shown to be below that of the general population. The severity of the cognitive delay is related to the time the condition remained undiagnosed and the effectiveness of dietary control including during metabolic crises.

== Epidemiology ==
MSUD is a historically rare metabolic disorder with a worldwide incidence rate of about one in 185,000 live births. However, certain founder populations are much more prone to MSUD. For example, the Old Order Mennonites of Pennsylvania, produce as many as one in 200 live birth with MSUD.

Maple syrup urine disease is classified as an autosomal recessive disorder and has a higher prevalence in populations that have higher consanguinity. Infants who are not treated for early onset MSUD experience a significant delay in development and usually die within a few months of birth. Younger children with late-onset MSUD may experience developmental delay also, depending on the enzyme activity of BKCD (branched-chain alpha-keto acid dehydrogenase). In children with periods of increased protein catabolism, there is an increased risk for metabolic decompensation. Early diagnosis can prevent morbidity in most cases as long as correct treatment is administered at presentation and periods of possible metabolic decompensation. MSUD occurs in all ethnic groups and the sex of the infant/child does not play a role in prevalence.

NBS (newborn screening) programs incorporate MSUD screening in the United States, five provinces in Canada, Twenty-two European countries, eight Asian Pacific countries, and two Latin American countries.

== Research directions ==
=== Gene therapy ===
Gene therapy to overcome the genetic mutations that cause MSUD appears in preliminary trials to be safe in animal studies with MSUD. The gene therapy involves a healthy copy of the gene causing MSUD being produced and inserted into a viral vector. The adeno-associated virus vector is delivered one time to the patient intravenously. Hepatocytes will take up vector and functional copies of the affected gene in MSUD patients will be expressed. This will allow BCAA to be broken down properly and prevent toxic build-up.

=== Phenylbutyrate therapy ===
Sodium phenylacetate/benzoate or sodium phenylbutyrate has been shown to reduce BCAA in a clinical trial done February 2011. Phenylbutyrate treatment reduced the blood concentration of BCAA and their corresponding BCKA in certain groups of MSUD patients and may be a possible adjunctive treatment.

=== Metformin therapy ===
Metformin, a drug used for weight loss in diabetes patients, has been shown to reduce keto-isoaproic acid (KIC) in patient-derived fibroblasts as well as a murine model of MSUD. Metformin has also been shown to aid weight loss in MSUD patients who are at increased risk for obesity and related complications when following prescribed hyper-caloric diets to avoid metabolic decompensation.

=== Minocycline Therapy ===
Minocycline has been shown to reduce oxidative stress in a model of MSUD; results suggest that minocycline may have a neuro-protective role in MSUD.

=== Therapeutics for neurotoxicity ===
Exploring targeted therapeutics for the various states contributing to neurotoxicity may play a role in treating individuals with MSUD.

== See also ==
- Combined malonic and methylmalonic aciduria (CMAMMA)
- Isovaleric acidemia
- Methylmalonic acidemia
- Propionic acidemia
