= Branched-chain alpha-keto acid dehydrogenase complex =

Multienzyme complex

The branched-chain α-ketoacid dehydrogenase complex (BCKDC or BCKDH complex) is a multi-subunit complex of enzymes that is found on the mitochondrial inner membrane. This enzyme complex catalyzes the oxidative decarboxylation of branched, short-chain alpha-ketoacids. BCKDC is a member of the mitochondrial α-ketoacid dehydrogenase complex family, which also includes the pyruvate dehydrogenase complex (PDHC) and alpha-ketoglutarate dehydrogenase complex (OGDC), key enzymes that function in the Krebs cycle, as well as the 2-oxoadipate dehydrogenase complex (OADHC), which plays a critical role in the degradation of the amino acids lysine, hydroxylysine, and tryptophan.

== Biological function ==
In animal tissue, BCKDC catalyzes an irreversible step in the catabolism of the branched-chain amino acids L-isoleucine, L-valine, and L-leucine, acting on their deaminated derivatives (L-alpha-keto-beta-methylvalerate, alpha-ketoisovalerate, and alpha-ketoisocaproate, respectively) and converting them to α-Methylbutyryl-CoA, Isobutyryl-CoA and Isovaleryl-CoA respectively. In bacteria, this enzyme participates in the synthesis of branched, long-chain fatty acids. In plants, this enzyme is involved in the synthesis of branched, long-chain hydrocarbons.

The overall catabolic reaction catalyzed by the BCKDC is shown in Figure 1.

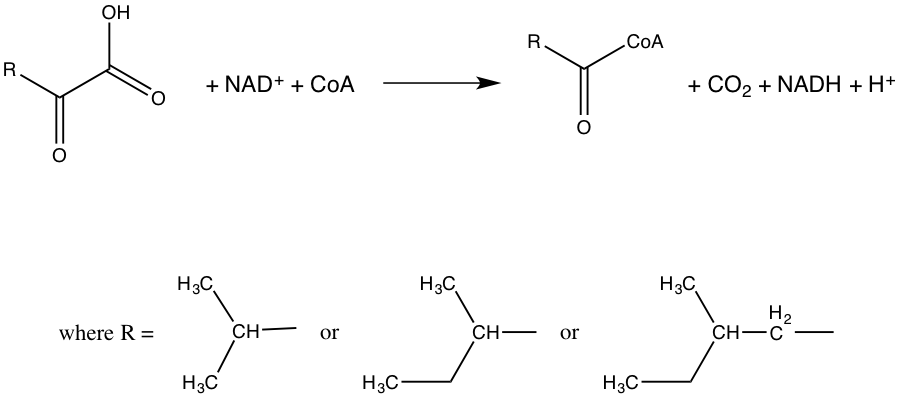
Figure 1: This is the overall reaction catalyzed by the branched-chain alpha-ketoacid dehydrogenase complex.

== Structure ==
The mechanism of enzymatic catalysis by the BCKDC draws largely upon the elaborate structure of this large enzyme complex. This enzyme complex is composed of three catalytic components:

Unit	EC number	Name	Gene	Cofactor
E_{1}	EC 1.2.4.4	alpha-ketoacid dehydrogenase	BCKDHA, BCKDHB	thiamine pyrophosphate (TPP)
E_{2}	EC 2.3.1.168	dihydrolipoyl transacylase	DBT	lipoic acid, coenzyme A
E_{3}	EC 1.8.1.4	dihydrolipoamide dehydrogenase	DLD	FAD, NAD

In humans, 24 copies of E_{2} arranged in octahedral symmetry form the core of the BCKDC. Non-covalently linked to this polymer of 24 E_{2} subunits are 12 E_{1} α2β2 tetramers and 6 E_{3} homodimers. In addition to the E_{1}/E_{3}-binding domain, there are 2 other important structural domains in the E_{2} subunit: (i) a lipoyl-bearing domain in the amino-terminal portion of the protein and (ii) an inner-core domain in the carboxy-terminal portion. The inner-core domain is linked to the other two domains of the E_{2} subunit by two interdomain segments (linkers). The inner-core domain is necessary to form the oligomeric core of the enzyme complex and catalyzes the acyltransferase reaction (shown in the "Mechanism" section below). The lipoyl domain of E_{2} is free to swing between the active sites of the E_{1}, E_{2}, and E_{3} subunits on the assembled BCKDC by virtue of the conformational flexibility of the aforementioned linkers (see Figure 2). Thus, in terms of function as well as structure, the E_{2} component plays a central role in the overall reaction catalyzed by the BCKDC.

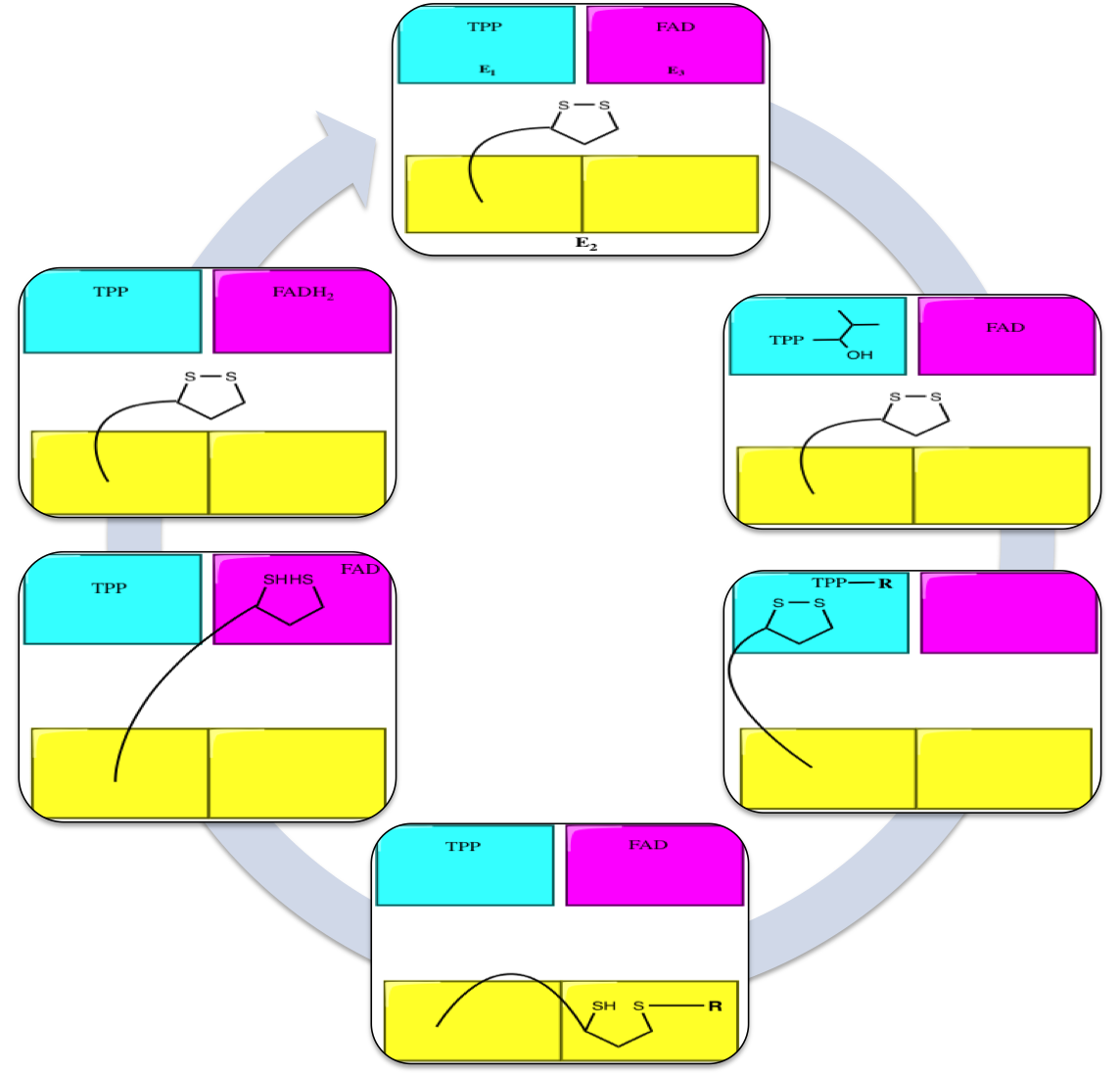
Figure 2:This is a schematic of the "swinging" lipoyl domain. Note that this lipoyl domain is covalently attached to the E_{2} subunit of the BCKDC, but is free to swing between the E_{1}, E_{2}, and E_{3} subunits. As is described in the "Mechanism" section, the ability of the lipoyl group to freely swing between the active sites on each of the three subunits of the BCKDC plays a large and important role in the catalytic activity of this enzyme complex.

The role of each subunit is as follows:

=== E_{1} subunit ===
E_{1} uses thiamine pyrophosphate (TPP) as a catalytic cofactor. E_{1} catalyzes both the decarboxylation of the α-ketoacid and the subsequent reductive acylation of the lipoyl moiety (another catalytic cofactor) that is covalently bound to E_{2}.

=== E_{2} subunit ===
E_{2} catalyzes a transfer of the acyl group from the lipoyl moiety to coenzyme A (a stoichiometric cofactor).

=== E_{3} subunit ===
The E_{3} component is a flavoprotein, and it re-oxidizes the reduced lipoyl sulfur residues of E_{2} using FAD (a catalytic cofactor) as the oxidant. FAD then transfers these protons and electrons to NAD+ (a stoichiometric cofactor) to complete the reaction cycle.

== Mechanism ==
As previously mentioned, BCKDC's primary function in mammals is to catalyze an irreversible step in the catabolism of branched-chain amino acids. However BCKDC has a relatively broad specificity, also oxidizing 4-methylthio-2-oxobutyrate and 2-oxobutyrate at comparable rates and with similar Km values as for its branched-chain amino acid substrates. The BCKDC will also oxidize pyruvate, but at such a slow rate this side reaction has very little physiological significance.

The reaction mechanism is as follows. Please note that any of several branched-chain α-ketoacids could have been used as a starting material; for this example, α-ketoisovalerate was arbitrarily chosen as the BCKDC substrate.

NOTE: Steps 1 and 2 occur in the E_{1} domain

STEP 1: α-ketoisovalerate combines with TPP and is then decarboxylated. The proper arrow-pushing mechanism is shown in Figure 3.

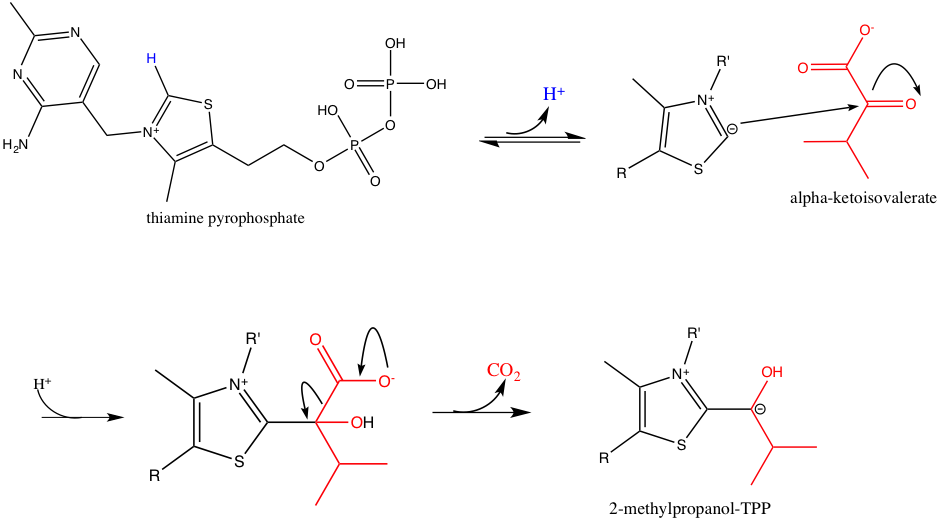
Figure 3: α-ketoisovalerate combines with TPP and is then decarboxylated

STEP 2: The 2-methylpropanol-TPP is oxidized to form an acyl group while being simultaneously transferred to the lipoyl cofactor on E2. Note that TPP is regenerated. The proper arrow-pushing mechanism is shown in Figure 4.

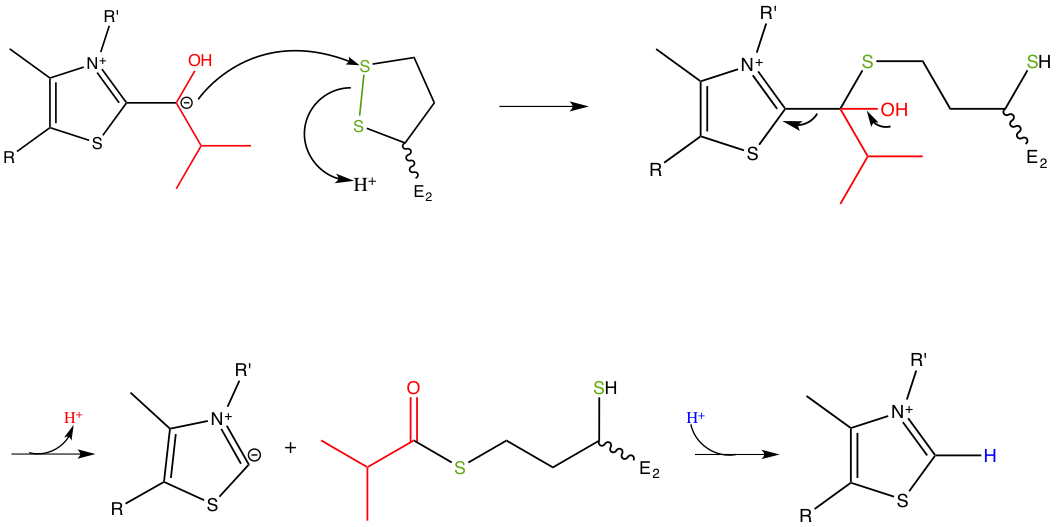
Figure 4: The 2-methylpropanol-TPP is oxidized to form an acyl group while being simultaneously transferred to the lipoyl cofactor on E2. Note that TPP is regenerated.

NOTE: The acylated lipoyl arm now leaves E_{1} and swings into the E_{2} active site, where Step 3 occurs.

STEP 3: Acyl group transfer to CoA. The proper arrow-pushing mechanism is shown in Figure 5.

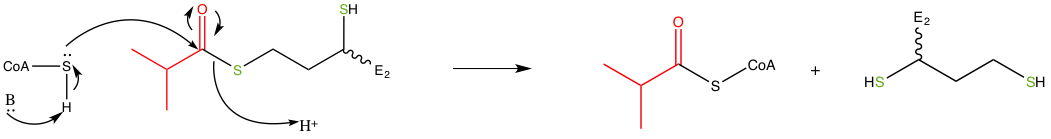
Figure 5: Acyl group transfer to CoA

*NOTE: The reduced lipoyl arm now swings into the E_{3} active site, where Steps 4 and 5 occur.

STEP 4: Oxidation of the lipoyl moiety by the FAD coenzyme, as shown in Figure 6.

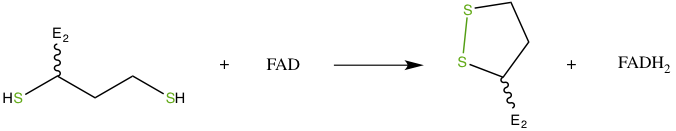
Figure 6: Oxidation of the lipoyl moiety by the FAD coenzyme.

STEP 5: Reoxidation of FADH_{2} to FAD, producing NADH:

FADH_{2} + NAD^{+} → FAD + NADH + H^{+}

== Disease relevance ==
A deficiency in any of the enzymes of this complex as well as an inhibition of the complex as a whole leads to a buildup of branched-chain amino acids and their harmful derivatives in the body. These accumulations lend a sweet smell to bodily excretions (such as ear wax and urine), leading to a pathology known as maple syrup urine disease.

This enzyme is an autoantigen recognized in primary biliary cirrhosis, a form of acute liver failure. These antibodies appear to recognize oxidized protein that has resulted from inflammatory immune responses. Some of these inflammatory responses are explained by gluten sensitivity. Other mitochondrial autoantigens include pyruvate dehydrogenase and branched-chain oxoglutarate dehydrogenase, which are antigens recognized by anti-mitochondrial antibodies.

Mutations of the BCKDK gene, whose protein product controls the activity of the complex, may result in over-activation of the complex and excessive catabolism of the three amino acids. This leads to branched-chain keto acid dehydrogenase kinase deficiency, a rare disease first described in humans in 2012.
