= Phenylalanine dehydrogenase =

phenylalanine dehydrogenase

Identifiers
- EC no.: 1.4.1.20
- CAS no.: 69403-12-9

Databases
- IntEnz: IntEnz view
- BRENDA: BRENDA entry
- ExPASy: NiceZyme view
- KEGG: KEGG entry
- MetaCyc: metabolic pathway
- PRIAM: profile
- PDB structures: RCSB PDB PDBe PDBsum
- Gene Ontology: AmiGO / QuickGO
Search
- PMC: articles
- PubMed: articles
- NCBI: proteins

In enzymology, phenylalanine dehydrogenase (EC 1.4.1.20) is an enzyme that catalyzes the chemical reaction

phenylalanine
+ NAD^{+}
H_{2}O
H^{+}
H_{2}O
H^{+}
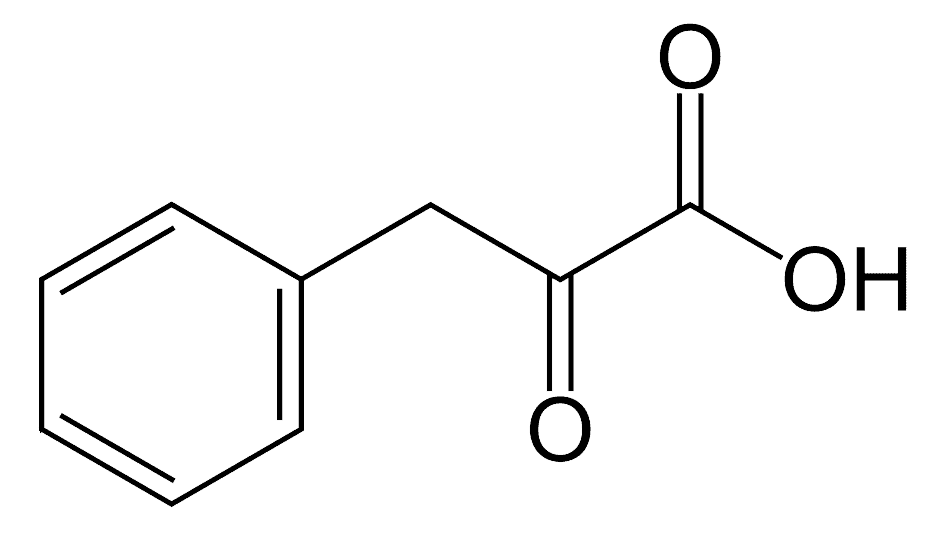
phenylpyruvic acid
+ NADP + NH_{3}

The three substrates of this enzyme are L-phenylalanine, water, and oxidised nicotinamide adenine dinucleotide (NAD^{+}). Its products are phenylpyruvic acid, ammonia, reduced NADH, and a proton.

This enzyme belongs to the family of oxidoreductases, specifically those acting on the CH-NH_{2} group of donors with NAD^{+} or NADP^{+} as acceptor. The systematic name of this enzyme class is L-phenylalanine:NAD^{+} oxidoreductase (deaminating). Other names in common use include L-phenylalanine dehydrogenase, and PHD. This enzyme participates in phenylalanine metabolism and phenylalanine, tyrosine and tryptophan biosynthesis.

== Structural studies ==
As of late 2007, two structures have been solved for this class of enzymes, with PDB accession codes 1BW9 and 1BXG.
