= Branched-chain keto acid dehydrogenase kinase deficiency =

Autosomal recessive metabolic disorder

BCKDK (Branched Chain Ketoacid Dehydrogenase Kinase) deficit disease
- Leucine (pictured above), Isoleucine, and valine are the branched-chain amino acids used to treat BCKDK deficit
- Specialty: Medical genetics

Branched-chain keto acid dehydrogenase kinase deficiency (BCKDK deficiency) is a disease resulting from mutations of the BCKDK gene. Patients with BCKDK deficiency have low levels of branched chain amino acids (BCAA) in their organism due to accelerated breakdown of these essential amino acids. This results in delayed brain development, which may present as intellectual disability and autism spectrum disorder. Patients may suffer from epileptic seizure.

== Signs and symptoms ==
BCKDK deficit disease symptoms may include autism, intellectual disability and developmental delay. R.Constante, Juliana et al. reported a list of symptoms in a study of 20 cases. Those symptoms included: neurodevelopmental delay, gross motor function impairment, intellectual disability, language impairment, epilepsy and clumsiness, and also microcephaly, non present at birth.

== Treatment ==
Continuous replenishment of BCAA levels has been reported to alleviate the symptoms in patients, combined with a high protein diet. Ongoing studies, not yet published, may indicate a greater improvement if the supplementation is administrated every 3 hours. When treatment was applied, (supplementation of 100–260 mg/kg/day and high protein diet), all patients improved in motor functions, and half the patients reached normocephaly. None of the patients that started treatment before 2 years old developed autism, and the patient who started treatment earlier (8 months) experienced almost normal development at 3 years old.

== Prevalence ==
According to Garcia-Cazorla (2020), there are currently 21 documented cases worldwide R.Constante, Juliana et al. reported a list of symptoms in a study of 20 cases. It was communicated in the 14th European Paediatric Neurology Society Congress . Those symptoms included: neurodevelopmental delay, gross motor function impairment, intellectual disability, language impairment, epilepsy and clumsiness, and also microcephaly, non present at birth.

== History ==
The disease was first described in 2012 in three unrelated families.

Later on, García-Cazorla, Oyarzabal et al. confirmed that BCKDK mutations can result in neurobehavioral deficits in humans and support the rationale for dietary intervention. In their 2013 study, they found out BCAA (leucine, isoleucine, and valine) supplementation every 5 hours plus a high protein diet showed significant improvement for BCKDK deficit disease patients.
