= Branched-chain amino acid aminotransferase =

Type of aminotransferase enzyme

Branched-chain-amino-acid transaminase
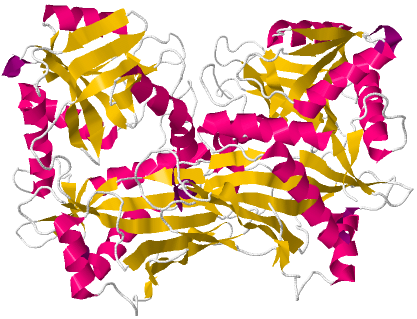
- Crystallographic structure of branched-chain-amino-acid aminotransferase from Mycobacterium smegmatis

Identifiers
- EC no.: 2.6.1.42

Databases
- BRENDA: enzyme data
- ExPASy: NiceZyme view
- KEGG: enzyme entry
- MetaCyc: metabolic pathway
- Rhea: reactions
- PDB structures: RCSB PDB PDBe PDBsum
Search
- PMC: articles
- PubMed: articles
- NCBI: proteins

Branched-chain amino acid aminotransferases (BCAT), also known as branched-chain amino acid transaminases, are a type of aminotransferase enzyme (EC 2.6.1.42) that act upon branched-chain amino acids (BCAAs). In humans, the two forms are encoded by the genes BCAT1 (cytosolic) and BCAT2 (mitochondrial). BCAT enzymes catalyze the conversion of BCAAs and α-ketoglutarate into branched chain α-keto acids and glutamate.

The structure to the right of branched chain amino acid aminotransferase was found using X-ray diffraction with a resolution of 2.20 Å. The branched-chain amino acid aminotransferase found in this image was isolated from mycobacteria. This protein is made up of two identical polypeptide chains, totaling 372 residues.

The biological function of branched-chain amino acid aminotransferases is to catalyse the synthesis or degradation of the branched chain amino acids leucine, isoleucine, and valine. In humans, branched chain amino acids are essential and are degraded by BCATs.

== Structure and function ==
In humans, BCATs are homodimers composed of two domains, a small subunit (residues 1-170) and a large subunit (residues 182-365). These subunits are connected by a short, looping connecting region (residues 171-181). Both subunits consist of four alpha-helices and a beta-pleated sheet. Structural studies of human branched-chain amino acid aminotransferases (hBCAT) revealed that the peptide bonds in both isoforms are all trans except for the bond between residues Gly338-Pro339. The active site of the enzyme lies in the interface between the two domains. Like other transaminase enzymes (as well as many enzymes of other classes), BCATs require the cofactor pyridoxal-5'-phosphate (PLP) for activity. PLP has been found to change the conformation of aminotransferase enzymes, locking the conformation of the enzyme via a Schiff base (imine) linkage in a reaction between a lysine residue of the enzyme and the carbonyl group of the cofactor. This conformational change allows the substrates to bind to the active site pocket of the enzymes.

=== Active site ===
In addition to the Schiff base linkage, PLP is anchored to the active site of the enzyme via hydrogen bonding at the Tyr 207 and Glu237 residues. In addition, the phosphate oxygen atoms on the PLP molecule interact with the Arg99, Val269, Val270, and Thr310 residues. Mammalian BCATs show a unique structural CXXC motif (Cys315 and Cys318) sensitive to oxidizing agents and modulated through S-nitrosation, a post-translational modification that regulates cell signaling. Modification of these two cysteine residues via oxidation (in vivo/vitro) or titration (in vitro) has been found to inhibit enzyme activity, indicating that the CXXC motif is crucial to optimal protein folding and function. The sensitivity of both isoenzymes to oxidation make them potential biomarkers for the redox environment within the cell. Although the CXXC motif is present only in mammalian BCATs, the surrounding amino acid residues were found to be highly conserved in both prokaryotic and eukaryotic cells. Conway, Yeenawar et al. found that the mammalian active site contains three surfaces: surface A (Phe75, Tyr207 and Thr240), surface B (Phe30, Tyr141, and Ala314), and surface C (Tyr70, Leu153 and Val155, located on the opposite domain) that bind to the substrate in a Van der Waals-type interaction with the branched side chains of the amino acid substrates.

== Isoforms ==
=== Mammalian ===
BCATs in mammals catalyze the first step in branched-chain amino acid metabolism, a reversible transamination followed by the oxidative decarboxylation of the transamination products α-ketoisocaproate, α-keto-β-methylvalerate, and α-ketoisovalerate to isovaleryl-CoA, 3-methylbutyryl-CoA, and isobutyryl-CoA, respectively. This reaction regulates metabolism of amino acids and is a crucial step in nitrogen shuttling throughout the whole body. Branched-chain amino acids (BCAA) are ubiquitous in many organisms, comprising 35% of all proteins and 40% of the amino acids required in all mammals. Mammalian BCATs come in two isoforms: cytosolic (BCATc) and mitochondrial (BCATm). The isoforms share 58% homology, but vary in location and catalytic efficiency.

==== Bcatc ====
Cytosolic branched-chain amino acid aminotransferases are the less common of the two isoforms, found in the cytoplasm of mammalian cells almost exclusively throughout the nervous system. Although BCATc are expressed only in a few adult tissues, they are expressed at a high level during embryogenesis. The cytosolic isoform has a higher turnover rate, approximately 2-5 times faster than the mitochondrial isoform. BCATc has been found to be more stable than BCATm, with evidence suggesting 2 sulfide bonds. The cytosolic isozyme demonstrates no loss in activity upon titration of one thiol group hBCATc demonstrates a lower redox potential (approximately 30 mV) than hBCATm. Human BCATc is encoded by BCAT1

==== Bcatm ====
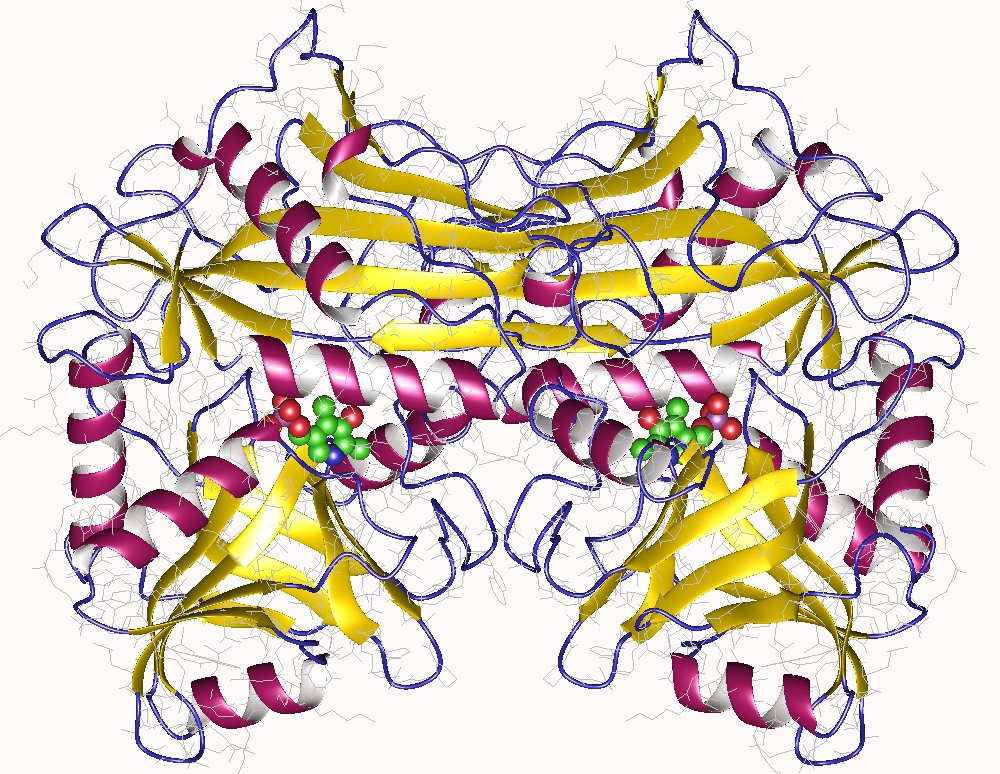
Branched-chain amino acid aminotransferase, mitochondrial, homodimer, Human

Mitochondrial branched-chain amino acid aminotransferases are the more ubiquitous of the two isoforms, present in all tissues in the mitochondria of the cell. Pancreatic acinar tissue has been found to carry the highest levels of BCATm in the body In addition, two homologs to normal BCATm have been found. One homolog is found in placental tissue, and the other co-represses thyroid hormone nuclear receptors. BCATm is more sensitive to the redox environment of the cell, and can be inhibited by nickel ions even if the environment is reducing. BCATm has been found to form no disulfide bonds, and titration of two -SH groups with 5,5'- dithiobis(2-nitrobenzoic acid) eliminates enzyme activity completely in the case of the BCATm isozyme. In humans, BCATm is encoded by the BCAT2 gene.

=== Plant isoforms ===
Plant BCATs have also been identified, but vary between species in terms of number and sequence. In studies of Arabidopsis thaliana (thale cress), six BCAT isoforms have been identified that share between 47.5-84.1% homology with each other. These isoforms also share around 30% sequence homology to the human and yeast (Saccharomyces cerevisiae) isoforms. BCAT1 is located in the mitochondria, BCAT2, 3, and 5 are located in chloroplasts, and BCAT4 and 6 are located in the cytoplasm of A. thaliana. However, studies of BCATs in Solanum tuberosum (potato) revealed two isoforms that are 683 (BCAT1) and 746 (BCAT2) bp long located primarily in chloroplasts.

=== Bacterial isoforms ===
In bacteria, there is only one isoform of the BCAT enzyme. However, the structure of the enzyme is different between organisms. In Escherichia coli, the enzyme is a hexamer containing six identical subunits. Each subunit has a molecular weight of 34 kDa and is composed of 308 amino acids. In contrast, Lactococcus lactis BCAT is a homodimer similar to the mammalian isoforms. Each subunit of the L. lactis BCAT is composed of 340 amino acids for a molecular weight of 38 kDa.

== Physiological roles ==
=== Humans ===
Because branched chain amino acids are crucial in the formation and function of many proteins, BCATs have many responsibilities in mammalian physiology. BCATs have been found to interact with protein disulfide isomerases, a class of enzymes that regulate cellular repair and proper protein folding. The second step of branched chain amino acid metabolism (oxidative carboxylation by branched chain ketoacid dehydrogenase) stimulates insulin secretion. Loss of BCATm correlates with a loss in BCKD-stimulated insulin secretion, but has not been associated with losses in insulin secretion from other metabolic pathways. BCATc regulates the mTORC1 signaling and TCR-induced glycolytic metabolism pathways during CD4^{+} T cell activation. In the brain, BCATc regulates the amount of glutamate production for use as a neurotransmitter or for future γ-Aminobutyric acid (GABA) synthesis.

=== Plants ===
BCATs also play a role in the physiology of plant species, but it has not been studied as extensively as mammalian BCATs. In Cucumis melo (melon), BCATs have been found to play a role in developing aroma volatile compounds that give melons their distinct scent and flavor. In Solanum lycopersicum (tomatoes), BCATs play a role in synthesizing the branched-chain amino acids that act as electron donors in the electron transport chain. Overall, plant BCATs have catabolic and anabolic regulatory functions.

=== Bacteria ===
In bacterial physiology, BCATs perform both reactions, forming both α-ketoacids and branched chain amino acids. Bacteria growing on a medium lacking the right amino acid ratios for growth must be able to synthesize branched chain amino acids in order to proliferate. In Streptococcus mutans, the gram-positive bacteria that lives in human oral cavities and is responsible for tooth decay, amino acid biosynthesis/degradation has been found to regulate glycolysis and maintain the internal pH of the cell. This allows the bacteria to survive in the acidic conditions of the human oral cavity from the breakdown of carbohydrates.

== Uses ==
=== Synthetic organic chemistry ===
BCATs have been used in the synthesis of some pharmaceutical drugs as an alternative to heavy metal catalysts, which can be expensive/environmentally unfriendly. Aminotransferases (transaminases) in general have been used to create unnatural amino acids, important building blocks for peptidomimetic drugs and agricultural products. BCAT from E. coli is typically engineered to be overexpressed and extracted from whole cells to be used for chemical synthesis. Aminotransferases are used because they can accomplish a typically multi-step reaction in one step, can perform reactions on a wide range of substrates, and have high regioselectivity and enantioselectivity. In synthetic organic chemistry, BCATs are typically used for the conversion of L-Leucine to 2-ketoglutarate.

=== Drug target ===
The anticonvulsant gabapentin [Neurontin; 1-(aminomethyl)cyclohexaneacetic acid] is a drug often used to treat patients with neuropathic pain. This neuropathic pain can be caused by a number of things, including diabetic neuropathy and postherpetic neuralgia. Gabapentin is an amino acid drug structurally similar to the two neurotransmitters glutamate (synthesized by BCATs) and GABA. The drug competitively inhibits both BCAT isoforms in the brain, slowing down glutamate production. Gabapentin also inhibits GABA aminotransferase (GABA-T) and glutamate dehydrogenase (GDH), two other enzymes in the glutamate and GABA metabolic pathway.

=== Cured meat and cheese industries ===
The bacteria L. lactis is the primary bacteria responsible for the ripening of cheeses, and the enzymes within the bacteria play key roles in the development of flavor, texture, and aroma profiles. The branched-chain amino acid aminotransferases help to produce compounds like isovaleric acid, isobutyric acid, 2- and 3-methylbutan(al)(ol) and 2-methylpropan(al)(ol) that impart fruity or malty aromas depending on the amount of compound present. Along with the aromatic aminotransferases (AraT), BCATs in L. lactis help develop the aroma/flavor resulting from volatile sulphur compounds produced during fermentation.

The bacteria Staphylococcus carnosus and Enterococcus faecalis are often used in tandem with other lactic acid bacterium to begin the meat fermentation process. BCATs in these two bacteria perform transaminations during meat fermentation, producing the corresponding α-ketoacids from amino acids. As fermentation proceeds, these α-ketoacids degrade into a class of compounds known as methyl-branched volatiles that include aldehydes, alcohols, and carboxylic acids, all of which contribute to the distinct scents and flavors of cured meats.

== Ideal conditions ==
A study of BCAT from Lactococcus lactis by Yvon, Chambellon et al., found the ideal conditions for the bacterial isozyme as follows:

- pH: ~7.5
- Temperature: ~35-40 °C (storage at 6 °C keeps enzyme stable for ~1 week)
- Absence of carbonyl, sulfhydryl, or Cu^{2+} or Co^{2+} reagents/compounds
- Enzyme catalyzes reaction best with branched chain amino acids (in order from most activity to least: isoleucine, leucine, valine)
- Enzyme also shows minimal activity with methionine, cysteine, and alanine.
