= Branched-chain amino acid =

Amino acid with a branched carbon chain

Chemical structures of BCAAs

Leucine

Isoleucine

Valine

A branched-chain amino acid (BCAA) is an amino acid having an aliphatic side-chain with a branch (a central carbon atom bound to three or more carbon atoms). Among the proteinogenic amino acids, there are three BCAAs: leucine, isoleucine, and valine. Non-proteinogenic BCAAs include 2-aminoisobutyric acid and alloisoleucine.

The three proteinogenic BCAAs are among the nine essential amino acids for humans, accounting for 35% of the essential amino acids in muscle proteins and 40% of the preformed amino acids required by mammals. Synthesis for BCAAs occurs in all locations of plants, within the plastids of the cell, as determined by presence of mRNAs which encode for enzymes in the metabolic pathway. Oxidation of BCAAs may increase fatty acid oxidation and play a role in obesity. Physiologically, BCAAs take on roles in the immune system and in brain function. BCAAs are broken down effectively by dehydrogenase and decarboxylase enzymes expressed by immune cells, and are required for lymphocyte growth and proliferation and cytotoxic T lymphocyte activity. Lastly, BCAAs share the same transport protein into the brain with aromatic amino acids (Trp, Tyr, and Phe). Once in the brain BCAAs may have a role in protein synthesis, synthesis of neurotransmitters, and production of energy.

== Dietary requirements ==
The Food and Nutrition Board (FNB) of the U.S. Institute of Medicine set Recommended Dietary Allowances (RDAs) for essential amino acids in 2002. For leucine, for adults 19 years and older, 42 mg/kg body weight/day; for isoleucine 19 mg/kg body weight/day; for valine 24 mg/kg body weight/day. For a 70 kg (154 lb) person this equates to 2.9, 1.3 and 1.7 g/day. Diets that meet or exceed the RDA for total protein (0.8 g/kg/day; 56 grams for a 70 kg person), meet or exceed the RDAs for branched-chain amino acids.

== Biosynthesis ==
Five enzymes participate in the parallel synthesis pathways for isoleucine, valine, and leucine: threonine dehydrogenase, acetohydroxyacid synthase, ketol-acid reductoisomerase, dihydroxyacid dehydrogenase and aminotransferase. Threonine dehydrogenase catalyzes the deamination and dehydration of threonine to 2-ketobutyrate and ammonia. Isoleucine forms a negative feedback loop with threonine dehydrogenase. Acetohydroxyacid synthase is the first enzyme for the parallel pathway performing condensation reaction in both steps – condensation of pyruvate to acetolactate in the valine pathway and condensation of pyruvate and 2-ketobutyrate to form acetohydroxybutyrate in the isoleucine pathway. Next ketoacid reductoisomerase reduces the acetohydroxy acids from the previous step to yield dihydroxyacids in both the valine and isoleucine pathways. Dihydroxyacid dehydrogenase converts the dihyroxyacids in the next step. The final step in the parallel pathway is conducted by amino transferase, which yields the final products of valine and isoleucine. A series of four more enzymes – 2-isopropylmalate synthase, isopropylmalate isomerase, isopropylmalate dehydrogenase, and aminotransferase – are necessary for the formation of leucine from 2-oxolsovalerate.

== Metabolism ==
The degradation of leucine, isoleucine, and valine. The methionine degradation pathway is also pictured.

Unlike most amino acids, which are primarily oxidized in the liver, BCAAs are predominantly metabolized in skeletal muscle and other peripheral tissues.

Degradation of branched-chain amino acids involves the branched-chain alpha-keto acid dehydrogenase complex (BCKDH). A deficiency of this complex leads to a buildup of the branched-chain amino acids (leucine, isoleucine, and valine) and their toxic by-products in the blood and urine, giving the condition the name maple syrup urine disease. On the other hand, unchecked activity of this complex causes branched-chain keto acid dehydrogenase kinase deficiency.

The BCKDH complex converts branched-chain amino acids into acyl-CoA derivatives, which after subsequent reactions are converted either into acetyl-CoA or succinyl-CoA that enter the citric acid cycle.

Enzymes involved are branched chain aminotransferase and 3-methyl-2-oxobutanoate dehydrogenase.

== Regulation of muscle protein synthesis ==
Early experiments on rat diaphragm muscle demonstrated that a mixture of BCAAs alone stimulated muscle growth to a similar extent as a complete amino acid mixture. By contrast, an amino acid mixture lacking BCAAs had no effect on muscle growth. Among the three BCAAs, administration of leucine alone produced nearly the same effect as the full BCAA mixture, whereas isoleucine or valine alone had little impact.

Leucine promotes protein synthesis through indirect activation of p70 S6 kinase and stimulation of assembly of the eIF4F complex, both of which are essential for initiation of mRNA translation. P70 S6 kinase is a downstream component of the mammalian target of rapamycin complex (mTOR) pathway, which regulates adaptive hypertrophy and recovery in skeletal muscle.

At rest, infusion of protein stimulates muscle protein synthesis within 30 minutes, with elevated rates persisting for approximately 90 minutes. Leucine infusion at rest produces a prolonged stimulatory effect, maintaining increased protein synthesis for up to six hours through phosphorylation of p70 S6 kinase in skeletal muscle.

Following resistance exercise without BCAA administration, phosphorylation of mTOR is not significantly increased, and phosphorylation of Akt may even decline, although some activation of p70 S6 kinase is observed. In contrast, post-exercise BCAA supplementation induces robust phosphorylation of p70 S6 kinase and its downstream target S6, consistent with activation of the mTOR signaling cascade.

== Effects of supplementation on exercise ==
BCAAs have an insulin-like effect on glucose, lowering circulating glucose concentrations. When ingested before exercise, they can be oxidized by skeletal muscle and used as an energy source, reducing the need for the liver to increase glycogenolysis.

During anaerobic exercise, pyruvate derived from glucose metabolism is converted into lactic acid. The accumulation of lactic acid can lower pH to as low as 6.4, contributing to metabolic acidosis. Elevated lactic acid levels inhibit glucose metabolism to prevent further acidification. BCAA supplementation has been reported to decrease lactic acid concentrations in muscle, thereby allowing glucose metabolism to continue during exercise. This effect reduces glycogenolysis in the liver and lowers plasma glucose during exercise, although long-term supplementation appears to have little effect on blood glucose outside of exercise.

BCAAs also influence central fatigue mechanisms. They reduce circulating free fatty acids (FFA), which compete with tryptophan for binding to albumin. Lower FFA levels increase albumin-bound tryptophan, thereby decreasing free tryptophan entry into the brain. Since free tryptophan is a precursor to serotonin (5-HT), reduced tryptophan uptake lowers serotonin synthesis during exercise, diminishing the sensation of fatigue. In rats, BCAA supplementation reduced brain serotonin by up to 90%, though such reductions can also impair focus, impulse control, and executive function. BCAAs also inhibit uptake of tyrosine, a precursor of catecholamines such as dopamine and norepinephrine, potentially depressing catecholamine synthesis. Because both serotonin and catecholamines influence exercise capacity, their simultaneous reduction may explain the relatively neutral net effect of BCAA supplementation on performance.

BCAA supplementation also alters nitrogen metabolism. During exercise, serum ammonia levels increase, contributing to both muscular and central fatigue. In muscle, high ammonia enhances phosphofructokinase (PFK) activity, further increasing lactic acid production. BCAAs enhance glutamine synthesis, which consumes ammonia and limits its accumulation. Excess ammonia in the brain reduces levels of GABA and glutamate, promoting central fatigue.

Finally, BCAA supplementation has been associated with reduced levels of creatine kinase in muscle following exercise, an indicator of reduced muscle damage. Creatine kinase transfers phosphate groups from ATP to form phosphocreatine, which buffers cellular energy supply. Meta-analyses suggest BCAA supplementation may lower creatine kinase levels and attenuate DOMS.

== Role in type 2 diabetes ==
In addition to cell signaling, the mTOR pathway also plays a role in beta cell growth leading to insulin secretion. High glucose in the blood begins the process of the mTOR signaling pathway, in which leucine plays an indirect role. The combination of glucose, leucine, and other activators cause mTOR to start signaling for the proliferation of beta cells and the secretion of insulin. Higher concentrations of leucine cause hyperactivity in the mTOR pathway, and S6 kinase is activated leading to inhibition of insulin receptor substrate through serine phosphorylation. In the cell the increased activity of mTOR complex causes eventual inability of beta cells to release insulin and the inhibitory effect of S6 kinase leads to insulin resistance in the cells, contributing to development of type 2 diabetes.

Metformin is able to activate AMP kinase which phosphorylates proteins involved in the mTOR pathway, as well as leads to the progression of mTOR complex from its inactive state to its active state. It is suggested that metformin acts as a competitive inhibitor to the amino acid leucine in the mTOR pathway.

== Treatment ==
Maapliv
Combination of
- L-alanine: Amino acid
- L-arginine: Amino acid
- L-aspartic acid: Amino acid
- L-cysteine hydrochloride: Amino acid
- L-glutamic acid: Amino acid
- Glycine: Amino acid

Clinical data
- Trade names: Maapliv

Legal status
- Legal status: EU: Rx-only

Maapliv is a medication used to treat an acute decompensation episode (sudden worsening) of maple syrup urine disease. Maple syrup urine disease is an inherited disorder in which the body is unable to break down certain building blocks of protein known as branched-chain amino acids, including leucine, isoleucine and valine. As a result, these amino acids build up in the body, including in the brain, where leucine in particular can lead to brain damage. Maapliv is for use in people who cannot receive BCAA-free amino acids by mouth or via a feeding tube.

Maapliv contains the amino acids L-alanine, L-arginine, L-aspartic acid, L-cysteine hydrochloride monodhydrate, L-glutamic acid, glycine, L-histidine, L-lysine, L-methionine, L-phenylalanine, L-proline, L-serine, taurine, L-threonine, L-tryptophan, and L-tyrosine.

Maapliv is indicated for the treatment of maple syrup urine disease presenting with an acute decompensation episode in people from birth who are not eligible for an oral and enteral branched- chain amino acids free (BCAA- free) formulation.

Maapliv was authorized for medical use in the European Union in July 2025.

== Research ==
Dietary BCAAs have been used in an attempt to treat some cases of hepatic encephalopathy. They can have the effect of alleviating symptoms of hepatic encephalopathy, but there is no evidence they benefit mortality rates, nutrition, or overall quality of life as further research is necessary.

Certain studies suggested a possible link between a high incidence of amyotrophic lateral sclerosis (ALS) among professional American football players and Italian soccer players, and certain sports supplements including BCAAs. In mouse studies, BCAAs were shown to cause cell hyper-excitability resembling that usually observed in ALS patients. The proposed underlying mechanism is that cell hyper-excitability results in increased calcium absorption by the cell and thus brings about cell death, specifically of neuronal cells which have particularly low calcium buffering capabilities. Yet any link between BCAAs and ALS remains to be fully established. While BCAAs can induce a hyperexcitability similar to the one observed in mice with ALS, current work does not show if a BCAA-enriched diet, given over a prolonged period, actually induces ALS-like symptoms.

Blood levels of the BCAAs are elevated in obese, insulin resistant humans and in mouse and rat models of diet-induced diabetes, suggesting the possibility that BCAAs contribute to the pathogenesis of obesity and diabetes. BCAA-restricted diets improve glucose tolerance and promote leanness in normal weight mice, restores insulin sensitivity and normal body weight to obese mice and promotes insulin sensitivity in obese rats. In lean and obese mice, these benefits of BCAA-restriction are mediated by isoleucine and valine, and not by restriction of leucine.

Restriction of dietary BCAAs extends lifespan in flies, while restriction of BCAAs in mice extends male lifespan and decreased frailty, but does not extend female lifespan. In mice, dietary supplementation with BCAAs alone decreases lifespan and promotes obesity. However, consumption of a BCAA-enriched essential amino acid supplement extends the lifespan of mice.

== See also ==
- Branched-chain alpha-keto acid dehydrogenase complex
- BCKDK deficiency—insufficient levels of BCAA in the organism
