= Biotin–protein ligase =

Enzyme found in humans

HLCS

Identifiers
- Aliases: HLCS, HCS, holocarboxylase synthetase
- External IDs: OMIM: 609018; MGI: 894646; GeneCards: HLCS
Enzyme activity
EC #	BRENDA	ExPASy	KEGG	MetaCyc
6.3.4.9	↗	↗	↗	↗
6.3.4.10	↗	↗	↗	↗
6.3.4.11	↗	↗	↗	↗
6.3.4.15	↗	↗	↗	↗

Gene location (Human)
Chr.	Chromosome 21 (human)
Band	21q22.13	Start	36,748,626 bp
Band	21q22.13	End	36,990,236 bp

Gene location (Mouse)
Chr.	Chromosome 16 (mouse)
Band	16 C4|16 55.12 cM	Start	93,929,741 bp
Band	16 C4|16 55.12 cM	End	94,114,430 bp
RNA expression pattern
Bgee	Human / Mouse (ortholog); Top expressed in: paraflocculus of cerebellum; frontal pole; middle frontal gyrus; buccal mucosa cell; testicle; gonad; stromal cell of endometrium; islet of Langerhans; parotid gland; muscle of leg / Top expressed in: granulocyte; tail of embryo; lens; retinal pigment epithelium; secondary oocyte; submandibular gland; zygote; genital tubercle; epithelium of stomach; lip; More reference expression data
BioGPS	n/a
Gene ontology
Molecular function	nucleotide binding; biotin-[propionyl-CoA-carboxylase (ATP-hydrolyzing) ligase activity]; protein homodimerization activity; biotin binding; biotin-[methylmalonyl-CoA-carboxytransferase ligase activity]; ligase activity; protein binding; catalytic activity; enzyme binding; biotin-[acetyl-CoA-carboxylase ligase activity]; ATP binding; biotin-[methylcrotonoyl-CoA-carboxylase ligase activity]; biotin-protein ligase activity
Cellular component	nuclear lamina; cytosol; nuclear matrix; mitochondrion; chromatin; cytoplasm
Biological process	biotin metabolic process; histone modification; response to biotin; metabolism; cell population proliferation
Sources:Amigo / QuickGO
Orthologs
Databases	NCBI: entry; OMA: entry
Species	Human	Mouse
Entrez	3141	110948
Ensembl	ENSG00000159267	ENSMUSG00000040820
UniProt	P50747	Q920N2
RefSeq (mRNA)	NM_000411; NM_001242784; NM_001242785; NM_001352514; NM_001352515 NM_001352516; NM_001352517; NM_001352518	NM_139145; NM_001360045
RefSeq (protein)	NP_000402; NP_001229713; NP_001229714; NP_001339443; NP_001339444 NP_001339445; NP_001339446; NP_001339447	NP_631884; NP_001346974
Location (UCSC)	Chr 21: 36.75 – 36.99 Mb	Chr 16: 93.93 – 94.11 Mb
PubMed search
- Wikidata
View/Edit Human	View/Edit Mouse

Biotin—[propionyl-CoA-carboxylase (ATP-hydrolyzing)] ligase

Identifiers
- EC no.: 6.3.4.10
- CAS no.: 37318-67-5

Databases
- BRENDA: enzyme data
- ExPASy: NiceZyme view
- KEGG: enzyme entry
- MetaCyc: metabolic pathway
- Rhea: reactions
- PDB structures: RCSB PDB PDBe PDBsum
- Gene Ontology: AmiGO / QuickGO
Search
- PMC: articles
- PubMed: articles
- NCBI: proteins

Biotin–protein ligase, also called holocarboxylase synthetase, is a multi-functional enzyme that in humans is encoded by the gene HLCS. This enzyme functions to biotinylate (attach a biotin) to 4 different enzymes that the require it as a cofactor: acetyl-CoA carboxylase, pyruvate carboxylase, propionyl-CoA carboxylase, and methylcrotonyl-CoA carboxylase.

Biotin (B_{7}) is a B vitamin found in foods such as liver, egg yolks, and milk. It's required as a cofactor for the above mentioned carboxylases which are involved in many critical cellular functions, including the production and breakdown of proteins, fats, and carbohydrates.

== Function ==
HLCS biotinates four separate proteins (which themselves are enzymes), and each of these reactions has a different associated enzyme class. As part of the biotin–protein ligase enzyme class (EC 6.3.4.15), HLCS catalyses the following chemical reaction:

biotin + L-lysyl-[protein] + ATP $\rightleftharpoons$ N(6)-biotinyl-L-lysyl-[protein] + AMP + diphosphate + H^{+}

If it is acting on a methylmalonyl-CoA carboxytransferase enzyme, it is called a biotin-transcarboxylase synthetase (EC 6.3.4.9):

ATP + biotin + apo-methylmalonyl-CoA-carboxyltransferase $\rightleftharpoons$ AMP + diphosphate + methylmalonyl-CoA-carboxyltransferase

If it's acting on a propionyl-CoA carboxylase enzyme, it's called a holocarboxylase synthetase (EC 6.3.4.10):

ATP + biotin + apo-propionyl-CoA carboxylase $\rightleftharpoons$ AMP + diphosphate + propionyl-CoA carboxylase

And finally if it is acting on methylcrotonoyl-CoA carboxylase, it is called a biotin–[methylcrotonoyl-CoA-carboxylase] ligase (EC 6.3.4.11):

ATP + biotin + apo-methylcrotonoyl-CoA-carboxylase $\rightleftharpoons$ AMP + diphosphate + methylcrotonoyl-CoA-carboxylase

=== Gene regulation ===
Holocarboxylase synthetase may also play a role in regulating the activity of genes. In the nucleus, the enzyme likely attaches biotin molecules to histones, which are structural proteins that bind to DNA and give chromosomes their shape. Changing the shape of histones may help determine whether certain genes are turned on or off; however, it is not known how adding biotin affects gene regulation.

== Distribution of enzymes ==
Animal and fungus orthologs of the human enzyme are the only enzymes reported in expasy with biotin-transcarboxylase synthetase (EC 6.3.4.9) or holocarboxylase synthetase (EC 6.3.4.10) activity. A chloroplastic biotin–protein ligase enzyme (encoded by the plant gene HCS1) has been reported in certain plants (Mouse-ear cress) which has (EC 6.3.4.11) and (EC 6.3.4.15) activity. Finally, (EC 6.3.4.15) activity has been reported for certain multifunctional enzymes in bacteria denoted birA and birA/coaX.

== Related conditions ==
Holocarboxylase synthetase deficiency: About 30 mutations in the HLCS gene have been identified in people with holocarboxylase synthetase deficiency. Most of these mutations substitute one amino acid (a building block of proteins) for another amino acid in the holocarboxylase synthetase enzyme. Many of the known mutations occur in a region of the enzyme that binds to biotin. These mutations reduce the enzyme's ability to attach biotin to carboxylases and histones. Without biotin, carboxylases remain inactive and are unable to process proteins, fats, and carbohydrates. A lack of holocarboxylase synthetase activity may also alter the regulation of certain genes that are important for normal development. Researchers believe that these disruptions in important cellular functions lead to breathing problems, skin rashes, and the other characteristic signs and symptoms of holocarboxylase synthetase deficiency.

== See also ==
- Biotinylation
