= VNN (disambiguation) =

VNN may refer to:

- Republic of Vietnam Navy, the navy of the former country of South Vietnam
- Vanguard News Network, a Neo-Nazi and white supremacist website
- Votorantim Novos Negócios, Brazilian private equity firm
- Volksnationalisten Nederland ("People's Nationalists Netherlands"), former Dutch political party
- Vought News Network (VNN): Seven on 7 with Cameron Coleman, a 2021 promotional web series
- Viral nervous necrosis, fish disease caused by viruses in the genus Betanodavirus

== See also ==
- VNN1 and VNN2, human genes encoding proteins of the Vanin family of proteins
