= List of causes of shortness of breath =

Many different conditions can lead to the feeling of dyspnea (shortness of breath). DiagnosisPro, an online medical expert system, listed 497 in October 2010. The most common cardiovascular causes are acute myocardial infarction and congestive heart failure while common pulmonary causes include: chronic obstructive pulmonary disease, asthma, pneumothorax, and pneumonia.

== Pulmonary ==
- Obstructive lung diseases
  - Asthma
  - Bronchitis
  - Chronic obstructive pulmonary disease
  - Cystic fibrosis
  - Emphysema
  - Hookworm disease
- Diseases of lung parenchyma and pleura
  - Contagious
    - Anthrax through inhalation of Bacillus anthracis
    - Pneumonia
    - COVID-19
  - Non-contagious
    - Fibrosing alveolitis
    - Atelectasis
    - Hypersensitivity pneumonitis
    - Interstitial lung disease
    - Lung cancer
    - Pleural effusion
    - Pneumoconiosis
    - Pneumothorax
    - Non-cardiogenic pulmonary edema or acute respiratory distress syndrome
    - Sarcoidosis
- Pulmonary vascular diseases
  - Acute or recurrent pulmonary emboli
  - Pulmonary hypertension, primary or secondary
  - Pulmonary veno-occlusive disease
  - Superior vena cava syndrome

== Other causes ==
- Obstruction of the airway
  - Cancer of the larynx or pharynx
  - Empty nose syndrome
  - Pulmonary aspiration
  - Epiglottitis
  - Laryngeal edema
  - Vocal cord dysfunction
- Immobilization of the diaphragm
  - Lesion of the phrenic nerve
  - Polycystic liver disease
  - Tumor in the diaphragm
- Restriction of the chest volume
  - Ankylosing spondylitis
  - Broken ribs
  - Kyphosis of the spine
  - Obesity
  - Costochondritis
  - Pectus excavatum
  - Scoliosis
- Disorders of the cardiovascular system
  - Aortic dissection
  - Cardiomyopathy
  - Congenital heart disease
  - CREST syndrome
  - Heart failure
  - Ischaemic heart disease
  - Malignant hypertension
  - Pericardium disorders, including:
    - Cardiac tamponade
    - Constrictive pericarditis
    - Pericardial effusion
  - Pulmonary edema
  - Pulmonary embolism
  - Pulmonary hypertension
  - Valvular heart disease
- Disorders of the blood and metabolism
  - Anemia
  - Hypothyroidism
  - Adrenal insufficiency
  - Metabolic acidosis
  - Sepsis
  - Leukemia
  - Holocarboxylase synthetase deficiency
- Disorders of the neurological system
  - Ischemic stroke (when it occurs in the brain stem)
  - Brain bleed (when it occurs in the brain stem)
- Disorders affecting breathing nerves and muscles
  - Amyotrophic lateral sclerosis
  - Guillain–Barré syndrome
  - Multiple sclerosis
  - Myasthenia gravis
  - Parsonage Turner syndrome
  - Eaton-Lambert syndrome
  - Chronic fatigue syndrome
- Immune disorders
  - Dyspnea can be a symptom of mast cell activation syndrome (MCAS).
- Psychological conditions
  - Anxiety disorders and panic attacks
- Medications
  - Fentanyl
- Other
  - Carbon monoxide poisoning
  - Pregnancy
