= B vitamins =

Group of vitamins

B vitamins are a class of water-soluble vitamins that play important roles in cell metabolism and synthesis of red blood cells. They are a chemically diverse class of compounds.

Dietary supplements containing all eight are referred to as a vitamin B complex. Individual B vitamins are referred to by B-number or by chemical name, such as B_{1} for thiamine, B_{2} for riboflavin, and B_{3} for niacin, while some are more commonly recognized by name than by number, such as pantothenic acid (B_{5}), biotin (B_{7}), and folate (B_{9}). B vitamins are present in protein-rich foods, such as fish, poultry, meat, dairy products, and eggs; they are also found in leafy green vegetables, beans, and peas. Fortified foods, such as breakfast cereals, baked products, and infant formulas, may contain B vitamins.

Each B vitamin is either a cofactor (generally a coenzyme) for key metabolic processes or is a precursor needed to make one.

== List of B vitamins ==
List of B vitamins
Vitamin	Name	Description
Vitamin B_{1}	Thiamine	A coenzyme in the catabolism of sugars and amino acids.
Vitamin B_{2}	Riboflavin	A precursor of coenzymes called FAD and FMN, which are needed for flavoprotein enzyme reactions, including activation of other vitamins
Vitamin B_{3}	Niacin (nicotinic acid)	A precursor of coenzymes called NAD and NADP, which are needed in many metabolic processes.
Vitamin B_{3}	Niacinamide	A precursor of coenzymes called NAD and NADP, which are needed in many metabolic processes.
Vitamin B_{3}	Nicotinamide riboside	A precursor of coenzymes called NAD and NADP, which are needed in many metabolic processes.
Vitamin B_{5}	Pantothenic acid	A precursor of coenzyme A and therefore needed to metabolize many molecules.
Vitamin B_{6}	Pyridoxine	A coenzyme in many enzymatic reactions in metabolism.
Vitamin B_{6}	Pyridoxal	A coenzyme in many enzymatic reactions in metabolism.
Vitamin B_{6}	Pyridoxamine	A coenzyme in many enzymatic reactions in metabolism.
Vitamin B_{7}	Biotin	A coenzyme for carboxylase enzymes, needed for synthesis of fatty acids and in gluconeogenesis.
Vitamin B_{9}	Folate	A precursor needed to make, repair, and methylate DNA; a cofactor in various reactions; especially important in aiding rapid cell division and growth, such as in infancy and pregnancy.
Vitamin B_{12}	Cobalamins	Commonly cyanocobalamin or methylcobalamin in vitamin supplements. A coenzyme involved in the metabolism of all animal cells, especially affecting DNA synthesis and regulation, but also fatty acid metabolism and amino acid metabolism.

Note: Other substances once thought to be vitamins were given B-numbers, but were disqualified once discovered to be either manufactured by the body or not essential for life. See § Related compounds for numbers 4, 8, 10, 11, and others.

== Sources ==
B vitamins are found in abundance in meat, eggs, and dairy products. Processed carbohydrates such as sugar and white flour tend to have lower B vitamin content than their unprocessed counterparts. For this reason, it is common in many countries (including the United States) that the B vitamins thiamine, riboflavin, niacin, and folic acid are added back to white flour after processing. This is referred to as "enriched flour" on food labels. B vitamins are particularly concentrated in meat such as turkey, tuna and liver.

Sources for B vitamins also include spinach, legumes (pulses or beans), whole grains, asparagus, potatoes, bananas, chili peppers, breakfast cereals. The B_{12} vitamin is not abundantly available from plant products (although it has been found in moderate abundance in fermented vegetable products, certain seaweeds, and in certain mushrooms, with the bioavailability of the vitamin in these cases remaining uncertain), making B_{12} deficiency a legitimate concern for those maintaining a vegan diet. Manufacturers of plant-based foods will sometimes report B_{12} content, leading to confusion about what sources yield B_{12}. The confusion arises because the standard US Pharmacopeia (USP) method for measuring the B_{12} content does not measure the B_{12} directly. Instead, it measures a bacterial response to the food. Chemical variants of the B_{12} vitamin found in plant sources are active for bacteria, but cannot be used by the human body. This same phenomenon can cause significant over-reporting of B_{12} content in other types of foods as well.

A common way to increase vitamin B intake is by using dietary supplements. B vitamins are commonly added to energy drinks, many of which have been marketed with large amounts of B vitamins.

Because they are soluble in water, excess B vitamins are generally readily excreted, although individual absorption, use and metabolism may vary. The elderly and athletes may need to supplement their intake of B_{12} and other B vitamins due to problems in absorption and increased needs for energy production. In cases of severe deficiency, B vitamins, especially B_{12}, may also be delivered by injection to reverse deficiencies. Both type 1 and type 2 diabetics may also be advised to supplement thiamine based on high prevalence of low plasma thiamine concentration and increased thiamine clearance associated with diabetes. Also, folate deficiency in early embryo development has been linked to neural tube defects. Thus, women planning to become pregnant are usually encouraged to increase daily dietary folate intake or take a supplement.

== Molecular functions ==
Vitamin	Name	Structure	Molecular function
Vitamin B_{1}	Thiamine		Thiamine plays a central role in the release of energy from carbohydrates. It is involved in RNA and DNA production, as well as nerve function. Its active form is a coenzyme called thiamine pyrophosphate (TPP), which takes part in the conversion of pyruvate to acetyl coenzyme A in metabolism.
Vitamin B_{2}	Riboflavin		Riboflavin is involved in release of energy in the electron transport chain, the citric acid cycle, as well as the catabolism of fatty acids (beta oxidation).
Vitamin B_{3}	Niacin		Niacin is composed of two structures: nicotinic acid and nicotinamide. There are two co-enzyme forms of niacin: nicotinamide adenine dinucleotide (NAD) and nicotinamide adenine dinucleotide phosphate (NADP). Both play an important role in energy transfer reactions in the metabolism of glucose, fat and alcohol. NAD carries hydrogens and their electrons during metabolic reactions, including the pathway from the citric acid cycle to the electron transport chain. NADP is a coenzyme in lipid and nucleic acid synthesis.
Vitamin B_{5}	Pantothenic acid		Pantothenic acid is involved in the oxidation of fatty acids and carbohydrates. Coenzyme A, which can be synthesised from pantothenic acid, is involved in the synthesis of amino acids, fatty acids, ketone bodies, cholesterol, phospholipids, steroid hormones, neurotransmitters (such as acetylcholine), and antibodies.
Vitamin B_{6}	Pyridoxine, pyridoxal, pyridoxamine		The active form pyridoxal 5'-phosphate (PLP) (depicted) serves as a cofactor in many enzyme reactions mainly in amino acid metabolism including biosynthesis of neurotransmitters.
Vitamin B_{7}	Biotin		Biotin plays a key role in the metabolism of lipids, proteins and carbohydrates. It is a critical co-enzyme of four carboxylases: acetyl CoA carboxylase, which is involved in the synthesis of fatty acids from acetate; pyruvate CoA carboxylase, involved in gluconeogenesis; β-methylcrotonyl CoA carboxylase, involved in the metabolism of leucine; and propionyl CoA carboxylase, which is involved in the metabolism of energy, amino acids and cholesterol.
Vitamin B_{9}	Folate		Folate acts as a co-enzyme in the form of tetrahydrofolate (THF), which is involved in the transfer of single-carbon units in the metabolism of nucleic acids and amino acids. THF is involved in purine and pyrimidine nucleotide synthesis, so is needed for normal cell division, especially during pregnancy and infancy, which are times of rapid growth. Folate also aids in erythropoiesis, the production of red blood cells.
Vitamin B_{12}	Cobalamin		Vitamin B_{12} is involved in the cellular metabolism of carbohydrates, proteins and lipids. It is essential in the production of blood cells in bone marrow, and for nerve sheaths and proteins. Vitamin B_{12} functions as a co-enzyme in intermediary metabolism for the methionine synthase reaction with methylcobalamin, and the methylmalonyl CoA mutase reaction with adenosylcobalamin.

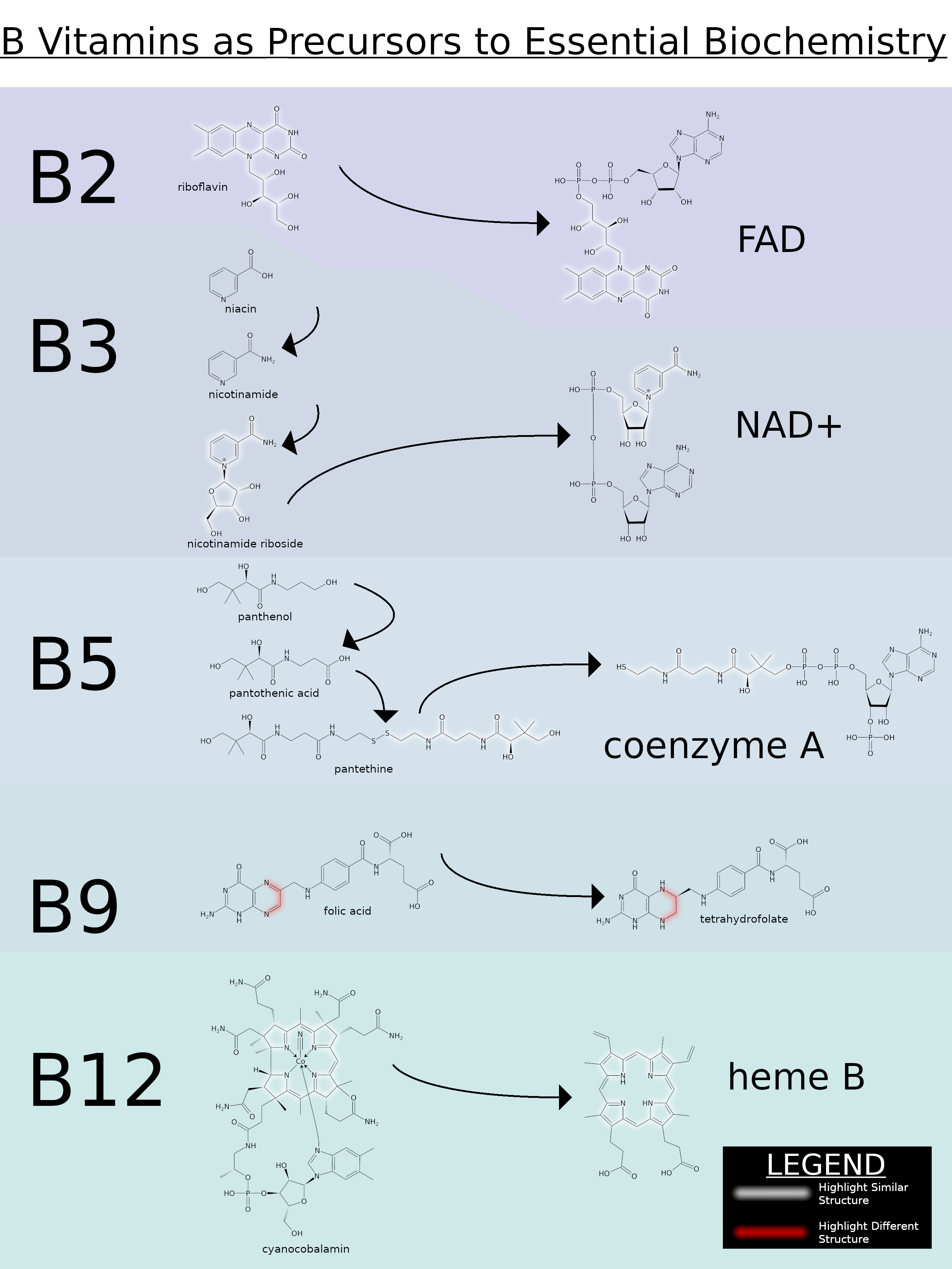
A diagram of the chemical structure of 5 classes of vitamin B (B2, B3, B5, B9, and B12) and the essential biochemical reactants that they are precursors to.

To the right, a diagram of some of the major B vitamins (2, 3, 5, 9, and 12) are shown as precursors for certain essential biochemical reactants (FAD, NAD+, coenzyme A, tetrahydrofolate, and heme B respectively). The structural similarities between them are highlighted, which illustrates the precursor nature of many B vitamins while also showing the functionality of the end product used by essential reactions to support human, animal, or cellular life.

FAD, NAD+, and coenzyme A are all essential for the catabolic release of free energy (dG) to power the activity of the cell and more complex life forms. See the article on Catabolism for more details on how these three essential biochemical reactants help support life.

Tetrahydrofolate is a necessary co-reactant for synthesizing some amino acids, such as glycine. Heme B is the porphyrin derivative macrocycle molecule that holds the iron atom in place in hemoglobin, allowing for the transportation of oxygen through blood.

== Deficiencies ==
Several named vitamin deficiency diseases may result from the lack of sufficient B vitamins. Deficiencies of other B vitamins result in symptoms that are not part of a named deficiency disease.

Vitamin number	Chemical name	Effects of deficiency
B_{1}	thiamine	Thiamine deficiency causes beriberi. Symptoms of this disease of the nervous system include weight loss, emotional disturbances, Wernicke encephalopathy (impaired sensory perception), weakness and pain in the limbs, periods of irregular heartbeat, and edema (swelling of bodily tissues). Heart failure and death may occur in advanced cases. Chronic thiamine deficiency can also cause alcoholic Korsakoff syndrome, an irreversible dementia characterized by amnesia and compensatory confabulation.
B_{2}	riboflavin	Riboflavin deficiency can cause ariboflavinosis, which may result in cheilosis (cracks in the lips), high sensitivity to sunlight, angular cheilitis, glossitis (inflammation of the tongue), seborrheic dermatitis or pseudo-syphilis (particularly affecting the scrotum or labia majora and the mouth), pharyngitis (sore throat), hyperemia, and edema of the pharyngeal and oral mucosa.
B_{3}	niacin	Niacin deficiency, along with a deficiency of tryptophan, causes pellagra. Symptoms include aggression, dermatitis, insomnia, weakness, mental confusion, and diarrhea. In advanced cases, pellagra may lead to dementia and death (the 3(+1) D's: dermatitis, diarrhea, dementia, and death).
B_{5}	pantothenic acid	Although pantothenic acid deficiency is uncommon, it can result in acne and paresthesia.
B_{6}	pyridoxine, pyridoxal, pyridoxamine	Deficiency of all B6 vitamins causes seborrhoeic dermatitis-like eruptions, pink eye and neurological symptoms (e.g. epilepsy).
B_{7}	biotin	Biotin deficiency does not typically cause symptoms in adults, other than cosmetic issues such as decreased hair and nail growth, but may lead to impaired growth and neurological disorders in infants. Multiple carboxylase deficiency, an inborn error of metabolism, can lead to biotin deficiency even when dietary biotin intake is normal.
B_{9}	folic acid, folate	Folic acid deficiency results in a macrocytic anemia and elevated levels of homocysteine. Deficiency in pregnant women can lead to birth defects, particularly neural tube defects such as spina bifida and anencephaly.
B_{12}	cobalamins	Cobalamin deficiency results in a macrocytic anemia, elevated methylmalonic acid and homocysteine, peripheral neuropathy, sense loss, change in mobility, memory loss, and other cognitive deficits. It is most likely to occur among elderly people, as absorption through the gut declines with age; the autoimmune disease pernicious anemia is another common cause. It can also cause symptoms of mania and psychosis. Untreated, it is possible to cause irreversible damage to the brain and nerve system; in rare extreme cases, paralysis can result.

== Side effects ==
Because water-soluble B vitamins are eliminated in the urine, taking large doses of most B vitamins usually only produces transient side effects (with the only exception being pyridoxine). General side effects may include restlessness, nausea, and insomnia. These side effects are almost always caused by dietary supplements and not food.

Vitamin number	Tolerable upper intake level (UL)	Harmful effects
B_{1}	None	No known toxicity from oral intake. There are some reports of anaphylaxis caused by high-dose thiamin injections into the vein or muscle. However, the doses were greater than the quantity humans can physically absorb from oral intake.
B_{2}	None	No evidence of toxicity based on limited human and animal studies. The only evidence of adverse effects associated with riboflavin comes from in vitro studies showing the production of reactive oxygen species (free radicals) when riboflavin was exposed to intense visible and UV light.
B_{3}	US UL: 35 mg as a dietary supplement	Intake of 3000 mg/day of nicotinamide and 1500 mg/day of nicotinic acid are associated with nausea, vomiting, and signs and symptoms of liver toxicity. Other effects may include glucose intolerance, and (reversible) ocular effects. Additionally, the nicotinic acid form may cause vasodilatory effects, also known as flushing, including redness of the skin, often accompanied by an itching, tingling, or mild burning sensation, which is also often accompanied by pruritus, headaches, and increased intracranial blood flow, and occasionally accompanied by pain. Medical practitioners prescribe recommended doses up to 2000 mg per day of niacin in either immediate-release or slow-release formats, to lower plasma triglycerides and low-density lipiprotein cholesterol.
B_{5}	None	No toxicity known.
B_{6}	US UL: 100 mg/day; EU UL: 12.5 mg/day	Causes megavitamin-B_{6} syndrome.
B_{7}	None	No toxicity known.
B_{9} (Folate)	1 mg/day	Masks vitamin B_{12} deficiency.
B_{12}	None established	Skin and spinal lesions. Acne-like rash (causality is not conclusively established).

== Discovery ==
Vitamin	Name	Discoverer	Date	Notes
Vitamin B_{1}	Thiamine	Umetaro Suzuki	1910	Failed to gain publicity.
Vitamin B_{1}	Thiamine	Casimir Funk	1912	
Vitamin B_{2}	Riboflavin	D. T. Smith and E. G. Hendrick	1926	Max Tishler invented methods for synthesizing it.
Vitamin B_{3}	Niacin	Conrad Elvehjem	1937	
Vitamin B_{5}	Pantothenic acid	Roger J. Williams	1933	
Vitamin B_{6}	Pyridoxine etc.	Paul Gyorgy	1934	
Vitamin B_{7}	Biotin	Research by multiple independent groups in the early 1900s; credits for discovery include Margaret Averil Boas (1927), Paul Gyorgy (1939, as Vitamin H), and Dean Burk.		
Vitamin B_{9}	Folic acid	Lucy Wills	1933	
Vitamin B_{12}	Cobalamins	Five people have been awarded Nobel Prizes for direct and indirect studies of vitamin B_{12}: George Whipple, George Minot and William Murphy (1934), Alexander R. Todd (1957), and Dorothy Hodgkin (1964).		

== Related compounds ==
Many of the following substances have been referred to as vitamins as they were once believed to be vitamins. They are no longer considered as such, and the numbers that were assigned to them now form the "gaps" in the true series of B-complex vitamins described above (for example, there is no vitamin B_{4}). Some of them, though not essential to humans, are essential in the diets of other organisms; others have no known nutritional value and may even be toxic under certain conditions.

- Vitamin B_{4}: can refer to the distinct chemicals choline, adenine, or carnitine.
  - Choline is synthesized by the human body, but not sufficiently to maintain good health, and is now considered an essential dietary nutrient.
  - Adenine is a nucleobase synthesized by the human body.
  - Carnitine is an essential dietary nutrient for certain worms, but not for humans.
- Vitamin B_{8}: adenosine monophosphate (AMP), also known as adenylic acid. Vitamin B_{8} may also refer to inositol.
- Vitamin B_{10}: para-aminobenzoic acid (pABA or PABA), a chemical component of the folate molecule produced by plants and bacteria, and found in many foods. It is best known as a UV-blocking sunscreen applied to the skin, and is sometimes taken orally for certain medical conditions.
- Vitamin B_{11}: pteroylheptaglutamic acid (PHGA; chick growth factor). Vitamin Bc-conjugate was also found to be identical to PHGA. Derivative of folate ("pteroylmonoglutamic acid" in this nomenclature).
- Vitamin B_{13}: orotic acid.
- Vitamin B_{14}: cell proliferant, anti-anemia, rat growth factor, and antitumor pterin phosphate, named by Earl R. Norris. Isolated from human urine at 0.33ppm (later in blood), but later abandoned by him as further evidence did not confirm this. He also claimed this was not xanthopterin.
- Vitamin B_{15}: pangamic acid, also known as pangamate. Promoted in various forms as a dietary supplement and drug; considered unsafe and subject to seizure by the US Food and Drug Administration.
- Vitamin B_{16}: dimethylglycine (DMG) is synthesized by the human body from choline.
- Vitamin B_{17}: pseudoscientific name for the poisonous compound amygdalin, also known as "laetrile" or by the equally pseudoscientific name "nitrilosides" despite the fact that it is a single compound. Amygdalin can be found in various plants, but is most commonly extracted from apricot pits and other similar fruit kernels. Amygdalin is hydrolyzed by various intestinal enzymes to form, among other things, hydrogen cyanide, which is toxic to human beings when exposed to a high enough dosage. Some proponents claim that amygdalin is effective in cancer treatment and prevention, despite its toxicity and a lack of scientific evidence.
- Vitamin B_{20}: L-carnitine.
- Vitamin B_{f}: carnitine.
- Vitamin B_{m}: myo-inositol, also called "mouse antialopaecia factor".
- Vitamin B_{p}: "antiperosis factor", which prevents perosis, a leg disorder, in chicks; can be replaced by choline and manganese salts.
- Vitamin B_{T}: carnitine.
- Vitamin B_{v}: a type of B_{6} other than pyridoxine.
- Vitamin B_{W}: a type of biotin other than d-biotin.
- Vitamin B_{x}: an alternative name for both pABA (see vitamin B_{10}) and pantothenic acid.
