= Biotin deficiency =

- Biotin
- Specialty: Endocrinology

Biotin deficiency is a nutritional disorder which can become serious, even fatal, if allowed to progress untreated. It can occur in people of any age, ancestry, or of either sex. Biotin is part of the B vitamin family. Biotin deficiency rarely occurs among healthy people because the daily requirement of biotin is low, as many foods provide adequate amounts of it, intestinal bacteria synthesize small amounts of it, and the body effectively scavenges and recycles it in the kidneys during production of urine.

Genetic disorders such as multiple carboxylase deficiency (MCD) (which includes biotinidase deficiency and holocarboxylase synthetase deficiency) can also lead to inborn or late-onset forms of biotin deficiency. In all cases – dietary, genetic, or otherwise – supplementation with biotin is the primary (and usually only) method of treatment. The prognosis for congenital MCD is good if biotin supplementation is begun quickly after birth and carried on throughout the patient's life.

The average dietary intake of biotin ranges between 35 and 70 micrograms/day in the western population.

== Signs and symptoms ==
=== Physical ===
- Rashes including red, patchy ones near openings (e.g. erythematous periorofacial macular rash)
- Hair loss (alopecia)
- Conjunctivitis
- Brittle nails
- Generalized muscular pains (myalgia)
- Paresthesias (pins and needles) and numbness in the extremities

=== Psychological ===
- Hallucinations
- Lethargy
- Mild depression
- Fatigue, drowsiness and somnolence

== Causes ==
1. Total parenteral nutrition without biotin supplementation: Several cases of biotin deficiency in patients receiving prolonged total parenteral nutrition (TPN) therapy without added biotin have been reported. Therefore, all patients receiving TPN must also receive biotin at the recommended daily dose, especially if TPN therapy is expected to last more than 1 week. All hospital pharmacies currently include biotin in TPN preparations.
2. Protein deficiency (not certain): A shortage of proteins involved in biotin homeostasis can cause biotin deficiency. The main problems involved in biotin homeostasis are HCS, BTD (biotinidase deficiency) and SMVT
3. Anticonvulsant therapy: Prolonged use of certain drugs (especially highly common prescription anti-seizure medications such as phenytoin, primidone, and carbamazepine), may lead to biotin deficiency; however, valproic acid therapy is less likely to cause this condition. Some anticonvulsants (antiepileptic drugs) inhibit biotin transport across the intestinal mucosa. Evidence suggests that these anticonvulsants accelerate biotin catabolism, which means that it's necessary for people to take supplemental biotin, in addition to the usual minimum daily requirements, if they're treated with anticonvulsant medication(s) that have been linked to biotin deficiency.
4. Severe malnourishment
5. Prolonged oral antibiotic therapy: Prolonged use of oral antibiotics has been associated with biotin deficiency. Alterations in the intestinal flora caused by the prolonged administration of antibiotics are presumed to be the basis for biotin deficiency.
6. Genetic mutation: Mikati et al. (2006) reported a case of partial biotinidase deficiency (plasma biotinidase level of 1.3 nm/min/mL) in a 7-month-old boy. The boy presented with perinatal distress followed by developmental delay, hypotonia, seizures, and infantile spasms without alopecia or dermatitis. The child's neurologic symptoms abated following biotin supplementation and antiepileptic drug therapy. DNA mutational analysis revealed that the child was homozygous for a novel E64K mutation and that his mother and father were heterozygous for the novel E64K mutation.

=== Potential causes ===
1. Smoking: Recent studies suggest that smoking can lead to marginal biotin deficiency because it speeds up biotin catabolism (especially in women).
2. Excessive alcohol consumption (causes a significant reduction in plasma biotin levels)
3. Excessive consumption of antidiuretics or inadequate levels of antidiuretic hormone
4. Intestinal malabsorption caused by short bowel syndrome

== Biochemistry ==
Biotin is a coenzyme for five carboxylases in the human body (propionyl-CoA carboxylase, methylcrotonyl-CoA carboxylase, pyruvate carboxylase, and 2 forms of acetyl-CoA carboxylase.) Therefore, biotin is essential for amino acid catabolism, gluconeogenesis, and fatty acid metabolism. Biotin is also necessary for gene stability because it is covalently attached to histones. Biotinylated histones play a role in repression of transposable elements and some genes. Normally, the amount of biotin in the body is regulated by dietary intake, biotin transporters (monocarboxylate transporter 1 and sodium-dependent multivitamin transporter), peptidyl hydrolase biotinidase (BTD), and the protein ligase holocarboxylase synthetase. When any of these regulatory factors are inhibited, biotin deficiency could occur.

== Diagnosis ==
The only reliable method for determining biotin deficiency is the abundance of biotinylated 3-methylcrotonyl-CoA carboxylase and propionyl-CoA carboxylase in lymphocytes. The level of biotin in urine can be used to identify biotin-supplemented individuals, and the level of 3-hydroxyisovaleric acid in urine can (unreliably) detect biotin-deficient patients.

== Treatment ==
In the United States, biotin supplements are readily available without a prescription in amounts ranging from 300 to 10,000 micrograms. 30 micrograms daily is identified as Adequate Intake for men and women 19 years and older. 35 micrograms daily is required for lactating women.

Most healthy individuals meet these recommended intakes, however many still take up to 500 to 1,000 micrograms of biotin daily.

== Epidemiology ==
Deficiency is rare in locations where egg-white enriched or ketogenic diets are common. Pregnancy, however, alters biomarkers of biotin and despite a regular biotin intake, approximately half of the pregnant women in the U.S. are marginally biotin deficient.

== See also ==
- Biotinidase deficiency
- Holocarboxylase synthetase deficiency
- Multiple carboxylase deficiency

== Possible references ==
- Adhisivam B, Mahto D, Mahadevan S (March 2007). "Biotin responsive limb weakness". Indian Pediatr. 44 (3): 228–30. PMID 17413203.
- Baykal T, Gokcay G, Gokdemir Y, Demir F, Seckin Y, Demirkol M, Jensen K, Wolf B (2005). "Asymptomatic adults and older siblings with biotinidase deficiency ascertained by family studies of index cases". J. Inherit. Metab. Dis. 28 (6): 903–12. doi:10.1007/s10545-005-0161-3. PMID 16435182. S2CID 22277450.
- Boas MA (1927). "The Effect of Desiccation upon the Nutritive Properties of Egg-white". Biochem. J. 21 (3): 712–724.1. doi:10.1042/bj0210712. PMC 1251968. PMID 16743887.
- Dobrowolski SF, Angeletti J, Banas RA, Naylor EW (February 2003). "Real time PCR assays to detect common mutations in the biotinidase gene and application of mutational analysis to newborn screening for biotinidase deficiency". Mol. Genet. Metab. 78 (2): 100–7. doi:10.1016/S1096-7192(02)00231-7. PMID 12618081.
- Forbes GM, Forbes A (1997). "Micronutrient status in patients receiving home parenteral nutrition". Nutrition. 13 (11–12): 941–4. doi:10.1016/S0899-9007(97)00334-1. PMID 9433708.
- Genc GA, Sivri-Kalkanoğlu HS, Dursun A, Aydin HI, Tokatli A, Sennaroglu L, Belgin E, Wolf B, Coşkun T (February 2007). "Audiologic findings in children with biotinidase deficiency in Turkey". Int. J. Pediatr. Otorhinolaryngol. 71 (2): 333–9. doi:10.1016/j.ijporl.2006.11.001. PMID 17161472.
- González EC, Marrero N, Frómeta A, Herrera D, Castells E, Pérez PL (July 2006). "Qualitative colorimetric ultramicroassay for the detection of biotinidase deficiency in newborns". Clin. Chim. Acta. 369 (1): 35–9. doi:10.1016/j.cca.2006.01.009. PMID 16480705.
- Hassan YI, Zempleni J (July 2006). "Epigenetic regulation of chromatin structure and gene function by biotin". J. Nutr. 136 (7): 1763–5. doi:10.1093/jn/136.7.1763. PMC 1479604. PMID 16772434.
- Higuchi R, Mizukoshi M, Koyama H, Kitano N, Koike M (February 1998). "Intractable diaper dermatitis as an early sign of biotin deficiency". Acta Paediatr. 87 (2): 228–9. doi:10.1080/08035259850157732. PMID 9512215.
- László A, Schuler EA, Sallay E, Endreffy E, Somogyi C, Várkonyi A, Havass Z, Jansen KP, Wolf B (2003). "Neonatal screening for biotinidase deficiency in Hungary: clinical, biochemical and molecular studies". J. Inherit. Metab. Dis. 26 (7): 693–8. doi:10.1023/B:BOLI.0000005622.89660.59. PMID 14707518. S2CID 12601233.
- Mock DM (February 1999). "Biotin status: which are valid indicators and how do we know?". J. Nutr. 129 (2S Suppl): 498S–503S. doi:10.1093/jn/129.2.498S. PMID 10064317.
- Mock DM (December 1991). "Skin manifestations of biotin deficiency". Semin Dermatol. 10 (4): 296–302. PMID 1764357.
- Möslinger D, Mühl A, Suormala T, Baumgartner R, Stöckler-Ipsiroglu S (December 2003). "Molecular characterisation and neuropsychological outcome of 21 patients with profound biotinidase deficiency detected by newborn screening and family studies". Eur. J. Pediatr. 162 (Suppl 1): S46–9. doi:10.1007/s00431-003-1351-3. PMID 14628140. S2CID 6490712.
- Neto EC, Schulte J, Rubim R, Lewis E, DeMari J, Castilhos C, Brites A, Giugliani R, Jensen KP, Wolf B (March 2004). "Newborn screening for biotinidase deficiency in Brazil: biochemical and molecular characterizations". Braz. J. Med. Biol. Res. 37 (3): 295–9. doi:10.1590/S0100-879X2004000300001. hdl:10183/21194. PMID 15060693.
- Schulpis KH, Gavrili S, Tjamouranis J, Karikas GA, Kapiki A, Costalos C (May 2003). "The effect of neonatal jaundice on biotinidase activity". Early Hum. Dev. 72 (1): 15–24. doi:10.1016/S0378-3782(02)00097-X. PMID 12706308.
- Thompson, J, Manore M, Sheeshka J (2010). "Nutrients involved in energy metabolism and blood health". In Bennett G, Swieg C, et al. (eds.). Nutrition: A functional Approach. Toronto: Pearson Canada. p. 353. ISBN 9780321740212.
- Velázquez A (1997). "Biotin deficiency in protein-energy malnutrition: implications for nutritional homeostasis and individuality". Nutrition. 13 (11–12): 991–2. doi:10.1016/S0899-9007(97)00345-6. PMID 9433719.
- Weber P, Scholl S, Baumgartner ER (July 2004). "Outcome in patients with profound biotinidase deficiency: relevance of newborn screening". Dev Med Child Neurol. 46 (7): 481–4. doi:10.1111/j.1469-8749.2004.tb00509.x. PMID 15230462.
- Welling DB (August 2007). "Long-term follow-up of hearing loss in biotinidase deficiency". J. Child Neurol. 22 (8): 1055. doi:10.1177/0883073807305789. PMID 17761663. S2CID 39911504.
- Wiznitzer M, Bangert BA (July 2003). "Biotinidase deficiency: clinical and MRI findings consistent with myelopathy". Pediatr. Neurol. 29 (1): 56–8. doi:10.1016/S0887-8994(03)00042-0. PMID 13679123.
- Wolf B (2001). "Disorders of biotin metabolism". In Scriver CR, Beaudet AL, et al. (eds.). The metabolic & molecular bases of inherited disease. New York: McGraw-Hill. pp. 3935–62. ISBN 978-0-07-913035-8.
