= Pimelyl-(acyl-carrier protein) methyl ester esterase =

Pimelyl-[acyl-carrier protein] methyl ester esterase

Identifiers
- EC no.: 3.1.1.85

Databases
- IntEnz: IntEnz view
- BRENDA: BRENDA entry
- ExPASy: NiceZyme view
- KEGG: KEGG entry
- MetaCyc: metabolic pathway
- PRIAM: profile
- PDB structures: RCSB PDB PDBe PDBsum
Search
- PMC: articles
- PubMed: articles
- NCBI: proteins

The enzyme Pimelyl-[acyl-carrier protein] methyl ester esterase (EC 3.1.1.85, BioH; systematic name pimelyl-[acyl-carrier protein] methyl ester hydrolase catalyses the reaction

pimelyl-[acyl-carrier protein] methyl ester + H_{2}O $\rightleftharpoons$ pimelyl-[acyl-carrier protein] + methanol

This enzyme takes part in biotin biosynthesis in Gram-negative bacteria.
