= Paul Gyorgy =

Hungarian-American biochemist (1893–1976)

Paul György
- Born: April 7, 1893; Nagyvárad, Hungary
- Died: March 1, 1976 (aged 82); Morristown, New Jersey, US
- Education: University of Budapest (M.D., 1915)
- Known for: Discovery of biotin, riboflavin, vitamin B_{6}
- Spouse: Margaret Gyrözy (née John)
- Children: 3
- Awards: John Howland Award (1968); National Medal of Science (1975)
- Scientific career
- Fields: Pediatrics, Biochemistry, Nutrition
- Workplaces: University of Heidelberg (1920-1933); Cambridge University (1933-1935); University Hospitals of Cleveland (1933-1935); Case Western Reserve University (1935-1944); Hospital of the University of Pennsylvania (1950-1957); Philadelphia General Hospital (1957-1963)

Paul György (April 7, 1893 – March 1, 1976) was a Hungarian-born American biochemist, nutritionist, and pediatrician best known for his discovery of three B vitamins: riboflavin, B_{6}, and biotin. Gyorgy was also well known for his research into the protective factors of human breast milk, particularly for his discoveries of Lactobacillus bifidus growth factor activity in human milk and its anti-staphylococcal properties. He was a recipient of the National Medal of Science in 1975 from President Gerald Ford.

== Early life and career ==
Gyorgy was born on April 7, 1893, in Nagyvárad, Hungary to a Jewish family. He was said to be an avid reader and musician as a child. His father was a general practitioner in the community. Influenced by his father's occupation and with his parents' encouragement, Gyorgy began to pursue a career in medicine. He attended the University of Budapest Medical School and graduated with Doctor of Medicine degree in 1915.

In 1920, after the end of World War I, Gyorgy was offered a job at the University of Heidelberg as an assistant to the physician and researcher Ernst Moro. He remained at the University of Heidelberg until 1933, obtaining full professorship in 1927 at the age of 34 years. It was at the University of Heidelberg that Gyorgy first discovered and isolated riboflavin along with his colleague Th. Wagner-Jauregg and the Nobel-winning chemist Richard Kuhn. Gyorgy remained at the University of Heidelberg until 1933, when the political unrest in Germany spurred his move to the Nutrition Laboratory at the University of Cambridge in England. He stayed as a researcher in there until 1935, during which time he discovered vitamin B_{6}.

In 1935, Gyorgy went to the United States as a visiting assistant professor of pediatrics at Case Western Reserve University. Two years later he was appointed as an associate professor at the university as well as an associate pediatrician at two hospitals within the University Hospitals of Cleveland system. He isolated biotin in 1940 while at Case Western Reserve University.

In 1944, Gyorgy moved to the University of Pennsylvania School of Medicine, this time as an Associate Research Professor of Pediatrics. His research at this time involved looking at the protective factors found in human breast milk. He was promoted to Professor of Pediatrics in 1946, later becoming a Professor Emeritus in 1963. From 1950 to 1957, he was also Pediatrician-in-Chief at the Hospital of the University of Pennsylvania and later on, Chief of Pediatrics at Philadelphia General Hospital from 1957 to 1963.

== Scientific research ==
Gyorgy was responsible for the discovery of three B vitamins, work he conducted with others during his time at Heidelberg, Cambridge, and Cleveland. Later in his career, Gyorgy investigated the protective factors found in human breast milk at the University of Pennsylvania.

=== Discovery of riboflavin ===
By 1927 a series of experiments, performed in part by Elmer McCollum and others, had shown that water-soluble vitamin B was primarily made of two parts: the anti-neuritic factor B_{1} (now known as thiamine) and the more heat-stable factor B_{2}. By 1932 Gyorgy had found that the heat-stable B_{2} was not in fact a single substance, but actually a complex made up of two factors: the growth-promoting factor (later found to be riboflavin) and the anti-pellagra factor (later found to be niacin (vitamin B_{3})). Gyorgy, in collaboration with chemist Richard Kuhn and physician Th. Wagner-Jauregg at the University of Heidelberg, had noticed that rats kept on a B_{2}-free diet were unable to gain weight. Isolation of concentrated B_{2} from yeast revealed the presence of a bright yellow-green fluorescent product that when fed to the rat, restored normal growth. The amount of growth restored was directly proportional to the intensity of the fluorescent product. The bright yellow substance had been previously found in milk by scientists Warburg and Christian, who had described the it as 'yellow oxidation ferment' but were unable to discover its function. Gyorgy, Kuhn, and Warner-Jauregg suggested the name 'flavin' for their yellow pigments and proposed that they were likely the same as the yellow pigments seen by Warberg and Christian.

By 1933, the Heidelberg team were the first to isolate crystalline flavin from milk and accordingly, termed the substance lactoflavin. They, along with other teams, went on to isolate similar flavins from many other sources such as egg white (ovoflavin) and liver (heptoflavin). All these compounds were found to be chemically identical and in 1937, the name riboflavin was formally adopted by the Council of Pharmacy and Chemistry of the American Medical Association.

=== Discovery of B_{6} ===
During his experiments with riboflavin, Gyorgy noticed that rats already on a thiamine-only diet developed pellagra-like symptoms, even when given pure riboflavin. The symptoms were only relieved when rats were given supplements derived from a flavin-free extract of bakers' yeast. In contrast, rats given this extract but no riboflavin failed to exhibit pellagra-like symptoms but were unable to gain weight until riboflavin was added back into the diet. These results confirmed the presence of an 'anti-pellagra' factor that was biologically distinct from the newly discovered riboflavin.

In 1934, Gyorgy named this new anti-pellagra factor B_{6} in order to distinguish it from other B vitamins and set about isolating and characterizing it during his time at the University of Cambridge. In 1936, Gyorgy and his colleague, Thomas William Birch, were successful in isolating crystalline B_{6} from fish and wheat germ.

=== Discovery of biotin ===
By 1927, scientists such as Margarete Boas and Helen Parsons had performed experiments demonstrating the symptoms associated with egg-white injury. They had found that rats fed large amounts of egg-white as their only protein source exhibited neurological dysfunction, dermatitis, and eventually, death. Gyorgy began investigating the factor responsible for egg-white injury in 1933 and in 1939, was successful identifying what he called vitamin H. Further chemical characterization of vitamin H revealed that it was water-soluble and present in high amounts in the liver. By this time, multiple groups had independently isolated the same compound under different names. In 1936, Kögl and Tönnis had isolated what they called biotin from egg yolk and in 1939, West had isolated what he called co-enzyme R. By 1940, it was recognized that all three compounds were identical and were collectively given the name biotin. Gyorgy continued his work on biotin and in 1941 published a paper demonstrating that egg-white injury was caused by the binding of biotin by avidin.

=== Protective factors in breast milk ===
In 1950, Gyorgy began investigating the microbial properties in human breast milk. He began by comparing the intestinal flora of normal breast-fed infants to those who were fed cow's milk formulas. He found that the breast-fed infants had a prevalence of a certain variant of Lactobacillus bifidus, a bacterium considered to be an essential part of normal human gut flora. Further testing revealed the presence of factors in human breast milk that acted as essential growth promoting factors to the L. bifidus variant.

In 1962, Gyorgy also discovered anti-staphylococcus properties of human breast milk. He injected mice with different doses of virulent Staphylococcus aureus and found that those given human breast milk obtained protection from infection, resulting in a higher survival rate than those that were given only cow's milk.

== Personal life ==
Gyorgy married Margaret John on October 23, 1920, in Weimar, Germany. The couple had three sons: Hans, who became an organic chemist, Michael, who became a physicist, and Tilbert, a surgeon. Gyorgy enjoyed classical music and was also an avid painter and gardener.

== Awards and honors ==
Gyorgy received the 1975 National Medal of Science from President Gerald Ford for his "discovery of three vitamins and related research that have greatly improved human nutrition". Gyorgy had already died by the time of the 1976 award ceremony and his medal was accepted by his wife, Margaret John. Other awards included:

- Borden Award of the American Institute of Nutrition (1951)
- Borden Award of Nutrition by the American Academy of Pediatrics (1952)
- Goldberger Award of the Council of Foods and Nutrition by the American Medical Association (1957)
- Osbourne-Mendel Award of the American Institute of Nutrition (1958)
- John Howland Award for the American Pediatric Society (1968)

== Later years and death ==
Gyorgy's later life revolved around his work in Southeast Asia, where he was involved in conducting nutritional field studies aimed at improving nutrition, particularly in Thailand and Indonesia. During this time, he was an organizer of the Protein Advisory Group of the World Health Organization and UNICEF, eventually becoming President of the group from 1960 to 1964. Gyorgy died on March 1, 1976, of pneumonia at Morristown Memorial Hospital in Morristown, New Jersey, at the age of 82.
