= Biocytin =

Names
- IUPAC name N^{6}-{5-[(3aS,4S,6aR)-2-Oxohexahydro-1H-thieno[3,4-d]imidazol-4-yl]pentanoyl}-L-lysine
- Systematic IUPAC name (2S)-2-Amino-6-{5-[(3aS,4S,6aR)-2-oxohexahydro-1H-thieno[3,4-d]imidazol-4-yl]pentanamido}hexanoic acid
- Other names Biotinyl-L-lysine; N_{ε}-(+)-Biotinyl-L-lysine

Identifiers
CAS Number	576-19-2
3D model (JSmol)	Interactive image
Abbreviations	Bct
ChEBI	CHEBI:27870
ChemSpider	75634
PubChem CID	7098660
UNII	G6D6147J22
CompTox Dashboard (EPA)	DTXSID30973172
- InChI: InChI=1S/C16H28N4O4S/c17-10(15(22)23)5-3-4-8-18-13(21)7-2-1-6-12-14-11(9-25-12)19-16(24)20-14/h10-12,14H,1-9,17H2,(H,18,21)(H,22,23)(H2,19,20,24)/t10-,11-,12-,14-/m0/s1 Key: BAQMYDQNMFBZNA-MNXVOIDGSA-N; InChI=1/C16H28N4O4S/c17-10(15(22)23)5-3-4-8-18-13(21)7-2-1-6-12-14-11(9-25-12)19-16(24)20-14/h10-12,14H,1-9,17H2,(H,18,21)(H,22,23)(H2,19,20,24)/t10-,11-,12-,14-/m0/s1 Key: BAQMYDQNMFBZNA-MNXVOIDGBH
- SMILES: O=C1N[C@@H]2[C@@H](SC[C@@H]2N1)CCCCC(=O)NCCCC[C@@H](C(=O)O)N

Properties
Chemical formula	C_{16}H_{28}N_{4}O_{4}S
Molar mass	372.48 g·mol^{−1}
Melting point	~245 °C
- Except where otherwise noted, data are given for materials in their standard state (at 25 °C [77 °F], 100 kPa). verify (what is ?) Infobox references

Biocytin is a chemical compound that is an amide formed from the vitamin biotin and the amino acid L-lysine. As an intermediate in the metabolism of biotin, biocytin occurs naturally in blood serum and urine.

The enzyme biotinidase cleaves biocytin and makes biotin available to be reused by other enzymes. Because biocytin is the natural substrate of the enzyme biotinidase, biocytin can be used to measure the biotinidase activity and therefore diagnose biotinidase deficiency.

Biocytin is also used in scientific research as a histological stain for nerve cells.
