= Biotin sulfoxide =

- Stereo, skeletal formula of biotin sulfoxide

Names
- Preferred IUPAC name 5-[(3aS,4S,6aR)-2,5-Dioxooctahydro-5λ^{4}-thieno[3,4-d]imidazol-4-yl]pentanoic acid
- Other names D-Biotin-d-sulfoxide

Identifiers
CAS Number	10406-89-0
3D model (JSmol)	Interactive image
ChEMBL	ChEMBL1231481
ChemSpider	75652
MeSH	D-Biotin-d-sulfoxide
PubChem CID	83833
UNII	71ET0LK93W
CompTox Dashboard (EPA)	DTXSID00908774
- InChI: InChI=1S/C10H16N2O4S/c13-8(14)4-2-1-3-7-9-6(5-17(7)16)11-10(15)12-9/h6-7,9H,1-5H2,(H,13,14)(H2,11,12,15)/t6-,7-,9-,17?/m0/s1 Key: KCSKCIQYNAOBNQ-YBSFLMRUSA-N
- SMILES: C1[C@H]2[C@@H]([C@@H](S1=O)CCCCC(=O)O)NC(=O)N2

Properties
Chemical formula	C_{10}H_{16}N_{2}O_{4}S
Molar mass	260.31 g·mol^{−1}
log P	−2.026
Acidity (pK_{a})	4.724
Basicity (pK_{b})	9.273
- Except where otherwise noted, data are given for materials in their standard state (at 25 °C [77 °F], 100 kPa). verify (what is ?) Infobox references

Biotin sulfoxide is the substance that is formed when biotin is exposed to certain oxidants, including ultraviolet light in the presence of oxygen.
