= Biotin—(methylmalonyl-CoA-carboxytransferase) ligase =

Class of enzymes

Biotin—[methylmalonyl-CoA-carboxytransferase] ligase

Identifiers
- EC no.: 6.3.4.9
- CAS no.: 37318-66-4

Databases
- BRENDA: enzyme data
- ExPASy: NiceZyme view
- KEGG: enzyme entry
- MetaCyc: metabolic pathway
- Rhea: reactions
- PDB structures: RCSB PDB PDBe PDBsum
- Gene Ontology: AmiGO / QuickGO
Search
- PMC: articles
- PubMed: articles
- NCBI: proteins

In enzymology, a biotin—[methylmalonyl-CoA-carboxytransferase] ligase (EC 6.3.4.9) is an enzyme that catalyzes the chemical reaction

ATP + biotin + apo-[methylmalonyl-CoA:pyruvate carboxytransferase] $\rightleftharpoons$ AMP + diphosphate + [methylmalonyl-CoA:pyruvate carboxytransferase]

The 3 substrates of this enzyme are ATP, biotin, and [[apo-[methylmalonyl-CoA:pyruvate carboxytransferase]]], whereas its 3 products are AMP, diphosphate, and methylmalonyl-CoA:pyruvate carboxytransferase.

This enzyme belongs to the family of ligases, specifically those forming generic carbon-nitrogen bonds. The systematic name of this enzyme class is biotin:apo[methylmalonyl-CoA:pyruvate carboxytransferase] ligase (AMP-forming). This enzyme participates in biotin metabolism.
