= VNN2 =

Protein-coding gene in the species Homo sapiens

Identifiers
- Aliases: VNN2, FOAP-4, GPI-80, vanin 2
- External IDs: OMIM: 603571; GeneCards: VNN2
Enzyme activity
EC #	BRENDA	ExPASy	KEGG	MetaCyc
3.5.1.92	↗	↗	↗	↗

Gene location (Human)
Chr.	Chromosome 6 (human)
Band	6q23.2	Start	132,743,870 bp
Band	6q23.2	End	132,763,459 bp
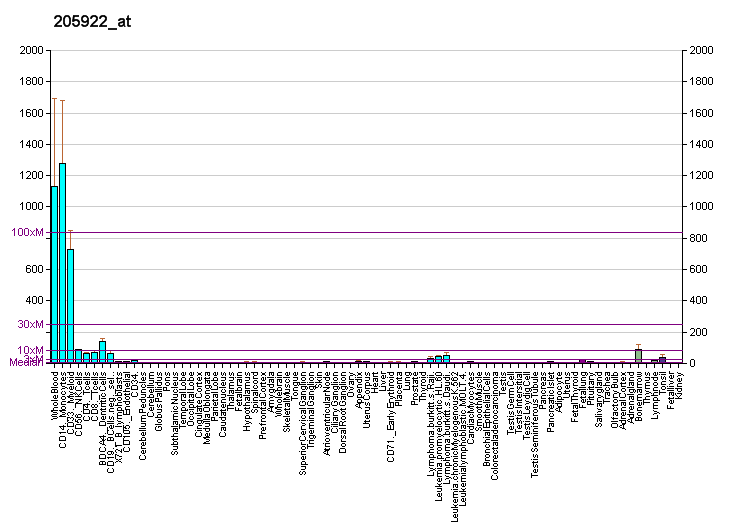
RNA expression pattern
Bgee	Human / Mouse (ortholog); Top expressed in: blood; monocyte; granulocyte; palpebral conjunctiva; periodontal fiber; trabecular bone; right lung; spleen; bone marrow; gallbladder / n/a; More reference expression data
BioGPS	More reference expression data
Gene ontology
Molecular function	hydrolase activity, acting on carbon-nitrogen (but not peptide) bonds, in linear amides; hydrolase activity; pantetheine hydrolase activity
Cellular component	anchored component of membrane; membrane; extracellular region; plasma membrane
Biological process	nitrogen compound metabolic process; pantothenate metabolic process
Sources:Amigo / QuickGO
Orthologs
Databases	NCBI: entry; OMA: entry
Species	Human	Mouse
Entrez	8875	n/a
Ensembl	ENSG00000112303	n/a
UniProt	O95498	n/a
RefSeq (mRNA)	NM_001242350; NM_004665; NM_078488	n/a
RefSeq (protein)	NP_001229279; NP_004656; NP_511043	n/a
Location (UCSC)	Chr 6: 132.74 – 132.76 Mb	n/a
PubMed search		n/a
- Wikidata
View/Edit Human

Vascular non-inflammatory molecule 2 is a protein that in humans is encoded by the VNN2 gene.

This gene product is a member of the Vanin family of proteins which share extensive sequence similarity with each other, and also with biotinidase. The family includes secreted and membrane-associated proteins, a few of which have been reported to participate in hematopoietic cell trafficking. No biotinidase activity has been demonstrated for any of the vanin proteins, however, they possess pantetheinase activity, which may play a role in oxidative-stress response.

The encoded protein is a GPI-anchored cell surface molecule that plays a role in transendothelial migration of neutrophils. This gene lies in close proximity to, and in same transcriptional orientation as two other vanin genes on chromosome 6q23-q24. Two transcript variants encoding different isoforms have been described for this gene.
