= VNN1 =

Protein-coding gene in the species Homo sapiens

Identifiers
- Aliases: VNN1, HDLCQ8, Tiff66, vanin 1
- External IDs: MGI: 108395; GeneCards: VNN1
Available structures
PDB	Ortholog search: PDBe RCSB
PDB	List of PDB id codes 4CYF, 4CYG, 4CYY
Enzyme activity
EC #	BRENDA	ExPASy	KEGG	MetaCyc
3.5.1.92	↗	↗	↗	↗

Gene location (Human)
Chr.	Chromosome 6 (human)
Band	6q23.2	Start	132,680,849 bp
Band	6q23.2	End	132,714,055 bp

Gene location (Mouse)
Chr.	Chromosome 10 (mouse)
Band	10|10 A4	Start	23,770,586 bp
Band	10|10 A4	End	23,781,241 bp
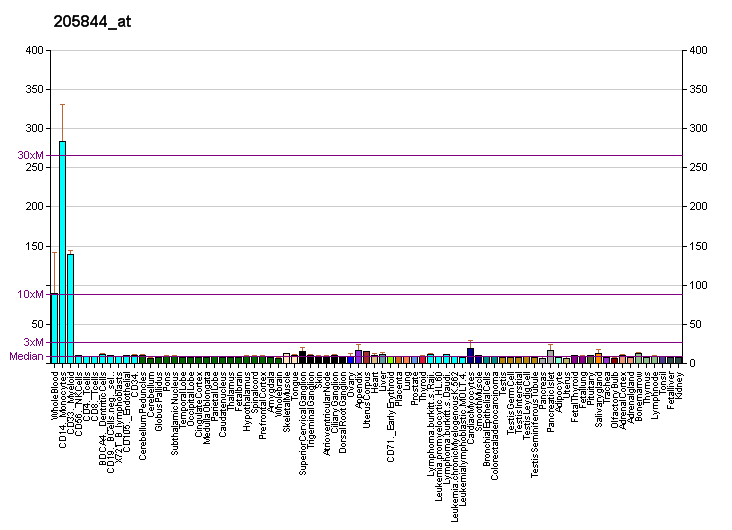
RNA expression pattern
Bgee	Human / Mouse (ortholog); Top expressed in: jejunal mucosa; duodenum; gallbladder; liver; right lobe of liver; pancreatic epithelial cell; kidney tubule; blood; pancreatic ductal cell; mucosa of ileum / Top expressed in: jejunum; proximal tubule; intestinal villus; left lung lobe; right kidney; renal corpuscle; human kidney; left lobe of liver; Ileal epithelium; parotid gland; More reference expression data
BioGPS	More reference expression data
Gene ontology
Molecular function	hydrolase activity, acting on carbon-nitrogen (but not peptide) bonds, in linear amides; hydrolase activity; pantetheine hydrolase activity
Cellular component	integral component of membrane; membrane; anchored component of membrane; extracellular region; plasma membrane; azurophil granule membrane
Biological process	positive regulation of T cell differentiation in thymus; response to oxidative stress; nitrogen compound metabolic process; acute inflammatory response; negative regulation of oxidative stress-induced intrinsic apoptotic signaling pathway; innate immune response; inflammatory response; chronic inflammatory response; pantothenate metabolic process; neutrophil degranulation; cell-cell adhesion
Sources:Amigo / QuickGO
Orthologs
Databases	NCBI: entry; OMA: entry
Species	Human	Mouse
Entrez	8876	22361
Ensembl	ENSG00000112299	ENSMUSG00000037440
UniProt	O95497	Q9Z0K8
RefSeq (mRNA)	NM_004666	NM_011704
RefSeq (protein)	NP_004657	NP_035834
Location (UCSC)	Chr 6: 132.68 – 132.71 Mb	Chr 10: 23.77 – 23.78 Mb
PubMed search
- Wikidata
View/Edit Human	View/Edit Mouse

Pantetheinase is an enzyme that in humans is encoded by the VNN1 gene.

This gene product is a member of the Vanin family of proteins which share extensive sequence similarity with each other, and also with biotinidase. The family includes secreted and membrane-associated proteins, a few of which have been reported to participate in hematopoietic cell trafficking. No biotinidase activity has been demonstrated for any of the vanin proteins, however, they possess pantetheinase activity, which may play a role in oxidative-stress response. This protein, like its mouse homolog, is likely a GPI-anchored cell surface molecule. The mouse protein is expressed by the perivascular thymic stromal cells and regulates migration of T-cell progenitors to the thymus. This gene lies in close proximity to, and in same transcriptional orientation as two other vanin genes on chromosome 6q23-q24.
