= Multiple carboxylase deficiency =

Metabolic disorders involving failures of carboxylation enzymes

- Specialty: Medical genetics, endocrinology

Multiple carboxylase deficiency is a form of metabolic disorder involving failures of carboxylation enzymes.

The deficiency can be in biotinidase or holocarboxylase synthetase.

These conditions respond to biotin.

== Types ==
Forms include:

- Holocarboxylase synthetase deficiency - neonatal;
- Biotinidase deficiency - late onset;

If left untreated, the symptoms can include feeding problems, decreased body tone, generalized red rash with skin exfoliation and baldness, failure to thrive, seizure, coma, developmental delay, foul smelling urine, lactic acidosis, and high levels of ketones and ammonia in the blood.
