= Biotin—(methylcrotonoyl-CoA-carboxylase) ligase =

Class of enzymes

biotin-[methylcrotonoyl-CoA-carboxylase] ligase

Identifiers
- EC no.: 6.3.4.11
- CAS no.: 37318-68-6

Databases
- BRENDA: enzyme data
- ExPASy: NiceZyme view
- KEGG: enzyme entry
- MetaCyc: metabolic pathway
- Rhea: reactions
- PDB structures: RCSB PDB PDBe PDBsum
- Gene Ontology: AmiGO / QuickGO
Search
- PMC: articles
- PubMed: articles
- NCBI: proteins

In enzymology, a biotin-[methylcrotonoyl-CoA-carboxylase] ligase (EC 6.3.4.11) is an enzyme that catalyzes the chemical reaction

ATP + biotin + apo-[3-methylcrotonoyl-CoA:carbon-dioxide ligase (ADP-forming)] $\rightleftharpoons$ AMP + diphosphate + [3-methylcrotonoyl-CoA:carbon-dioxide ligase (ADP-forming)]

The 3 substrates of this enzyme are ATP, biotin, and [[apo-[3-methylcrotonoyl-CoA:carbon-dioxide ligase (ADP-forming)]]], whereas its 3 products are AMP, diphosphate, and 3-methylcrotonoyl-CoA:carbon-dioxide ligase (ADP-forming).

This enzyme belongs to the family of ligases, specifically those forming generic carbon-nitrogen bonds. The systematic name of this enzyme class is biotin:apo-[3-methylcrotonoyl-CoA:carbon-dioxide ligase (ADP-forming)] ligase (AMP-forming). Other names in common use include biotin-[methylcrotonoyl-CoA-carboxylase] synthetase, biotin-beta-methylcrotonyl coenzyme A carboxylase synthetase, beta-methylcrotonyl coenzyme A holocarboxylase synthetase, and holocarboxylase-synthetase. This enzyme participates in biotin metabolism.
