= Methylmalonyl-CoA carboxytransferase =

Class of enzymes

methylmalonyl-CoA carboxytransferase
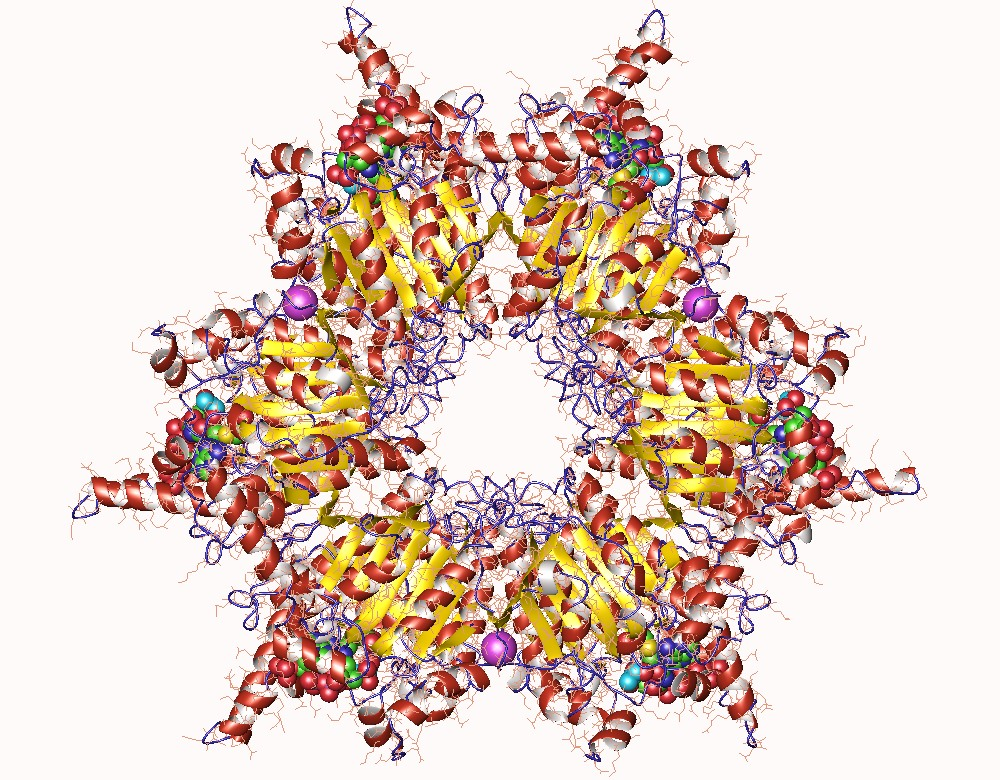
- Methylmalonyl-CoA carboxytransferase homohexamer, Propionibacterium

Identifiers
- EC no.: 2.1.3.1
- CAS no.: 9029-86-1

Databases
- IntEnz: IntEnz view
- BRENDA: BRENDA entry
- ExPASy: NiceZyme view
- KEGG: KEGG entry
- MetaCyc: metabolic pathway
- PRIAM: profile
- PDB structures: RCSB PDB PDBe PDBsum
- Gene Ontology: AmiGO / QuickGO
Search
- PMC: articles
- PubMed: articles
- NCBI: proteins

In enzymology, a methylmalonyl-CoA carboxytransferase (EC 2.1.3.1) is an enzyme that catalyzes the chemical reaction

pyruvic acid
+
(S)-methylmalonyl-CoA
oxaloacetic acid
+
propionyl-CoA

The enzyme can convert pyruvate to oxaloacetate, using (S)-methylmalonyl-CoA as its cofactor.

This enzyme belongs to the family of transferases that transfer one-carbon groups, specifically the carboxy- and carbamoyltransferases. The systematic name of this enzyme class is (S)-methylmalonyl-CoA:pyruvate carboxytransferase. Other names in common use include transcarboxylase, methylmalonyl coenzyme A carboxyltransferase, methylmalonyl-CoA transcarboxylase, oxalacetic transcarboxylase, methylmalonyl-CoA carboxyltransferase, methylmalonyl-CoA carboxyltransferase, (S)-2-methyl-3-oxopropanoyl-CoA:pyruvate carboxyltransferase, (S)-2-methyl-3-oxopropanoyl-CoA:pyruvate carboxytransferase, and carboxytransferase [incorrect]. This enzyme participates in propanoate metabolism. It has 3 cofactors: zinc, Biotin, and Cobalt.

== Structural studies ==
As of late 2007, 12 structures have been solved for this class of enzymes, with PDB accession codes 1DCZ, 1DD2, 1ON3, 1ON9, 1RQB, 1RQE, 1RQH, 1RR2, 1S3H, 1U5J, 2D5D, and 2EVB.
