= Photobiotin =

Names
- IUPAC name N-{3-[{3-[(4-Azido-2-nitrophenyl)amino]propyl}(methyl)amino]propyl}-5-[(3aS,6aR)-2-oxohexahydro-1H-thieno[3,4-d]imidazol-4-yl]pentanamide
- Other names Photoprobe biotin, Photoactivatable biotin

Identifiers
CAS Number	96087-37-5
3D model (JSmol)	Interactive image
ChemSpider	2299671
PubChem CID	3035428
UNII	53LXX17EV4
CompTox Dashboard (EPA)	DTXSID80903944
- InChI: InChI=1S/C23H35N9O4S/c1-31(12-4-10-25-17-9-8-16(29-30-24)14-19(17)32(35)36)13-5-11-26-21(33)7-3-2-6-20-22-18(15-37-20)27-23(34)28-22/h8-9,14,18,20,22,25H,2-7,10-13,15H2,1H3,(H,26,33)(H2,27,28,34)/t18-,20?,22-/m0/s1 Key: BRLRJZRHRJEWJY-JERZPMBSSA-N; InChI=1S/C23H35N9O4S/c1-31(12-4-10-25-17-9-8-16(29-30-24)14-19(17)32(35)36)13-5-11-26-21(33)7-3-2-6-20-22-18(15-37-20)27-23(34)28-22/h8-9,14,18,20,22,25H,2-7,10-13,15H2,1H3,(H,26,33)(H2,27,28,34)/t18-,20?,22-/m0/s1
- SMILES: O=C1N[C@@H]2C(SC[C@@H]2N1)CCCCC(=O)NCCCN(CCCNc3ccc(\N=[N+]=[N-])cc3[N+]([O-])=O)C

Properties
Chemical formula	C_{23}H_{35}N_{9}O_{4}S
Molar mass	533.65 g·mol^{−1}
Appearance	Orange to red powder
- Except where otherwise noted, data are given for materials in their standard state (at 25 °C [77 °F], 100 kPa). verify (what is ?) Infobox references

Photobiotin is a derivative of biotin used as a biochemical tool. It is composed of a biotin group, a linker group, and a photoactivatable aryl azide group.

The photoactivatable group provides nonspecific labeling of proteins, DNA and RNA probes or other molecules. Biotinylation of DNA and RNA with photoactivatable biotin is easier and less expensive than enzymatic methods since the DNA and RNA does not degrade. Photobiotin is most effectively activated by light at 260-475 nm.
