= Holocarboxylase synthetase deficiency =

Metabolic disorder; inability to use biotin

- Other names: Early-onset multiple carboxylase deficiency
- Biotin
- Specialty: Medical genetics, endocrinology

Holocarboxylase synthetase deficiency is an inherited metabolic disorder in which the body cannot use biotin – a B vitamin – effectively. This disorder is classified as a multiple carboxylase deficiency, characterized by impaired activity of certain enzymes that depend on biotin. Symptoms are very similar to biotinidase deficiency, and treatment – large doses of biotin – is also the same.

== Genetics ==
Holocarboxylase synthetase deficiency has an autosomal recessive pattern of inheritance.

Mutations in the HLCS gene cause holocarboxylase synthetase deficiency. The HLCS gene makes holocarboxylase synthetase, an enzyme that attaches biotin to other molecules. Biotin, a B vitamin, is found in foods such as liver, egg yolks, and milk. It is essential for the normal production and breakdown of proteins, fats, and carbohydrates in the body. Mutations in the HLCS gene reduce the activity of holocarboxylase synthetase, preventing cells from using biotin effectively and disrupting many cellular functions.

This condition is inherited in an autosomal recessive pattern, which means two copies of the gene in each cell are altered.

== Diagnosis ==
The signs and symptoms of holocarboxylase synthetase deficiency typically appear within the first few months of life, but the age of onset varies. Affected infants often have immunodeficiency diseases, difficulty feeding, breathing problems, a skin rash, hair loss (alopecia), and a lack of energy (lethargy). Immediate treatment and lifelong management (using biotin supplements) may prevent many of these complications. If left untreated, the disorder can lead to delayed development, seizures, and coma. These medical problems may be life-threatening in some cases.

== See also ==
- List of cutaneous conditions
