= Biotinidase =

Enzyme found in humans

BTD

Identifiers
- Aliases: BTD, biotinidase
- External IDs: OMIM: 609019; MGI: 1347001; GeneCards: BTD
Enzyme activity
EC #	BRENDA	ExPASy	KEGG	MetaCyc
3.5.1.12	↗	↗	↗	↗

Gene location (Human)
Chr.	Chromosome 3 (human)
Band	3p25.1	Start	15,601,341 bp
Band	3p25.1	End	15,722,311 bp

Gene location (Mouse)
Chr.	Chromosome 14 (mouse)
Band	14|14 B	Start	31,362,985 bp
Band	14|14 B	End	31,390,536 bp
RNA expression pattern
Bgee	Human / Mouse (ortholog); Top expressed in: islet of Langerhans; right lobe of liver; duodenum; jejunal mucosa; gallbladder; stromal cell of endometrium; body of pancreas; right adrenal gland; left adrenal gland; right adrenal cortex / Top expressed in: proximal tubule; genital tubercle; right kidney; tail of embryo; human kidney; choroid plexus of fourth ventricle; liver; brown adipose tissue; left lobe of liver; internal carotid artery; More reference expression data
BioGPS	n/a
Gene ontology
Molecular function	hydrolase activity, acting on carbon-nitrogen (but not peptide) bonds, in linear amides; hydrolase activity; hydrolase activity, acting on carbon-nitrogen (but not peptide) bonds; biotinidase activity
Cellular component	extracellular region; mitochondrial matrix; extracellular exosome; extracellular space
Biological process	central nervous system development; nitrogen compound metabolic process; biotin metabolic process
Sources:Amigo / QuickGO
Orthologs
Databases	NCBI: entry; OMA: entry
Species	Human	Mouse
Entrez	686	26363
Ensembl	ENSG00000169814	ENSMUSG00000021900
UniProt	P43251	Q8CIF4
RefSeq (mRNA)	NM_001281723; NM_001281724; NM_001281725; NM_001281726; NM_001323582 NM_001370658; NM_001370752; NM_001370753	NM_025295; NM_001374217
RefSeq (protein)	NP_000051; NP_001268652; NP_001268653; NP_001268654; NP_001268655 NP_001310511	NP_079571; NP_001361146
Location (UCSC)	Chr 3: 15.6 – 15.72 Mb	Chr 14: 31.36 – 31.39 Mb
PubMed search
- Wikidata
View/Edit Human	View/Edit Mouse

Biotinidase (EC 3.5.1.12, amidohydrolase biotinidase, BTD), also known as biotinase, is an enzyme that in humans is encoded by the BTD gene.

The enzyme breaks down biotin amides, releasing free biotin and the amine. The main substrate is biocytin, or biotin linked to lysine. It is also capable of breaking apart biotin esters.

== Function ==
This enzyme allows the body to use and recycle the B vitamin biotin, sometimes called vitamin H. Biotinidase extracts biotin from food because the body needs biotin in its free, unattached form. This enzyme also recycles biotin from enzymes in the body that utilize it as a coenzyme to function. These enzymes, known as carboxylases, are important in the processing of fats, carbohydrates, and proteins. Biotin is attached to these carboxylase enzymes through an amino acid (the building material of proteins) called lysine, forming a complex called biocytin. Biotinidase removes biotin from biocytin, making it available for reuse by other enzymes:

biocytin
H_{2}O
biotin
+
L-lysine

== Clinical significance ==
Biotin, sometimes called vitamin H, is an important water-soluble vitamin that aids in the metabolism of fats, carbohydrates, and proteins. The human body cannot produce biotin, but it can obtain it from the diet, internal recycling, and to some extent from intestinal bacteria. Biotin deficiency can result in behavioral disorders, lack of coordination, learning disabilities, and seizures.

Unlike most vitamins, which are noncovalently bound to enzymes, biotin is chemically linked (covalently bound), and therefore cannot be easily removed from the enzyme denaturation. Without biotinidase activity, the vitamin biotin cannot be separated from foods and therefore cannot be used by the body. Biotinidase deficiency is an inherited disorder caused by mutations in the BTD gene. When biotinidase activity is deficient, biotin can be neither recycled within the body nor removed from ingested food. Nor can biotin be recycled from enzymes to which it is bound. Deficient biotinidase activity causes specific metabolic enzymes, called carboxylases, to be nonfunctional, inhibiting the proper processing of proteins, fats, and carbohydrates. Individuals lacking biotinidase activity can still have normal carboxylases if they ingest small amounts of biotin. Approximately 1 in 60,000 newborns are affected by profound (less than 10 percent of normal enzyme activity) or partial (10-30 percent of normal enzyme activity) biotinidase deficiency.

== Genetics ==
The BTD gene is located on the short (p) arm of chromosome 3 at position 25, from base pair 15,618,326 to base pair 15,662,328. Mutations in the BTD gene cause biotinidase deficiency. Approximately 100 mutations in the BTD gene that lead to biotinidase deficiency have been discovered. These mutations either prevent the enzyme from being made or cause the enzyme that is produced to be nonfunctional.

This condition is inherited in an autosomal recessive pattern, which means two copies of the gene in each cell must be altered for a person to be affected by the disorder. Most often, the parents of a child with an autosomal recessive disorder are not affected but are carriers of one copy of the altered gene.

== Disease database ==
BTD gene variant database
