= Biotin =

Vitamin

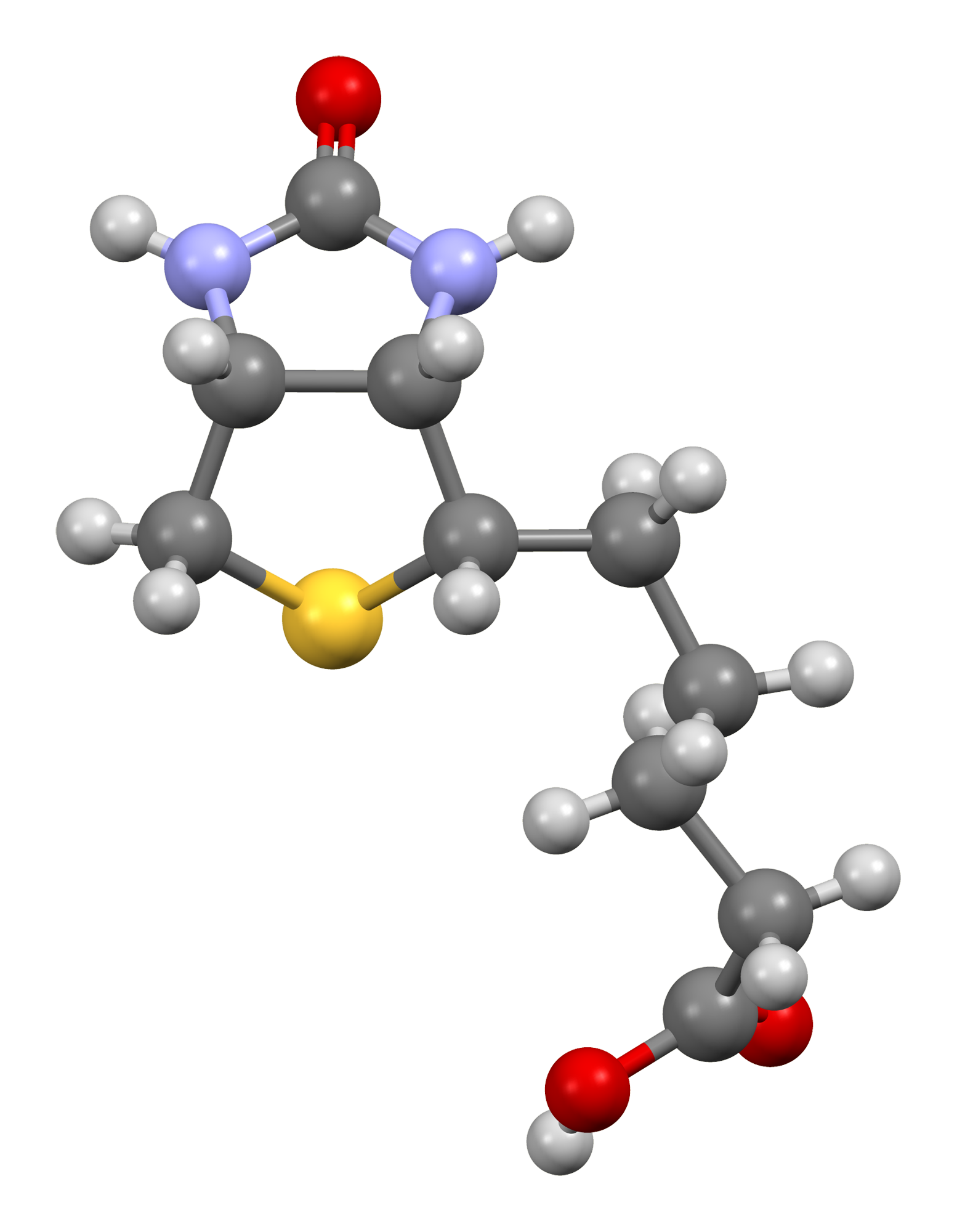

Names
- Preferred IUPAC name 5-[(3aS,4S,6aR)-2-Oxohexahydro-1H-thieno[3,4-d]imidazol-4-yl]pentanoic acid
- Other names Vitamin B_{7}

Identifiers
CAS Number	58-85-5
3D model (JSmol)	Interactive image; Interactive image
ChEBI	CHEBI:15956
ChEMBL	ChEMBL857
ChemSpider	149962
DrugBank	DB00121
ECHA InfoCard	100.000.363
IUPHAR/BPS	4787
KEGG	D00029
PubChem CID	171548
UNII	6SO6U10H04
CompTox Dashboard (EPA)	DTXSID7022679
- InChI: InChI=1S/C10H16N2O3S/c13-8(14)4-2-1-3-7-9-6(5-16-7)11-10(15)12-9/h6-7,9H,1-5H2,(H,13,14)(H2,11,12,15)/t6-,7-,9-/m0/s1 Key: YBJHBAHKTGYVGT-ZKWXMUAHSA-N; InChI=1/C10H16N2O3S/c13-8(14)4-2-1-3-7-9-6(5-16-7)11-10(15)12-9/h6-7,9H,1-5H2,(H,13,14)(H2,11,12,15)/t6-,7-,9-/m0/s1 Key: YBJHBAHKTGYVGT-ZKWXMUAHBB
- SMILES: O=C1N[C@@H]2[C@@H](SC[C@@H]2N1)CCCCC(=O)O; C1[C@H]2[C@@H]([C@@H](S1)CCCCC(=O)O)NC(=O)N2

Properties
Chemical formula	C_{10}H_{16}N_{2}O_{3}S
Molar mass	244.31 g·mol^{−1}
Appearance	White crystalline needles
Melting point	232 to 233 °C (450 to 451 °F; 505 to 506 K)
Solubility in water	22 mg/100 mL

Pharmacology
ATC code	A11HA05 (WHO)

Hazards
NFPA 704 (fire diamond)	1 1 0
- Except where otherwise noted, data are given for materials in their standard state (at 25 °C [77 °F], 100 kPa). verify (what is ?) Infobox references

3D space-filling model of biotin rotating about an axis

Biotin (also known as vitamin B_{7} and vitamin H) is one of the B vitamins – a group of essential dietary micronutrients. Present in every living cell, it is involved as a cofactor for enzymes in numerous metabolic processes, both in humans and in other organisms, primarily related to the biochemistry of fats, carbohydrates, and amino acids.

When isolated, biotin is a white, needle-like crystalline solid. Biotin is obtained from foods, particularly meats and liver, and is sold as a dietary supplement.

The name biotin, borrowed from the German Biotin, derives from the Ancient Greek word βίοτος (bíotos; 'life') and the suffix "-in" (a suffix used in chemistry usually to indicate 'forming').

== Chemical description ==
Biotin is classified as a heterocyclic compound, with a sulfur-containing tetrahydrothiophene ring fused to a ureido group. A C5-carboxylic acid side chain is appended to the former ring. The ureido ring, containing the −N−CO−N− group, serves as the carbon dioxide carrier in carboxylation reactions. Biotin is a coenzyme for five carboxylase enzymes, which are involved in the catabolism of amino acids and fatty acids, synthesis of fatty acids, and gluconeogenesis. Biotinylation of histone proteins in nuclear chromatin plays a role in chromatin stability and gene expression.

== Dietary recommendations ==
The US National Academy of Medicine updated Dietary Reference Intakes for many vitamins in 1998. At that time there was insufficient information to establish estimated average requirement or recommended dietary allowance, terms that exist for most vitamins. In those cases the academy set adequate intakes (AIs) with the understanding that at some later date, when the physiological effects of biotin are better understood, AIs will be replaced by more exact information. The biotin AIs for both males and females appear below.

Biotin adequate intakes (AIs)
Age group	Biotin AI (μg/day)
0 to 6 months	5
7 to 12 months	6
1 to 3 years	8
4 to 8 years	12
9 to 13 years	20
14 to 18 years	25
19 years and older	30
Pregnant females (14 to 50 years)	30
Lactating females (14 to 50 years)	35

Australia and New Zealand set AIs similar to the US.

The European Food Safety Authority (EFSA) also identifies AIs, setting values at 40 μg/day for adults, pregnancy at 40 μg/day, and breastfeeding at 45 μg/day. For children ages 1–17 years, the AIs increase with age from 20 to 35 μg/day.

=== Safety ===
The US National Academy of Medicine estimates upper limits for vitamins and minerals when evidence for a true limit is sufficient. For biotin, however, there is no upper limit because the adverse effects of high biotin intake have not been determined. The EFSA also reviewed safety and reached the same conclusion as in the United States.

=== Labeling regulations ===
For US food and dietary supplement labeling purposes, the amount in a serving is expressed as a percent of daily value. For biotin labeling purposes, 100% of the daily value was 300 μg/day, but as of May 27, 2016, it was revised to 30 μg/day to agree with the adequate intake. Compliance with the updated labeling regulations was required by January 1, 2020, for manufacturers with US$10 million or more in annual food sales, and by January 1, 2021, for manufacturers with lower volume food sales.

Source	Amount (μg)
Beef liver, 3 oz.	31
Egg, 1 whole	10
Salmon, 3 oz.	5
Pork chop, 3 oz.	4
Hamburger patty, 3 oz.	4
Sunflower seeds, 1/4 cup	3
Sweet potato, 1/2 cup	2

== Food sources ==
Biotin is stable at room temperature and is not destroyed by cooking. The dietary biotin intake in Western populations is in the range of 40 to 60 μg/day. Nursing infants require about 5 μg/day. Biotin is available in dietary supplements, individually or as an ingredient in multivitamins.

According to the Global Fortification Data Exchange, biotin deficiency is so rare that no countries require foods to be fortified.

== Physiology ==
Biotin is a water-soluble B vitamin. Consumption of large amounts as a dietary supplement results in absorption, followed by excretion into urine as biotin. Consumption of biotin as part of a normal diet results in urinary excretion of biotin and biotin metabolites.

=== Absorption ===
Biotin in food is bound to proteins. Digestive enzymes break down the proteins to biotin-bound peptides. The intestinal enzyme biotinidase, found in pancreatic secretions and in the brush border membranes of all three parts of the small intestine, frees biotin, which is then absorbed from the small intestine. When consumed as a biotin dietary supplement, absorption is nonsaturable, meaning that even very high amounts are absorbed effectively. Transport across the jejunum is faster than across the ileum.

The large intestine microbiota synthesizes amounts of biotin estimated to be similar to the amount taken in the diet, and a significant portion of this biotin exists in the free (protein-unbound) form and, thus, is available for absorption. How much is absorbed in humans is unknown, although a review did report that human colon epithelial cells in vitro demonstrated an ability to uptake biotin.

Once absorbed, sodium-dependent multivitamin transporter (SMVT) mediates biotin uptake into the liver. SMVT also binds pantothenic acid, so high intakes of either of these vitamins can interfere with the transport of the other.

=== Metabolism and excretion ===
Biotin catabolism occurs via two pathways. In one, the valeric acid sidechain is cleaved, resulting in bisnorbiotin. In the other path, the sulfur is oxidized, resulting in biotin sulfoxide. Urine content is proportionally about half biotin, plus bisnorbiotin, biotin sulfoxide, and small amounts of other metabolites.

=== Factors that affect biotin requirements ===
Chronic alcohol use is associated with a significant reduction in plasma biotin. Intestinal biotin uptake also appears to be sensitive to the effect of the anti-epilepsy drugs carbamazepine and primidone. Relatively low levels of biotin have also been reported in the urine or plasma of patients who have had a partial gastrectomy or have other causes of achlorhydria, as well as burn patients, elderly individuals, and athletes. Pregnancy and lactation may be associated with an increased demand for biotin. In pregnancy, this may be due to a possible acceleration of biotin catabolism, whereas, in lactation, the cause of the higher demand is unknown. Recent studies have shown marginal biotin deficiency can be present in human gestation, as evidenced by increased urinary excretion of 3-hydroxyisovaleric acid, decreased urinary excretion of biotin and bisnorbiotin, and decreased plasma concentration of biotin.

== Biosynthesis in non-mammals ==
Biotin, synthesized in plants, is essential to plant growth and development. Bacteria also synthesize biotin, and it is thought that bacteria resident in the large intestine may synthesize biotin that is absorbed and utilized by the host organism.

Biosynthesis starts from two precursors, alanine and pimeloyl-CoA. These form 7-keto-8-aminopelargonic acid (KAPA). KAPA is transported from plant peroxisomes to mitochondria where it is converted to 7,8-diaminopelargonic acid (DAPA) with the help of the enzyme, BioA. The enzyme dethiobiotin synthetase catalyzes the formation of the ureido ring via a DAPA carbamate activated with ATP, creating dethiobiotin with the help of the enzyme, BioD, which is then converted into biotin which is catalyzed by BioB. The last step is catalyzed by biotin synthase, a radical SAM enzyme. The sulfur is donated by an unusual [2Fe-2S] ferredoxin. Depending on the species of bacteria, biotin can be synthesized via multiple pathways.

== Cofactor biochemistry ==
The enzyme holocarboxylase synthetase covalently attaches biotin to five human carboxylase enzymes:

- Acetyl-CoA carboxylase alpha (ACC1)
- Acetyl-CoA carboxylase beta (ACC2)
- Pyruvate carboxylase (PC)
- Methylcrotonyl-CoA carboxylase (MCC)
- Propionyl-CoA carboxylase (PCC)

For the first two, biotin serves as a cofactor responsible for the transfer of bicarbonate to acetyl-CoA, converting it to malonyl-CoA for fatty acid synthesis. PC participates in gluconeogenesis. MCC catalyzes a step in leucine metabolism. PCC catalyzes a step in the metabolism of propionyl-CoA. Metabolic degradation of the biotinylated carboxylases leads to the formation of biocytin. This compound is further degraded by biotinidase to release biotin, which is then reutilized by holocarboxylase synthetase.

Biotinylation of histone proteins in nuclear chromatin is a posttranslational modification that plays a role in chromatin stability and gene expression.

== Deficiency ==
Primary biotin deficiency, meaning deficiency due to too little biotin in the diet, is rare because biotin is contained in many foods. Subclinical deficiency can cause mild symptoms, such as hair thinning, brittle fingernails, or skin rash, typically on the face.

Aside from inadequate dietary intake (rare), biotin deficiency can be caused by a genetic disorder that affects biotin metabolism. The most common among these is biotinidase deficiency. Low activity of this enzyme causes a failure to recycle biotin from biocytin. Rarer are carboxylase and biotin transporter deficiencies. Neonatal screening for biotinidase deficiency started in the United States in 1984, with many countries now also testing for this genetic disorder at birth. Treatment is a lifelong dietary supplement with biotin. If biotinidase deficiency goes untreated, it can be fatal.

=== Diagnosis ===
Low serum and urine biotin are not sensitive indicators of inadequate biotin intake. However, serum testing can be useful for confirmation of consumption of biotin-containing dietary supplements, and whether a period of refraining from supplement use is long enough to eliminate the potential for interfering with drug tests. Indirect measures depend on the biotin requirement for carboxylases. 3-Methylcrotonyl-CoA is an intermediate step in the catabolism of the amino acid leucine. Without biotin, the pathway diverts to 3-hydroxyisovaleric acid. Urinary excretion of this compound is an early and sensitive indicator of biotin deficiency.

=== Deficiency as a result of metabolic disorders ===
Biotinidase deficiency is a deficiency of the enzyme that recycles biotin, due to an inherited genetic mutation. Biotinidase catalyzes the cleavage of biotin from biocytin and biotinyl-peptides (the proteolytic degradation products of each holocarboxylase) and thereby recycles biotin. It is also important in freeing biotin from dietary protein-bound biotin. Neonatal screening for biotinidase deficiency started in the United States in 1984, which as of 2017 was reported as required in more than 30 countries.

Profound biotinidase deficiency, defined as less than 10% of normal serum enzyme activity, which has been reported as 7.1 nmol/min/mL, has an incidence of 1 in 40,000 to 1 in 60,000, but with rates as high as 1 in 10,000 in countries with high incidence of consanguineous marriages (second cousin or closer). Partial biotinidase deficiency is defined as 10% to 30% of normal serum activity. Incidence data stems from government-mandated newborn screening. For profound deficiency, treatment is oral dosing with 5 to 20 mg per day. Seizures are reported as resolving in hours to days, with other symptoms resolving within weeks. Treatment of partial biotinidase deficiency is also recommended even though some untreated people never manifest symptoms. Lifelong treatment with supplemental biotin is recommended for both profound and partial biotinidase deficiency.

Inherited metabolic disorders characterized by deficient activities of biotin-dependent carboxylases are termed multiple carboxylase deficiency. These include deficiencies in the enzymes holocarboxylase synthetase. Holocarboxylase synthetase deficiency prevents the body's cells from using biotin effectively and thus interferes with multiple carboxylase reactions. There can also be a genetic defect affecting the sodium-dependent multivitamin transporter protein.

Biochemical and clinical manifestations of any of these metabolic disorders can include ketolactic acidosis, organic aciduria, hyperammonemia, rash, hypotonia, seizures, developmental delay, alopecia and coma.

== Use in biotechnology ==
Chemically modified versions of biotin are widely used throughout the biotechnology industry to isolate proteins and non-protein compounds for biochemical assays. Because egg-derived avidin binds strongly to biotin with a dissociation constant K_{d} ≈ 10^{−15} M, biotinylated compounds of interest can be isolated from a sample by exploiting this highly stable interaction. First, the chemically modified biotin reagents are bound to the targeted compounds in a solution via a process called biotinylation. The choice of which chemical modification to use is responsible for the biotin reagent binding to a specific protein. Second, the sample is incubated with avidin bound to beads, then rinsed, removing all unbound proteins, while leaving only the biotinylated protein bound to avidin. Last, the biotinylated protein can be eluted from the beads with excess free biotin. The process can also utilize bacteria-derived streptavidin bound to beads, but because it has a higher dissociation constant than avidin, very harsh conditions are needed to elute the biotinylated protein from the beads, which often will denature the protein of interest.

== Interference with medical laboratory results ==
When people are ingesting high levels of biotin in dietary supplements, a consequence can be clinically significant interference with diagnostic blood tests that use biotin-streptavidin technology. This methodology is commonly used to measure levels of hormones such as thyroid hormones, and other analytes such as 25-hydroxyvitamin D. Biotin interference can produce both falsely normal and falsely abnormal results. In the US, biotin as a non-prescription dietary supplement is sold in amounts of 1 to 10 mg per serving, with claims for supporting hair and nail health, and as 300 mg per day as a possibly effective treatment for multiple sclerosis (see § Research). Overconsumption of 5 mg/day or higher causes elevated concentration in plasma that interferes with biotin-streptavidin immunoassays in an unpredictable manner. Healthcare professionals are advised to instruct patients to stop taking biotin supplements for 48 h or even up to weeks before the test, depending on the specific test, dose, and frequency of biotin uptake. Guidance for laboratory staff is proposed to detect and manage biotin interference.

== History ==
In 1916, W. G. Bateman observed that a diet high in raw egg whites caused toxic symptoms in dogs, cats, rabbits, and humans. By 1927, scientists such as Margarete Boas and Helen Parsons had performed experiments demonstrating the symptoms associated with "egg-white injury." They had found that rats fed large amounts of egg whites as their only protein source exhibited neurological dysfunction, hair loss, dermatitis, and eventually, death.

In 1936, Fritz Kögl and Benno Tönnis documented isolating a yeast growth factor in a journal article titled "Darstellung von krystallisiertem biotin aus eigelb." (Representation of crystallized biotin from egg yolk). The name biotin derives from the Greek word bios ('to live') and the suffix "-in" (a general chemical suffix used in organic chemistry). Other research groups, working independently, had isolated the same compound under different names. Hungarian scientist Paul Gyorgy began investigating the factor responsible for egg-white injury in 1933 and in 1939, was successful in identifying what he called "Vitamin H" (the H represents Haar und Haut, German for 'hair and skin'). Further chemical characterization of vitamin H revealed that it was water-soluble and present in high amounts in the liver. After experiments performed with yeast and Rhizobium trifolii, West and Wilson isolated a compound they called co-enzyme R. By 1940, it was recognized that all three compounds were identical and were collectively given the name: biotin. Gyorgy continued his work on biotin and in 1941 published a paper demonstrating that egg-white injury was caused by the binding of biotin by avidin. Unlike for many vitamins, there is insufficient information to establish a recommended dietary allowance, so dietary guidelines identify an "adequate intake" based on best available science with the understanding that at some later date this will be replaced by more exact information.

Using E. coli, a biosynthesis pathway was proposed by Rolfe and Eisenberg in 1968. The initial step was described as a condensation of pimelyl-CoA and alanine to form 7-oxo-8-aminopelargonic acid. From there, they described a three-step process, the last being introducing a sulfur atom to form the tetrahydrothiophene ring.

== Research ==
=== Multiple sclerosis ===
High-dose biotin (300 mg/day = 10,000 times adequate intake) has been used in clinical trials for treatment of multiple sclerosis, a demyelinating autoimmune disease. The hypothesis is that biotin may promote remyelination of the myelin sheath of nerve cells, slowing or even reversing neurodegeneration. The proposed mechanisms are that biotin activates acetyl-CoA carboxylase, a key rate-limiting enzyme during the synthesis of myelin, and by reducing axonal hypoxia through enhanced energy production. Clinical trial results are mixed; a 2019 review concluded that a further investigation of the association between multiple sclerosis symptoms and biotin should be undertaken, whereas two 2020 reviews of a larger number of clinical trials reported no consistent evidence for benefits, and some evidence for increased disease activity and higher risk of relapse.

=== Hair, nails, skin ===
In the United States, biotin is promoted as a dietary supplement for strengthening hair and fingernails, though scientific data supporting these outcomes in humans remains a subject of ongoing research.

A review of biotin as a treatment for hair loss identified case studies of infants and young children with genetic defect biotin deficiency having improved hair growth after supplementation, but went on to report that "there have been no randomized, controlled trials to prove the efficacy of supplementation with biotin in normal, healthy individuals." Biotin is also incorporated into topical hair and skin products with similar claims.

A review of the fingernails literature reported brittle nail improvement as evidence from two pre-1990 clinical trials that had administered an oral dietary supplement of 2.5 mg/day for several months, without a placebo control comparison group. A more recent 2018 meta-review found that "biotin has been used to treat several nail conditions with promising results."

The Dietary Supplement Health and Education Act of 1994 states that the US Food and Drug Administration must allow on the product label what are described as "Structure:Function" (S:F) health claims that ingredient(s) are essential for health. For example: Biotin helps maintain healthy skin, hair, and nails. If a S:F claim is made, the label must include the disclaimer "This statement has not been evaluated by the Food and Drug Administration. This product is not intended to diagnose, treat, cure, or prevent any disease."

== Animals ==
In cattle, biotin is necessary for hoof health. Lameness due to hoof problems is common, with herd prevalence estimated at 10 to 35%. Consequences of lameness include less food consumption, lower milk production, and increased veterinary treatment costs. Results after 4–6 months from supplementing biotin at 20 mg/day into daily diet reduces the risk of lameness. A review of controlled trials reported that supplementation at 20 mg/day increased milk yield by 4.8%. The discussion speculated that this could be an indirect consequence of improved hoof health or a direct effect on milk production.

For horses, conditions such as chronic laminitis, cracked hooves, or dry, brittle feet incapable of holding shoes are a common problem. Biotin is a popular nutritional supplement. There are recommendations that horses need 15 to 25 mg/day. Studies report biotin improves the growth of new hoof horn rather than improving the status of existing hoof, so months of supplementation are needed for the hoof wall to be completely replaced.

== See also ==
- Biotin deficiency
- Biotin sulfoxide
- Biotinidase deficiency
- Biotinylation
- Multiple carboxylase deficiency
- Photobiotin
