= Β-Hydroxy β-methylbutyric acid =

Chemical compound

β-Hydroxy β-methylbutyric acid

- Top: β-Hydroxy β-methylbutyric acid Bottom: β-Hydroxy β-methylbutyrate

Clinical data
- Other names: Conjugate acid form: β-hydroxyisovaleric acid 3-hydroxyisovaleric acid Conjugate base form: hydroxymethylbutyrate
- Routes of administration: By mouth or nasogastric
- ATC code: none

Legal status
- Legal status: US: Dietary supplement; UN: Unscheduled

Pharmacokinetic data
- Metabolites: HMB-CoA, HMG-CoA, mevalonate, cholesterol, acetyl-CoA, acetoacetate, β-hydroxybutyrate
- Onset of action: HMB-FA: 30–60 minutes HMB-Ca: 1–2 hours
- Elimination half-life: HMB-FA: 3 hours HMB-Ca: 2.5 hours
- Excretion: Renal (10–40% excreted)

Identifiers
- IUPAC name: 3-hydroxy-3-methylbutanoic acid
- CAS Number: 625-08-1
- PubChem CID: 69362
- ChemSpider: 62571
- UNII: 3F752311CD
- KEGG: C20827
- ChEBI: CHEBI:37084
- CompTox Dashboard (EPA): DTXSID20211535
- ECHA InfoCard: 100.128.078

Chemical and physical data
- Formula: C_{5}H_{10}O_{3}
- Molar mass: 118.132 g·mol^{−1}
- 3D model (JSmol): Interactive image
- Density: ~1.1 g/cm^{3} at 20 °C
- Melting point: −80 °C (−112 °F) (glass)
- Boiling point: 128 °C (262 °F) at 7 mmHg
- SMILES: CC(C)(CC(=O)O)O
- InChI: InChI=1S/C5H10O3/c1-5(2,8)3-4(6)7/h8H,3H2,1-2H3,(H,6,7); Key:AXFYFNCPONWUHW-UHFFFAOYSA-N

β-Hydroxy β-methylbutyric acid (Note: Synonyms and alternate spellings include: beta-hydroxy beta-methylbutyric acid, 3-hydroxy-3-methylbutanoic acid (IUPAC name), 3-hydroxyisovaleric acid, and beta-hydroxyisovaleric acid.) (HMB), otherwise known as its conjugate base, β-hydroxy β-methylbutyrate, is a naturally produced substance in humans that is used as a dietary supplement and as an ingredient in certain medical foods that are intended to promote wound healing and provide nutritional support for people with muscle wasting due to cancer or HIV/AIDS. In healthy adults, supplementation with HMB has been shown to increase exercise-induced gains in muscle size, muscle strength, and lean body mass, reduce skeletal muscle damage from exercise, improve aerobic exercise performance, and expedite recovery from exercise; in trained and competitive athletes, evidence is mixed on whether it meaningfully augments resistance training–induced gains in lean mass and strength. Medical reviews and meta-analyses indicate that HMB supplementation also helps to preserve or increase lean body mass and muscle strength in individuals experiencing age-related muscle loss. (Note: The meta-analysis found that the average increase in muscle mass due to HMB supplementation in older adults was 0.35 kilograms (0.77 lb). The 95% confidence interval for the estimated increase in muscle mass due to HMB supplementation is 0.11–0.59 kilograms (0.24–1.30 lb). The seven randomized controlled trials that were included in the meta-analysis contained a total of 147 older adults in the HMB treatment groups and 140 older adults in the control groups. The seven trials had durations of 2–11 months and the average duration of the studies, weighted by their sample size, was approximately 6 months.) HMB produces these effects in part by stimulating the production of proteins and inhibiting the breakdown of proteins in muscle tissue. No adverse effects from long-term use as a dietary supplement in adults have been found.

The effects of HMB on human skeletal muscle were first discovered by Steven L. Nissen at Iowa State University in the mid-1990s. As of 2018, HMB has not been banned by the National Collegiate Athletic Association, World Anti-Doping Agency, or any other prominent national or international athletic organization. In 2006, only about 2% of college student athletes in the United States used HMB as a dietary supplement. As of 2017, HMB has reportedly found widespread use as an ergogenic supplement among young athletes.

== Uses ==
=== Available forms ===
HMB is sold as an over-the-counter dietary supplement in the free acid form, β-hydroxy β-methylbutyric acid (HMB-FA), and as a monohydrated calcium salt of the conjugate base, calcium β-hydroxy β-methylbutyrate monohydrate (HMB-Ca, CaHMB). Since only a small fraction of HMB's metabolic precursor, L-leucine, is metabolized into HMB, pharmacologically active concentrations of the compound in blood plasma and muscle can only be achieved by supplementing HMB directly. A healthy adult produces approximately 0.3 grams per day, while supplemental HMB is usually taken in doses of 3–6 grams per day. HMB is sold at a cost of about US$50 per month when taken in doses of 3 grams per day. HMB is also contained in several nutritional products and medical foods marketed by Abbott Laboratories (e.g., certain formulations of Ensure and Juven), and is present in insignificant quantities in certain foods, such as alfalfa, asparagus, avocados, cauliflower, grapefruit, and catfish.

=== Medical ===
Supplemental HMB has been used in clinical trials as a treatment for preserving lean body mass in muscle wasting conditions, particularly sarcopenia, and has been studied in clinical trials as an adjunct therapy in conjunction with resistance exercise. Based upon two medical reviews and a meta-analysis of seven randomized controlled trials, HMB supplementation can preserve or increase lean muscle mass and muscle strength in sarcopenic older adults. HMB does not appear to significantly affect fat mass in older adults. Preliminary clinical evidence suggests that HMB supplementation may also prevent muscle atrophy during bed rest. A growing body of evidence supports the efficacy of HMB in nutritional support for reducing, or even reversing, the loss of muscle mass, muscle function, and muscle strength that occurs in hypercatabolic disease states such as cancer cachexia; consequently, the authors of two 2016 reviews of the clinical evidence recommended that the prevention and treatment of sarcopenia and muscle wasting in general include supplementation with HMB, regular resistance exercise, and consumption of a high-protein diet.

Clinical trials that used HMB for the treatment of muscle wasting have involved the administration of 3 grams of HMB per day under different dosing regimens. According to one review, an optimal dosing regimen is to administer it in one 1 gram dose, three times a day, since this ensures elevated plasma concentrations of HMB throughout the day; however, as of 2016 the best dosing regimen for muscle wasting conditions is still being investigated.

Some branded products that contain HMB (i.e., certain formulations of Ensure and Juven) are medical foods that are intended to be used to provide nutritional support under the care of a doctor in individuals with muscle wasting due to HIV/AIDS or cancer, to promote wound healing following surgery or injury, or when otherwise recommended by a medical professional. Juven, a nutrition product which contains 3 grams of HMB-Ca, 14 grams of L-arginine, and 14 grams of L-glutamine per two servings, has been shown to improve lean body mass during clinical trials in individuals with AIDS and cancer, but not rheumatoid cachexia. Further research involving the treatment of cancer cachexia with Juven over a period of several months is required to adequately determine treatment efficacy.

=== Enhancing performance ===
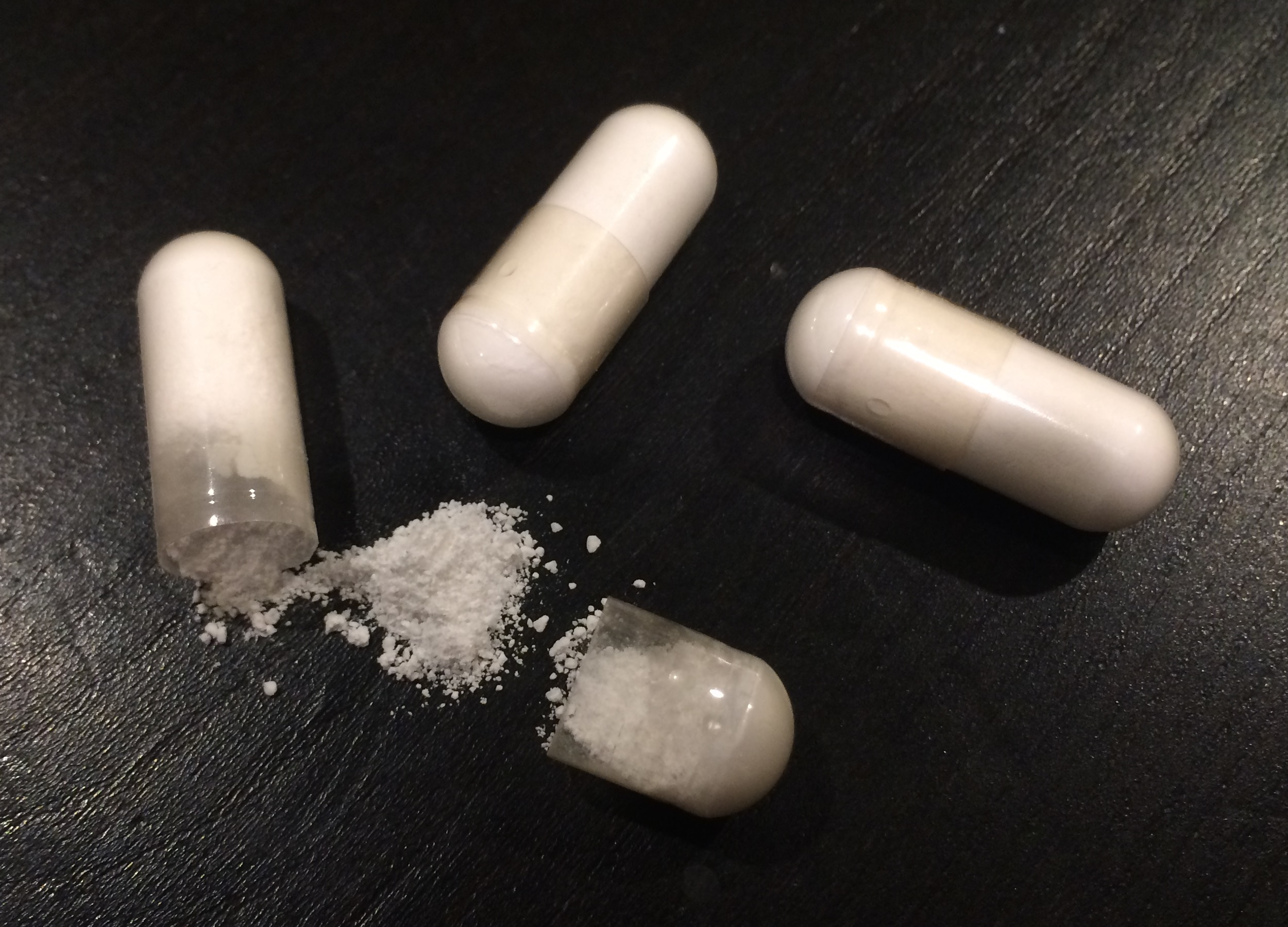
A commercially available formulation of HMB. Each size 000 gelatin capsule contains 1 gram of HMB-Ca and an unspecified amount of microcrystalline cellulose and magnesium stearate.

With an appropriate exercise program, dietary supplementation with 3 grams of HMB per day has been shown to increase exercise-induced gains in muscle size, muscle strength and power, and lean body mass, reduce exercise-induced skeletal muscle damage, (Note: The effect of HMB on skeletal muscle damage has been assessed in studies on humans using four different biomarkers of muscle damage or protein breakdown: serum creatine kinase, serum lactate dehydrogenase, urinary urea nitrogen, and urinary 3-methylhistidine. When exercise intensity and volume are sufficient to cause skeletal muscle damage, such as during long-distance running or progressive overload, HMB supplementation has been demonstrated to attenuate the rise in these biomarkers by 20–60%.) and expedite recovery from high-intensity exercise. Based upon limited clinical research, HMB supplementation may also improve aerobic exercise performance and increase gains in aerobic fitness when combined with high-intensity interval training. These effects of HMB are more pronounced in untrained individuals and athletes who perform high intensity resistance or aerobic exercise. In resistance-trained populations, the effects of HMB on muscle strength and lean body mass are limited. HMB affects muscle size, strength, mass, power, and recovery in part by stimulating myofibrillar muscle protein synthesis and inhibiting muscle protein breakdown through various mechanisms, including the activation of mechanistic target of rapamycin complex 1 (mTORC1) and inhibition of proteasome-mediated proteolysis in skeletal muscles.

The efficacy of HMB supplementation for reducing skeletal muscle damage from prolonged or high-intensity exercise is affected by the time that it is used relative to exercise. The greatest reduction in skeletal muscle damage from a single bout of exercise has been shown to occur when HMB-Ca is ingested 1–2 hours prior to exercise or HMB-FA is ingested 30–60 minutes prior to exercise.

Evidence suggests that HMB's effects on exercise performance and body composition may be enhanced by creatine supplementation. Like HMB, creatine is an ergogenic aid that appears to improve anaerobic capacity and muscle mass in individuals who perform high-intensity exercise. When supplemented together, studies have suggested that creatine produces a synergistic effect that can augment HMB-induced improvements on aerobic and anaerobic performance, endurance, and lean body mass in exercise programs of sufficient intensity, relative to HMB alone.

In 2006, only about 2% of college student athletes in the United States used HMB as a dietary supplement. As of 2017, HMB has found widespread use as an ergogenic supplement among athletes. As of 2018, HMB has not been banned by the National Collegiate Athletic Association, World Anti-Doping Agency, or any other prominent national or international athletic organization.

== Side effects ==
The safety profile of HMB in adult humans is based upon evidence from clinical trials in humans and animal studies. In humans, no adverse effects in young adults or older adults have been reported when HMB is taken in doses of 3 grams per day for up to a year. Studies on young adults taking 6 grams of HMB per day for up to 2 months have also reported no adverse effects. Studies with supplemental HMB on young, growing rats and livestock have reported no adverse effects based upon clinical chemistry or observable characteristics; for humans younger than 18, there is limited data on the safety of supplemental HMB. The human equivalent dose of HMB for the no-observed-adverse-effect level (NOAEL) that was identified in a rat model is approximately 0.4 g/kg of body weight per day. (Note: The NOAEL was established based upon a 3-month study involving several groups of Sprague-Dawley rats that were administered different daily doses of HMB-FA. No adverse effects were observed in any group that received HMB, so the highest daily dose of HMB that was administered in this study was identified as the NOAEL.)

Two animal studies have examined the effects of HMB supplementation in pregnant pigs on the offspring and reported no adverse effects on the fetus. No clinical testing with supplemental HMB has been conducted on pregnant women, and pregnant and lactating women are advised not to take HMB by Metabolic Technologies, Inc., the company that grants licenses to include HMB in dietary supplements, due to a lack of safety studies.

== Pharmacology ==
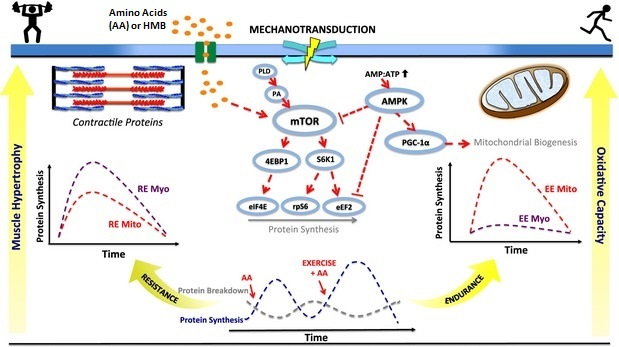
Diagram of the anabolic biomolecular signaling cascades that are involved in myofibrillar muscle protein synthesis and mitochondrial biogenesis in response to physical exercise and specific amino acids or their derivatives (primarily L-leucine and HMB).
Abbreviations and representations
• PLD: phospholipase D
• PA: phosphatidic acid
• mTOR: mechanistic target of rapamycin
• AMP: adenosine monophosphate
• ATP: adenosine triphosphate
• AMPK: AMP-activated protein kinase
• PGC‐1α: peroxisome proliferator-activated receptor gamma coactivator-1α
• S6K1: p70S6 kinase
• 4EBP1: eukaryotic translation initiation factor 4E-binding protein 1
• eIF4E: eukaryotic translation initiation factor 4E
• RPS6: ribosomal protein S6
• eEF2: eukaryotic elongation factor 2
• RE: resistance exercise; EE: endurance exercise
• Myo: myofibrillar; Mito: mitochondrial
• AA: amino acids
• HMB: β-hydroxy β-methylbutyric acid
• ↑ represents activation
• Τ represents inhibition

=== Pharmacodynamics ===
Several components of the signaling cascade that mediates the HMB-induced increase in human skeletal muscle protein synthesis have been identified in vivo. Similar to HMB's metabolic precursor, L-leucine, HMB has been shown to increase protein synthesis in human skeletal muscle via phosphorylation of the mechanistic target of rapamycin (mTOR) and subsequent activation of mTORC1, which leads to protein biosynthesis in cellular ribosomes via phosphorylation of mTORC1's immediate targets (i.e., the p70S6 kinase and the translation repressor protein 4EBP1). (Note: Approximately equal doses of pure HMB-FA (2.42 grams) and L-leucine (3.42 grams) do not produce statistically distinguishable anabolic effects, as measured by the fractional synthesis of myofibrillar proteins, in the skeletal muscle of living humans. At 150 minutes post-ingestion, these doses of HMB-FA and L-leucine increased muscle protein synthesis by ~70% and ~110% respectively in one study.) Supplementation with HMB in several non-human animal species has been shown to increase the serum concentration of growth hormone and insulin-like growth factor 1 (IGF-1) via an unknown mechanism, in turn promoting protein synthesis through increased mTOR phosphorylation. Based upon limited clinical evidence in humans, supplemental HMB appears to increase the secretion of growth hormone and IGF-1 in response to resistance exercise.

As of 2016, the signaling cascade that mediates the HMB-induced reduction in muscle protein breakdown has not been identified in living humans, although it is well-established that it attenuates proteolysis in humans in vivo. Unlike L-leucine, HMB attenuates muscle protein breakdown in an insulin-independent manner in humans. (Note: At 150 minutes post-ingestion, a 2.42 gram dose of pure HMB-FA decreased skeletal muscle protein breakdown in living humans by 57% in one study. The effect of L-leucine on muscle protein breakdown is entirely dependent upon insulin secretion and consequently was not measured in the same study. By comparison, the insulin-dependent reduction in muscle protein breakdown following an entire meal that contains L-leucine and carbohydrates is ~50% on average.) HMB is believed to reduce muscle protein breakdown in humans by inhibiting the 19S and 20S subunits of the ubiquitin–proteasome system in skeletal muscle and by inhibiting apoptosis of skeletal muscle nuclei via unidentified mechanisms.

Based upon animal studies, HMB appears to be metabolized within skeletal muscle into cholesterol, which may then be incorporated into the muscle cell membrane, thereby enhancing membrane integrity and function. The effects of HMB on muscle protein metabolism may help stabilize muscle cell structure. One review suggested that the observed HMB-induced reduction in the plasma concentration of muscle damage biomarkers (i.e., muscle enzymes such as creatine kinase and lactate dehydrogenase) in humans following intense exercise may be due to a cholesterol-mediated improvement in muscle cell membrane function.

HMB has been shown to stimulate the proliferation, differentiation, and fusion of human myosatellite cells in vitro, which potentially increases the regenerative capacity of skeletal muscle, by increasing the protein expression of certain myogenic regulatory factors (e.g., myoD and myogenin) and gene transcription factors (e.g., MEF2). HMB-induced human myosatellite cell proliferation in vitro is mediated through the phosphorylation of the mitogen-activated protein kinases ERK1 and ERK2. HMB-induced human myosatellite differentiation and accelerated fusion of myosatellite cells into muscle tissue in vitro is mediated through the phosphorylation of Akt, a serine/threonine-specific protein kinase.

=== Pharmacokinetics ===
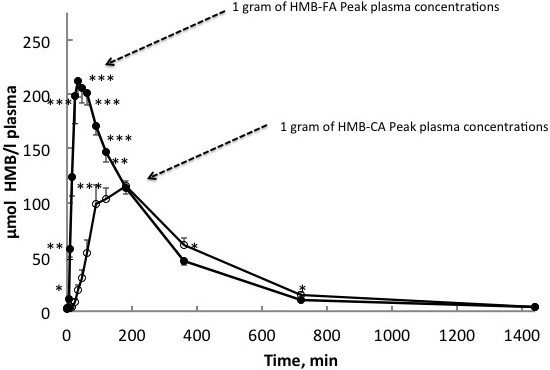
This graph shows the plasma concentration of HMB (in units of micromoles per liter of blood plasma) over time following ingestion of a 1 gram dose of the calcium or free acid form of HMB.

==== Comparison of pharmacokinetics between dosage forms ====
The free acid (HMB-FA) and monohydrated calcium salt (HMB-Ca) forms of HMB have different pharmacokinetics. HMB-FA is more readily absorbed into the bloodstream and has a longer elimination half-life (3 hours) relative to HMB-Ca (2.5 hours). Tissue uptake and utilization of HMB-FA is 25–40% higher than for HMB-Ca. The fraction of an ingested dose that is excreted in urine does not differ between the two forms.

==== Absorption of HMB-Ca ====
After ingestion, HMB-Ca is converted to β-hydroxy β-methylbutyrate following dissociation in the gut. When the HMB-Ca dosage form is ingested, the magnitude and time at which the peak plasma concentration of HMB occurs depends on the dose and concurrent food intake. Higher HMB-Ca doses increase the rate of absorption, resulting in a peak plasma HMB level (C_{max}) that is disproportionately greater than expected of a linear dose-response relationship and which occurs sooner relative to lower doses. (Note: In one study, ingestion of a 1 gram dose of HMB-Ca by healthy volunteers produced a peak plasma HMB level of 120 μM at 2 hours following ingestion, while ingestion of a 3 gram dose of HMB-Ca produced a peak plasma HMB level of 487 μM at 1 hour following ingestion. Consumption of 3 grams of HMB-Ca with 75 grams of glucose resulted in a lower peak plasma HMB level of 352 μM which occurred later at 2 hours following ingestion.) Consumption of HMB-Ca with sugary substances slows the rate of HMB absorption, resulting in a lower peak plasma HMB level that occurs later.

==== Excretion of HMB-Ca ====
HMB is eliminated via the kidneys, with roughly 10–40% of an ingested dose being excreted unchanged in urine. The remaining 60–90% of the dose is retained in tissues or excreted as HMB metabolites. The fraction of a given dose of HMB that is excreted unchanged in urine increases with the dose. (Note: In one study, ingestion of a 1 gram and 3 gram HMB dose resulted in the excretion of 14% and 28% of the dose as HMB in urine, respectively.)

==== Metabolism ====
Biosynthesis and metabolism of β-hydroxy β-methylbutyrate in humans

Human metabolic pathway for HMB and isovaleryl-CoA relative to L-leucine. Of the two major pathways, L-leucine is mostly metabolized into isovaleryl-CoA, while only about 5% is metabolized into HMB.

The metabolism of HMB is catalyzed by an uncharacterized enzyme which converts it to β-hydroxy β-methylbutyryl-CoA (HMB-CoA). HMB-CoA is metabolized by either enoyl-CoA hydratase or another uncharacterized enzyme, producing β-methylcrotonyl-CoA (MC-CoA) or hydroxymethylglutaryl-CoA (HMG-CoA) respectively. MC-CoA is then converted by the enzyme methylcrotonyl-CoA carboxylase to methylglutaconyl-CoA (MG-CoA), which is subsequently converted to HMG-CoA by methylglutaconyl-CoA hydratase. HMG-CoA is then cleaved into acetyl-CoA and acetoacetate by HMG-CoA lyase or used in the production of cholesterol via the mevalonate pathway.

=== Biosynthesis ===
HMB is synthesized in the human body through the metabolism of L-leucine, a branched-chain amino acid. In healthy individuals, approximately 60% of dietary L-leucine is metabolized after several hours, with roughly 5% (2–10% range) of dietary L-leucine being converted to HMB.

The vast majority of L-leucine metabolism is initially catalyzed by the branched-chain amino acid aminotransferase enzyme, producing α-ketoisocaproate (α-KIC). α-KIC is mostly metabolized by the mitochondrial enzyme branched-chain α-ketoacid dehydrogenase, which converts it to isovaleryl-CoA. Isovaleryl-CoA is subsequently metabolized by isovaleryl-CoA dehydrogenase and converted to MC-CoA, which is used in the synthesis of acetyl-CoA and other compounds. During biotin deficiency, HMB can be synthesized from MC-CoA via enoyl-CoA hydratase and an unknown thioesterase enzyme, which convert MC-CoA into HMB-CoA and HMB-CoA into HMB respectively. A relatively small amount of α-KIC is metabolized in the liver by the cytosolic enzyme 4-hydroxyphenylpyruvate dioxygenase (KIC dioxygenase), which converts α-KIC to HMB. In healthy individuals, this minor pathway – which involves the conversion of L-leucine to α-KIC and then HMB – is the predominant route of HMB synthesis.

== Chemistry ==
Skeletal formula of butyric acid with the alpha, beta, and gamma carbons marked

Formula of β-hydroxy β-methylbutyric acid

β-Hydroxy β-methylbutyric acid is a monocarboxylic β-hydroxy acid and natural product with the molecular formula C_{5}H_{10}O_{3}. At room temperature, pure β-hydroxy β-methylbutyric acid occurs as a transparent, colorless to light yellow liquid which is soluble in water. β-Hydroxy β-methylbutyric acid is a weak acid with a pK_{a} of 4.4. Its refractive index ($\mathit{n}_\text{25°C}^\mathrm{\lambda=589nm}$) is 1.42.

=== Chemical structure ===
β-Hydroxy β-methylbutyric acid is a member of the carboxylic acid family of organic compounds. It is a structural analog of butyric acid with a hydroxyl functional group and a methyl substituent located on its beta carbon. By extension, other structural analogs include β-hydroxybutyric acid and β-methylbutyric acid.

=== Synthesis ===
A variety of synthetic routes to β-hydroxy β-methylbutyric acid have been developed. The first reported chemical syntheses approached HMB by oxidation of alkene, vicinal diol, and alcohol precursors:

- in 1877, Russian chemists Michael and Alexander Zaytsev reported the preparation of HMB by oxidation of 2-methylpent-4-en-2-ol with chromic acid (H_{2}CrO_{4});
- in 1880 and 1889, Schirokoff and Reformatsky (respectively) reported that the oxidative cleavage of the vicinal diol 4-methylpentane-1,2,4-triol with acidified potassium permanganate (KMnO_{4}) yields HMB – this result is closest related to the first synthesis as cold dilute KMnO_{4} oxidises alkenes to vicinal cis-diols which hot acid KMnO_{4} further oxidises to carbonyl-containing compounds, and the diol intermediate is not obtained when hot acidic conditions are used for alkene oxidation. In other words, racemic 4-methylpentane-1,2,4-triol is a derivative of 2-methylpent-4-en-2-ol and β-hydroxy β-methylbutyric acid is a derivative of both; and,
- in 1892, Kondakow reported the preparation of HMB by permanganate oxidation of 3-methylbutane-1,3-diol.

First synthetic routes to β-hydroxy β-methylbutyric acid

Depending on the experimental conditions, cycloaddition of acetone and ketene produces either β-isovalerolactone or 4,4-dimethyloxetan-2-one, both of which hydrolyze under basic conditions to yield the conjugate base of HMB. The haloform reaction provides another pathway to HMB involving the exhaustive halogenation of the methyl-ketone region of diacetone alcohol with sodium hypobromite or sodium hypochlorite; Diacetone alcohol is readily available from the aldol condensation of acetone. An organometallic approach to HMB involves the carboxylation of tert-butyl alcohol with carbon monoxide and Fenton's reagent (hydrogen peroxide and ferrous iron). Alternatively, HMB can be prepared through microbial oxidation of β-methylbutyric acid by the fungus Galactomyces reessii.

Later synthetic routes to β-hydroxy β-methylbutyric acid

=== Detection in body fluids ===
HMB concentrations measured in healthy individuals
Biofluid	Age group	Concentration			Sources
Biofluid	Age group	Mean	Range	Units	Sources
Blood plasma	Adults (18+)	4.0	0–10.0	μM	
CSF	Adults (18+)	4.0	2.0–6.0	μM	
Sarcoplasma	Adults (21–23)	7.0	4.0–10.0	μM	
Breast milk	Adults (18+)	–	42–164	μg/L	
Urine	Adults (18+)	–	3.2–25.0	μmol/mmol creatinine	
Urine	Children (1–18)	–	0–68	μmol/mmol creatinine	

The concentration of naturally produced HMB has been measured in several human body fluids using nuclear magnetic resonance spectroscopy, liquid chromatography–mass spectrometry, and gas chromatography–mass spectrometry methods. In the blood plasma and cerebrospinal fluid (CSF) of healthy adults, the average molar concentration of HMB has been measured at 4.0 micromolar (μM). The average concentration of HMB in the intramuscular fluid of healthy men of ages 21–23 has been measured at 7.0 μM. In the urine of healthy individuals of any age, the excreted urinary concentration of HMB has been measured in a range of 0–68 micromoles per millimole (μmol/mmol) of creatinine. In the breast milk of healthy lactating women, HMB and L-leucine have been measured in ranges of 42–164 μg/L and 2.1–88.5 mg/L. In comparison, HMB has been detected and measured in the milk of healthy cows at a concentration of <20–29 μg/L. This concentration is far too low to be an adequate dietary source of HMB for obtaining pharmacologically active concentrations of the compound in blood plasma.

In a study where participants consumed 2.42 grams of pure HMB-FA while fasting, the average plasma HMB concentration increased from a basal level of 5.1 μM to 408 μM after 30 minutes. At 150 minutes post-ingestion, the average plasma HMB concentration among participants was 275 μM.

Abnormal HMB concentrations in urine and blood plasma have been noted in several disease states where it may serve as a diagnostic biomarker, particularly in the case of metabolic disorders. The following table lists some of these disorders along with the associated HMB concentrations detected in urine or blood plasma.

Abnormal HMB concentrations measured in disease states
Medical condition	Biofluid	Age group	Concentration			Sources
Medical condition	Biofluid	Age group	Mean	Range	Units	Sources
Biotinidase deficiency^{†}	Blood	Adults (18+)	9.5	0–19.0	μM	
Biotinidase deficiency^{†}	Blood	Children (1–13)	88.0	10.0–166.0	μM	
Biotinidase deficiency^{†}	Urine	Children (1–13)	275.0	50.0–500.0	μmol/mmol creatinine	
3-Methylglutaconic aciduria (Type I)^{†}	Urine	Children (1–13)	200.0	150.0–250.0	μmol/mmol creatinine	
Eosinophilic esophagitis	Urine	Children (1–13)	247.4	0–699.4	μmol/mmol creatinine	
Gastroesophageal reflux disease	Urine	Children (1–13)	119.8	5.5–234.0	μmol/mmol creatinine	
HMG-CoA lyase deficiency^{†}	Urine	Children (1–13)	2030.0	60.0–4000.0	μmol/mmol creatinine	
MC-CoA carboxylase deficiency^{†}	Urine	Children (1–13)	30350.0	1700.0–59000.0	μmol/mmol creatinine	
A ^{†} indicates that the medical condition is a metabolic disorder.

== History ==
The first reported chemical synthesis of HMB was published in 1877 by the Russian chemists Michael and Alexander Zaytsev. HMB was isolated from the bark of Erythrophleum couminga (a Madagascan tree) in 1941 by Leopold Ružička. The earliest reported isolation of HMB as a human metabolite was by Tanaka and coworkers in 1968 from a patient with isovaleric acidemia.

The effects of HMB on human skeletal muscle were first discovered by Steven L. Nissen at Iowa State University in the mid-1990s. Nissen founded a company called Metabolic Technologies, Inc. (MTI) around the time of his discovery, which later acquired six HMB-related patents that the company has used to license the right to manufacture and incorporate HMB into dietary supplements. When it first became available commercially in the late 1990s, HMB was marketed solely as an exercise supplement to help athletes and bodybuilders build muscle. MTI subsequently developed two HMB-containing products, Juven and Revigor, to which Abbott Nutrition obtained the market rights in 2003 and 2008 respectively. Since then, Abbott has marketed Juven as a medical food and the Revigor brand of HMB as an active ingredient in food products (e.g., certain formulations of Ensure) and other medical foods (e.g., certain formulations of Juven).

== See also ==
- 3-Aminoisobutyric acid
