= C6H10O3 =

The molecular formula C_{6}H_{10}O_{3} may refer to:

- Diglycidyl ether
- Ethyl acetoacetate
- (Hydroxyethyl)methacrylate
- Ketoisocaproic acid
  - α-Ketoisocaproic acid
  - β-Ketoisocaproic acid
- Propionic anhydride
