= 3-Methylcrotonyl-CoA carboxylase deficiency =

- Other names: 3MCC deficiency, 3-methylcrotonylglycinuria, MCC deficiency, MCCD
- Skeletal formula of methylcrotonyl coenzyme A
- Specialty: Medical genetics

3-Methylcrotonyl-CoA carboxylase deficiency also known as 3-Methylcrotonylglycinuria is an inborn error of leucine metabolism and is inherited through an autosomal recessive fashion. 3-Methylcrotonyl-CoA carboxylase deficiency is caused by mutations in the MCCC1 gene, formerly known as MMCA, or the MCCC2 gene, formerly known as MCCB. MCCC1 encodes the a-subunits of 3-methylcrotonyl-CoA carboxylase while MCCC2 encodes the b-subunits. The clinical presentation of 3-Methylcrotonyl-CoA carboxylase deficiency is varied, even within members of the same family.

Manifestations of 3-Methylcrotonyl-CoA carboxylase deficiency range from asymptomatic to neonatal onset with extreme neurological symptoms and even fatal cases. 3-Methylcrotonyl-CoA carboxylase deficiency is diagnosed by increased 3-hydroxyisovaleric acid and 3-methylcrotonylglycine in the urine. 3-hydroxyisovalerylcarnitine is often found in both the urine and blood.

The diagnosis of 3-Methylcrotonyl-CoA carboxylase deficiency is confirmed by decreased enzyme activity in fibroblasts or white blood cells. Although no treatment options have been proven to help manage 3-Methylcrotonyl-CoA carboxylase deficiency proposed treatments include L-carnitine supplements, glycine administration, biotin supplements and dietary restriction of leucine. 3-Methylcrotonyl-CoA carboxylase deficiency is the most common organic aciduria detected by newborn screening programs in Australia, North America, and Europe.

== Signs and symptoms ==
Those with 3-Methylcrotonyl-CoA carboxylase deficiency typically display normal development until 6 months to 3 years old, when patients present with an acute episode. These acute episodes are typically brought on by increased protein load or intercurrent infections. During metabolic crisis, moderate hyperammonemia, hypoglycemia, and metabolic acidosis have been noted. There is a broad spectrum of clinical manifestations ranging from cardiomyopathy, developmental delays, leukodystrophy, necrotizing encephalopathy, respiratory failure, hypotonia, cerebral palsy and failure to thrive. Carnitine deficiency is found in about 50% of cases.

Over 90% of those diagnosed with 3-Methylcrotonyl-CoA carboxylase deficiency by newborn screening remain asymptomatic. The medical abnormalities that present in the few who do show symptoms are not always clearly related to 3-Methylcrotonyl-CoA carboxylase deficiency. Manifestations of 3-Methylcrotonyl-CoA carboxylase deficiency vary even among family members who share a common environment and genetics.

== Genetics ==
The MCCC1 and MCCC2 genes make protein subunits that come together to form an enzyme called 3-methylcrotonyl-CoA carboxylase. This enzyme plays an essential role in breaking down proteins from the diet. Specifically, the enzyme is responsible for the fourth step in processing leucine. If a mutation in the MCCC1 or MCCC2 gene reduces or eliminates the activity of 3-methylcrotonyl-CoA carboxylase, the body is unable to process leucine properly. As a result, toxic byproducts of leucine processing build up to harmful levels, damaging the brain and nervous system. This condition is inherited in an autosomal recessive pattern.

== Diagnosis ==
3-Methylcrotonyl-CoA carboxylase deficiency is diagnosed by the detection of organic acids in urine using gas chromatography or mass spectrometry and analysis of the blood by liquid chromatography-tandem mass spectrometry. 3-Methylcrotonyl-CoA carboxylase deficiency is characterized by increased 3-hydroxyisovaleric acid and 3-methylcrotonylglycine levels in the urine. The acylcarnitines profile shows elevated concentrations of 3-hydroxyisovalerylcarnitine as well as an increased ratio of 3-hydroxyisovalerylcarnitine to propionylcarnitine.

Since genotype isn't predictive of phenotype, DNA testing isn't necessary. However, DNA analysis may help confirm 3-Methylcrotonyl-CoA carboxylase deficiency when the diagnosis is uncertain.

3-hydroxyisovalerylcarnitine is also elevated in other metabolism disorders such as 3-Hydroxy-3-methylglutaryl-CoA lyase deficiency, biotinidase deficiency, multiple carboxylase deficiency, mitochondrial acetoacetyl-CoA thiolase deficiency and malonic aciduria. 3-Methylcrotonyl-CoA carboxylase deficiency is differentiated by the lack of other urine metabolites and by measuring the activity of 3-methylcrotonyl-CoA carboxylase, biotinidase, and other biotin-dependent carboxylases.

== Screening ==
It is one of the 29 conditions currently recommended for newborn screening by the American College of Medical Genetics.

== Treatment ==
Symptoms can be reduced by avoiding leucine, an amino acid. Leucine is a component of most protein-rich foods; therefore, a low-protein diet is recommended. Some isolated cases of this disorder have responded to supplemental biotin; this is not altogether surprising, consider that other biotin-related genetic disorders (such as biotinidase deficiency and holocarboxylase synthetase deficiency) can be treated solely with biotin. Individuals with these multiple carboxylase disorders have the same problem with leucine catabolism as those with 3-methylcrotonyl-CoA carboxylase deficiency.

== See also ==
- Leucine
- Isovaleric acidemia
