= Β-Hydroxy β-methylbutyryl-CoA =

β-Hydroxy β-methylbutyryl-CoA

Names
- IUPAC name 3′-O-Phosphonoadenosine 5′-[(3R)-3-hydroxy-4-{[3-({2-[(3-hydroxy-3-methylbutanoyl)sulfanyl]ethyl}amino)-3-oxopropyl]amino}-2,2-dimethyl-4-oxobutyl dihydrogen diphosphate]
- Systematic IUPAC name O^{1}-{[(2R,3S,4R,5R)-5-(6-Amino-9H-purin-9-yl)-4-hydroxy-3-(phosphonooxy)oxolan-2-yl]methyl} O^{3}-[(3R)-3-hydroxy-4-{[3-({2-[(3-hydroxy-3-methylbutanoyl)sulfanyl]ethyl}amino)-3-oxopropyl]amino}-2,2-dimethyl-4-oxobutyl] dihydrogen diphosphate
- Other names β-hydroxyisovaleryl-CoA; 3-hydroxyisovaleryl-CoA; 3-hydroxy-3-methylbutyryl-CoA

Identifiers
| 3D model (JSmol) | Interactive image |
| ChEBI | CHEBI:28291 |
| ChemSpider | 10140181 |
| KEGG | C05998 |
| PubChem CID | 11966188 |
| CompTox Dashboard (EPA) | DTXSID001336036 |
- InChI: InChI=1S/C26H44N7O18P3S/c1-25(2,20(37)23(38)29-6-5-15(34)28-7-8-55-16(35)9-26(3,4)39)11-48-54(45,46)51-53(43,44)47-10-14-19(50-52(40,41)42)18(36)24(49-14)33-13-32-17-21(27)30-12-31-22(17)33/h12-14,18-20,24,36-37,39H,5-11H2,1-4H3,(H,28,34)(H,29,38)(H,43,44)(H,45,46)(H2,27,30,31)(H2,40,41,42)/t14-,18-,19-,20+,24-/m1/s1 Key: PEVZKILCBDEOBT-CITAKDKDSA-N
- SMILES: CC(C)(CC(=O)SCCNC(=O)CCNC(=O)[C@@H](C(C)(C)COP(=O)(O)OP(=O)(O)OC[C@@H]1[C@H]([C@H]([C@@H](O1)N2C=NC3=C(N=CN=C32)N)O)OP(=O)(O)O)O)O

Properties
| Chemical formula | C_{26}H_{44}N_{7}O_{18}P_{3}S |
| Molar mass | 867.649946 |
- Except where otherwise noted, data are given for materials in their standard state (at 25 °C [77 °F], 100 kPa). Infobox references

β-Hydroxy β-methylbutyryl-coenzyme A (HMB-CoA), also known as 3-hydroxyisovaleryl-CoA, is a metabolite of L-leucine that is produced in the human body. Its immediate precursors are β-hydroxy β-methylbutyric acid (HMB) and β-methylcrotonoyl-CoA (MC-CoA). It can be metabolized into HMB, MC-CoA, and HMG-CoA in humans.

== Metabolic pathway ==
Leucine metabolism in humans

Human metabolic pathway for HMB and isovaleryl-CoA relative to L-leucine. Of the two major pathways, L-leucine is mostly metabolized into isovaleryl-CoA, while only about 5% is metabolized into HMB.
