= Methylglutaconyl-CoA hydratase =

Protein-coding gene in the species Homo sapiens

AUH

Identifiers
- Aliases: AUH, AU RNA binding protein/enoyl-CoA hydratase, Methylglutaconyl-CoA hydratase, AU RNA binding methylglutaconyl-CoA hydratase
- External IDs: OMIM: 600529; MGI: 1338011; GeneCards: AUH
Available structures
PDB	Ortholog search: PDBe RCSB
PDB	List of PDB id codes 1HZD, 2ZQQ, 2ZQR
Enzyme activity
EC #	BRENDA	ExPASy	KEGG	MetaCyc
4.2.1.18	↗	↗	↗	↗
4.2.1.56	↗	↗	↗	↗

Gene location (Human)
Chr.	Chromosome 9 (human)
Band	9q22.31	Start	91,213,815 bp
Band	9q22.31	End	91,361,918 bp

Gene location (Mouse)
Chr.	Chromosome 13 (mouse)
Band	13|13 A5- B1	Start	52,989,155 bp
Band	13|13 A5- B1	End	53,083,717 bp
RNA expression pattern
Bgee	Human / Mouse (ortholog); Top expressed in: renal medulla; lateral nuclear group of thalamus; kidney tubule; right ventricle; pons; human kidney; parotid gland; myocardium of left ventricle; right adrenal cortex; left adrenal cortex / Top expressed in: facial motor nucleus; zygote; right ventricle; right kidney; secondary oocyte; interventricular septum; proximal tubule; myocardium of ventricle; muscle of thigh; plantaris muscle; More reference expression data
BioGPS	n/a
Gene ontology
Molecular function	methylglutaconyl-CoA hydratase activity; enoyl-CoA hydratase activity; catalytic activity; lyase activity; RNA binding; mRNA 3'-UTR binding; itaconyl-CoA hydratase activity
Cellular component	mitochondrial matrix; mitochondrion
Biological process	branched-chain amino acid catabolic process; metabolism; leucine catabolic process; fatty acid beta-oxidation
Sources:Amigo / QuickGO
Orthologs
Databases	NCBI: entry; OMA: entry
Species	Human	Mouse
Entrez	549	11992
Ensembl	ENSG00000148090	ENSMUSG00000021460
UniProt	Q13825	Q9JLZ3
RefSeq (mRNA)	NM_001306190; NM_001698; NM_001351431; NM_001351432; NM_001351433	NM_016709
RefSeq (protein)	NP_001293119; NP_001689; NP_001338360; NP_001338361; NP_001338362	NP_057918
Location (UCSC)	Chr 9: 91.21 – 91.36 Mb	Chr 13: 52.99 – 53.08 Mb
PubMed search
- Wikidata
View/Edit Human	View/Edit Mouse

3-Methylglutaconyl-CoA hydratase, also known as MG-CoA hydratase and AUH, is an enzyme (EC 4.2.1.18) encoded by the AUH gene on chromosome 19. It is a member of the enoyl-CoA hydratase/isomerase superfamily, but it is the only member of that family that is able to bind to RNA. Not only does it bind to RNA, AUH has also been observed to be involved in the metabolic enzymatic activity, making it a dual-role protein. Mutations of this gene have been found to cause a disease called 3-Methylglutaconic Acuduria Type 1.

== Structure ==
The enzyme AUH has a molecular mass of 32 kDa and the AUH gene consists of 18 exons, is 1.7 kb long, and is mainly found in kidney, skeletal muscle, heart, liver, and spleen cells. AUH has a similar fold that is found in other members of the enoyl-CoA hydratase/isomerase family; however, it is a hexamer as a dimer of trimers. Also unlike other members of its family, AUH's surface is positively charged in contrast to the negative charge seen on that of other classes. Between the two trimers of the enzyme, wide clefts were seen with a highly positive charge and lysine residues in alpha helix H1. These lysine residues were shown to be the main reason why AUH is able to bind to RNA rather than its counterparts. Moreover, it has been found that the oligomeric state of AUH depends on whether or not RNA is present. If RNA is near, the AUH will take on an asymmetric shape that loses the 3- and 2-fold crystallographic rotation axes, because of realignment of the internal 3-fold axes of the trimers. Because this enzyme has weak, short-chain enoyl-CoA hydratase activity, AUH also has a hydrase active-site pocket created by H2A-H3 alpha-helices and the H4A 310 helix of one subunit, and the H8 and H9 alpha-helices of the adjacent subunit within the same trimer. This active-site pocket is not affected by the change in oligomeric state when AUH is in the presence of RNA.

== Function ==
AUH is seen to catalyze the transformation of 3-methylglutaconyl-CoA to 3-hydroxy-3-methylglutaryl CoA in the leucine catabolism pathway. Localized in the mitochondria, AUH is responsible for the fifth step in the leucine degradation pathway and deficiencies in this enzyme's activity leads to a metabolic block in which 3-methylglutaconyl-CoA, accumulates in the mitochondrial matrix. Also, these reductions in the enzyme's activity leads to increases in 3-methylglutaric acid and 3-hydroxyisovaleric acid. Another function of AUH is that it binds to an AU-rich element (ARE), containing clusters of the penta-nucleotide AUUUA. AREs have been found in the 3’-untranslated regions of mRNA and they promote mRNA degradation. By binding with ARE, AUH has been suggested to play a role in neuron survival and transcript stability. AUH is also responsible for regulating mitochondrial protein synthesis and is essential for mitochondrial RNA metabolism, biogenesis, morphology, and function. Decreased levels of AUH also lead to slower cell expansion and cell growth. These functions allow AUH to show us that there could be a potential connection between mitochondrial metabolism and gene regulation. Also, reduced or overexprsessed levels of AUH can lead to defects in mitochondrial translation, ultimately leading up to changes in mitochondrial morphology, decreased RNA stability, biogenesis, and respiratory function.

Leucine metabolism in humans

Human metabolic pathway for HMB and isovaleryl-CoA relative to L-leucine. Of the two major pathways, L-leucine is mostly metabolized into isovaleryl-CoA, while only about 5% is metabolized into HMB.

== Clinical significance ==
The lack of AUH is most impactful to the human body by causing 3-Methylglutaconic Acuduria Type 1, which is an autosomal recessive disorder of leucine degradation and can range in severity from developmental delay to slowly progressive leukoencephalopathy in adults. Mutations in the AUH gene has been seen in 10 different sites (5 missense, 3 splicing, 1 single nucleotide deletion and 1 single nucleotide duplication) and are present in certain patients who have the disorder. Deletions of exons 1–3 in the gene suggest that these exons are responsible for the biochemical and clinical characteristics of 3-Methylglutaconic Acuduria Type 1. These mutations cause for the deficiency of 3-methylglutaconyl-CoA hydratase which leads to the amalgamation of 3-methylglutaconyl-CoA, 3-methylglutaric acid, and 3-hydroxyisovaleric acid which eventually leads to 3-Methylglutaconic Acuduria Type 1.

== Interactions ==
AUH has been seen to interact with:

- ARE
- 3-methylglutaconyl-CoA
