= MCCC1 =

Identifiers
- Aliases: MCCC1, MCC-B, MCCA, methylcrotonoyl-CoA carboxylase 1, methylcrotonyl-CoA carboxylase subunit 1, MCCCalpha
- External IDs: OMIM: 609010; MGI: 1919289; GeneCards: MCCC1
Available structures
PDB	Ortholog search: PDBe RCSB
PDB	List of PDB id codes 2EJM
Enzyme activity
EC #	BRENDA	ExPASy	KEGG	MetaCyc
6.4.1.4	↗	↗	↗	↗

Gene location (Human)
Chr.	Chromosome 3 (human)
Band	3q27.1	Start	183,015,218 bp
Band	3q27.1	End	183,116,075 bp

Gene location (Mouse)
Chr.	Chromosome 3 (mouse)
Band	3|3 B	Start	36,013,461 bp
Band	3|3 B	End	36,054,827 bp
RNA expression pattern
Bgee	Human / Mouse (ortholog); Top expressed in: body of pancreas; right lobe of liver; right lung; right adrenal cortex; epithelium of colon; human kidney; right uterine tube; left ovary; left adrenal cortex; body of stomach / Top expressed in: brown adipose tissue; right kidney; right ventricle; proximal tubule; Epithelium of choroid plexus; epithelium of stomach; white adipose tissue; tunica adventitia of aorta; human kidney; myocardium of ventricle; More reference expression data
BioGPS	n/a
Gene ontology
Molecular function	biotin binding; nucleotide binding; methylcrotonoyl-CoA carboxylase activity; ligase activity; protein binding; ATP binding; metal ion binding; biotin carboxylase activity
Cellular component	cytosol; mitochondrion; mitochondrial matrix; methylcrotonoyl-CoA carboxylase complex; 3-methylcrotonyl-CoA carboxylase complex, mitochondrial
Biological process	biotin metabolic process; protein heterooligomerization; leucine catabolic process; branched-chain amino acid catabolic process
Sources:Amigo / QuickGO
Orthologs
Databases	NCBI: entry; OMA: entry
Species	Human	Mouse
Entrez	56922	72039
Ensembl	ENSG00000078070	ENSMUSG00000027709
UniProt	Q96RQ3	Q99MR8
RefSeq (mRNA)	NM_001293273; NM_020166; NM_001363880	NM_023644
RefSeq (protein)	NP_001280202; NP_064551; NP_001350809	NP_076133
Location (UCSC)	Chr 3: 183.02 – 183.12 Mb	Chr 3: 36.01 – 36.05 Mb
PubMed search
- Wikidata
View/Edit Human	View/Edit Mouse

Methylcrotonoyl-CoA carboxylase subunit alpha is an enzyme that in humans is encoded by the MCCC1 gene.

== Function ==
MCCC1 encodes the α-subunit of the mitochondrial enzyme methylcrotonyl-CoA carboxylase (MCC), which catalyzes a key carboxylation step in the catabolic pathway of the branched-chain amino acid leucine. The MCC holoenzyme forms a dodecameric α6β6 complex in which MCCC1-derived α subunits contain the biotin-binding and carboxylation domains essential for enzymatic activity.

== Clinical significance ==
Pathogenic variants in MCCC1 cause 3-methylcrotonyl-CoA carboxylase deficiency, an autosomal recessive metabolic disorder characterized by impaired leucine degradation and accumulation of organic acid intermediates.

Beyond its metabolic role, MCCC1 has been implicated in immune regulation, where it enhances antiviral signaling through MAVS-mediated activation of NF-κB and interferon pathways, and in neurodegenerative disease genetics, with intronic variants such as rs12637471 associated with altered gene expression and Parkinson’s disease susceptibility.
