= Isovaleryl-CoA dehydrogenase =

Class of enzymes

isovaleryl-CoA dehydrogenase
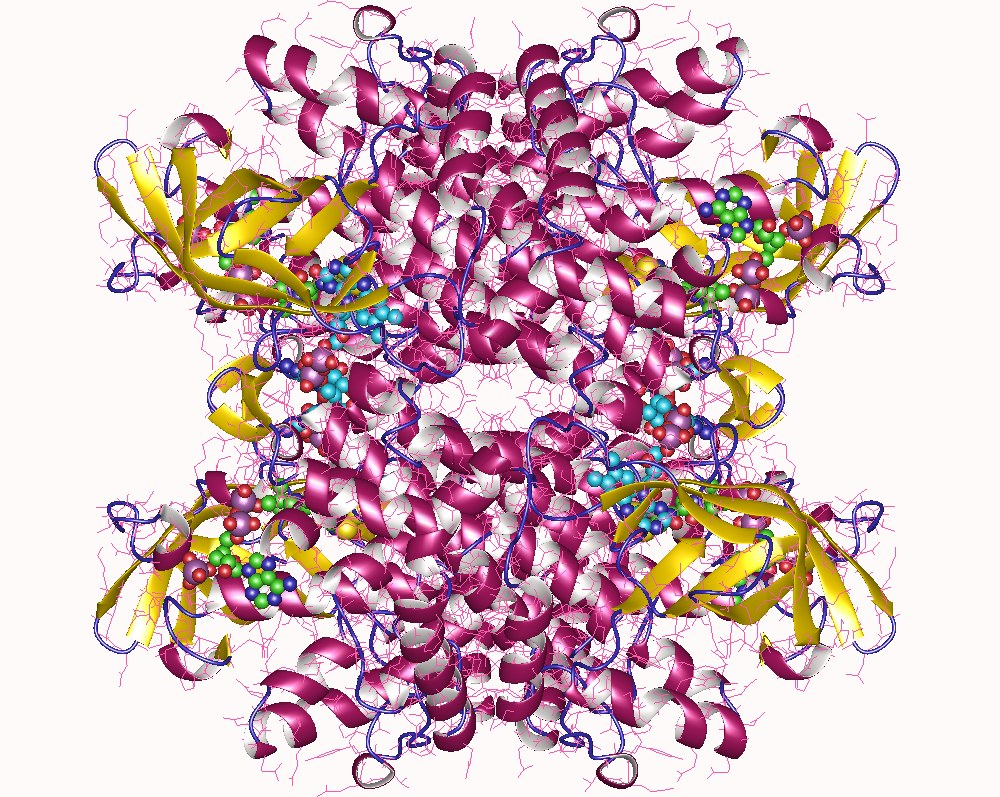
- Isovaleryl-CoA dehydrogenase tetramer, Human

Identifiers
- EC no.: 1.3.8.4
- CAS no.: 37274-61-6

Databases
- BRENDA: enzyme data
- ExPASy: NiceZyme view
- KEGG: enzyme entry
- MetaCyc: metabolic pathway
- Rhea: reactions
- PDB structures: RCSB PDB PDBe PDBsum
- Gene Ontology: AmiGO / QuickGO
Search
- PMC: articles
- PubMed: articles
- NCBI: proteins

IVD

Identifiers
- Aliases: IVD, IVDH, ACAD2, isovaleryl-CoA dehydrogenase
- External IDs: OMIM: 607036; MGI: 1929242; GeneCards: IVD
Available structures
PDB	Ortholog search: PDBe RCSB
PDB	List of PDB id codes 1IVH
Enzyme activity
EC #	BRENDA	ExPASy	KEGG	MetaCyc
1.3.8.1	↗	↗	↗	↗
1.3.8.4	↗	↗	↗	↗

Gene location (Human)
Chr.	Chromosome 15 (human)
Band	15q15.1	Start	40,405,485 bp
Band	15q15.1	End	40,435,947 bp

Gene location (Mouse)
Chr.	Chromosome 2 (mouse)
Band	2|2 E5	Start	118,692,435 bp
Band	2|2 E5	End	118,713,390 bp
RNA expression pattern
Bgee	Human / Mouse (ortholog); Top expressed in: right lobe of thyroid gland; left lobe of thyroid gland; right lobe of liver; right adrenal cortex; anterior pituitary; left adrenal gland; left adrenal cortex; right ovary; left ovary; muscle of thigh / Top expressed in: neural layer of retina; right kidney; interventricular septum; right ventricle; myocardium of ventricle; cardiac muscles; proximal tubule; cardiac muscle tissue of left ventricle; human kidney; muscle of thigh; More reference expression data
BioGPS	n/a
Gene ontology
Molecular function	oxidoreductase activity, acting on the CH-CH group of donors; oxidoreductase activity; acyl-CoA dehydrogenase activity; flavin adenine dinucleotide binding; isovaleryl-CoA dehydrogenase activity; protein binding
Cellular component	mitochondrial matrix; mitochondrion
Biological process	branched-chain amino acid catabolic process; leucine catabolic process; fatty acid beta-oxidation using acyl-CoA dehydrogenase
Sources:Amigo / QuickGO
Orthologs
Databases	NCBI: entry; OMA: entry
Species	Human	Mouse
Entrez	3712	56357
Ensembl	ENSG00000128928	ENSMUSG00000027332
UniProt	P26440	Q9JHI5
RefSeq (mRNA)	NM_001159508; NM_002225; NM_001354597; NM_001354598; NM_001354599 NM_001354600; NM_001354601	NM_019826
RefSeq (protein)	NP_001152980; NP_002216; NP_001341526; NP_001341527; NP_001341528 NP_001341529; NP_001341530	NP_062800
Location (UCSC)	Chr 15: 40.41 – 40.44 Mb	Chr 2: 118.69 – 118.71 Mb
PubMed search
- Wikidata
View/Edit Human	View/Edit Mouse

Isovaleryl-CoA dehydrogenase (EC 1.3.8.4) is an enzyme that in humans is encoded by the gene IVD. More generally, it refers to any enzyme that catalyzes the chemical reaction

3-methylbutanoyl-CoA + acceptor $\rightleftharpoons$ 3-methylbut-2-enoyl-CoA + reduced acceptor

Thus, the two substrates of this enzyme are 3-methylbutanoyl-CoA and acceptor, whereas its two products are 3-methylbut-2-enoyl-CoA and reduced acceptor.

This enzyme belongs to the family of oxidoreductases, specifically those acting on the CH-CH group of donor with other acceptors. The systematic name of this enzyme class is 3-methylbutanoyl-CoA:acceptor oxidoreductase. Other names in common use include isovaleryl-coenzyme A dehydrogenase, isovaleroyl-coenzyme A dehydrogenase, and 3-methylbutanoyl-CoA:(acceptor) oxidoreductase. This enzyme participates in valine, leucine and isoleucine degradation. It employs one cofactor, FAD.

== Structural studies ==
As of late 2007, only one structure has been solved for this class of enzymes, with the PDB accession code PDB: 1IVH. It was created by a group containing K.A.Tiffany, D.L.Roberts, M.Wang, R.Paschke, A.-W.A.Mohsen, J.Vockley, and J.J.P.Kim. The structure was released on May 20, 1998.Doe. "PDBsum entry: 1ivh".

== Leucine metabolism ==
Leucine metabolism in humans

Human metabolic pathway for HMB and isovaleryl-CoA relative to L-leucine. Of the two major pathways, L-leucine is mostly metabolized into isovaleryl-CoA, while only about 5% is metabolized into HMB.
