= Phloroisovalerophenone synthase =

phloroisovalerophenone synthase

Identifiers
- EC no.: 2.3.1.156

Databases
- IntEnz: IntEnz view
- BRENDA: BRENDA entry
- ExPASy: NiceZyme view
- KEGG: KEGG entry
- MetaCyc: metabolic pathway
- PRIAM: profile
- PDB structures: RCSB PDB PDBe PDBsum
- Gene Ontology: AmiGO / QuickGO
Search
- PMC: articles
- PubMed: articles
- NCBI: proteins

In enzymology, a phloroisovalerophenone synthase (EC 2.3.1.156) is an enzyme that catalyzes the chemical reaction

isovaleryl-CoA + 3 malonyl-CoA $\rightleftharpoons$ 4 CoASH + 3 CO_{2} + 3-methyl-1-(2,4,6-trihydroxyphenyl)butan-1-one

Thus, the two substrates of this enzyme are isovaleryl-CoA and malonyl-CoA, whereas its 3 products are CoASH, CO_{2}, and 3-methyl-1-(2,4,6-trihydroxyphenyl)butan-1-one.

This enzyme belongs to the family of transferases, specifically those acyltransferases transferring groups other than aminoacyl groups. The systematic name of this enzyme class is isovaleryl-CoA:malonyl-CoA acyltransferase. Other names in common use include valerophenone synthase, and 3-methyl-1-(trihydroxyphenyl)butan-1-one synthase.
