= MCCC2 =

Identifiers
- Aliases: MCCC2, MCCB, methylcrotonoyl-CoA carboxylase 2, MCCCbeta, methylcrotonyl-CoA carboxylase subunit 2
- External IDs: OMIM: 609014; MGI: 1925288; GeneCards: MCCC2
Enzyme activity
EC #	BRENDA	ExPASy	KEGG	MetaCyc
6.4.1.4	↗	↗	↗	↗

Gene location (Human)
Chr.	Chromosome 5 (human)
Band	5q13.2	Start	71,579,531 bp
Band	5q13.2	End	71,658,706 bp

Gene location (Mouse)
Chr.	Chromosome 13 (mouse)
Band	13|13 D1	Start	100,085,038 bp
Band	13|13 D1	End	100,152,147 bp
RNA expression pattern
Bgee	Human / Mouse (ortholog); Top expressed in: myocardium of left ventricle; right adrenal cortex; secondary oocyte; right lobe of liver; left adrenal gland; right ventricle; rectum; left adrenal cortex; apex of heart; corpus epididymis / Top expressed in: proximal tubule; right kidney; interventricular septum; medullary collecting duct; brown adipose tissue; myocardium of ventricle; left lobe of liver; renal corpuscle; parotid gland; blastocyst; More reference expression data
BioGPS	n/a
Gene ontology
Molecular function	nucleotide binding; methylcrotonoyl-CoA carboxylase activity; ligase activity; protein binding; ATP binding
Cellular component	cytosol; mitochondrion; methylcrotonoyl-CoA carboxylase complex; 3-methylcrotonyl-CoA carboxylase complex, mitochondrial; mitochondrial matrix
Biological process	leucine catabolic process; biotin metabolic process; coenzyme A metabolic process; protein heterooligomerization; branched-chain amino acid catabolic process
Sources:Amigo / QuickGO
Orthologs
Databases	NCBI: entry; OMA: entry
Species	Human	Mouse
Entrez	64087	78038
Ensembl	ENSG00000131844; ENSG00000281742; ENSG00000275300	ENSMUSG00000021646
UniProt	Q9HCC0	Q3ULD5
RefSeq (mRNA)	NM_022132; NM_001363147	NM_030026
RefSeq (protein)	NP_071415; NP_001350076	NP_084302
Location (UCSC)	Chr 5: 71.58 – 71.66 Mb	Chr 13: 100.09 – 100.15 Mb
PubMed search
- Wikidata
View/Edit Human	View/Edit Mouse

Methylcrotonoyl-CoA carboxylase subunit beta is an enzyme that in humans is encoded by the MCCC2 gene.

== Function ==
MCCC2 encodes the β-subunit of the mitochondrial enzyme methylcrotonoyl-CoA carboxylase (MCC), which catalyzes the biotin-dependent carboxylation of 3-methylcrotonoyl-CoA to 3-methylglutaconyl-CoA in the catabolic pathway of the branched-chain amino acid leucine. The β-subunit encoded by MCCC2 contains the carboxyltransferase domain that forms active sites at the interface of β-subunit dimers within the MCC α6β6 holoenzyme.

== Clinical significance ==
Pathogenic variants in MCCC2 cause 3-methylcrotonyl-CoA carboxylase deficiency, an autosomal recessive inborn error of leucine metabolism that can manifest with metabolic acidosis, developmental delay, or remain clinically asymptomatic. Beyond its metabolic role, MCCC2 has been implicated in tumorigenesis through modulation of mitochondrial dynamics, apoptosis, and energy metabolism, promoting cell proliferation and migration in prostate and colorectal cancers via pathways such as GLUD1–p38 MAPK signaling.
