= Β-Leucine =

β-Leucine

Names
- Preferred IUPAC name 3-Amino-4-methylpentanoic acid
- Other names DL-β-Leucine; Homovaline

Identifiers
CAS Number	5699-54-7
3D model (JSmol)	Interactive image
ChEBI	CHEBI:15604
ChemSpider	167837
ECHA InfoCard	100.200.152
KEGG	C02486
PubChem CID	2761558
CompTox Dashboard (EPA)	DTXSID50863602
- InChI: InChI=1S/C6H13NO2/c1-4(2)5(7)3-6(8)9/h4-5H,3,7H2,1-2H3,(H,8,9) Key: GLUJNGJDHCTUJY-UHFFFAOYSA-N
- SMILES: CC(C)C(CC(=O)O)N

Properties
Chemical formula	C_{6}H_{13}NO_{2}
Molar mass	131.175 g·mol^{−1}

Hazards
- GHS labelling
Pictograms	(GHS07: Exclamation mark)
Signal word	Warning
Hazard statements	H315, H319, H335
Precautionary statements	P261, P264, P271, P280, P302+P352, P304+P340, P305+P351+P338, P312, P321, P332+P313, P337+P313, P362, P403+P233, P405, P501
- Except where otherwise noted, data are given for materials in their standard state (at 25 °C [77 °F], 100 kPa). Infobox references

β-Leucine (beta-leucine) is a beta amino acid and positional isomer of L-leucine which is naturally produced in humans via the metabolism of L-leucine by the enzyme leucine 2,3-aminomutase. In cobalamin (vitamin B_{12}) deficient individuals, plasma concentrations of β-leucine are elevated.

== Biosynthesis and metabolism in humans ==
A small fraction of L-leucine metabolism – less than 5% in all tissues except the testes where it accounts for about 33% – is initially catalyzed by leucine aminomutase, producing β-leucine, which is subsequently metabolized into β-ketoisocaproate (β-KIC), β-ketoisocaproyl-CoA, and then acetyl-CoA by a series of uncharacterized enzymes.
