= Ketoisocaproic acid =

Ketoisocaproic acid may refer to:

- α-Ketoisocaproic acid
- β-Ketoisocaproic acid

The conjugate base and carboxylate form is ketoisocaproate.
