= Metabolic Technologies, Inc. =

Metabolic Technologies
- Company type: Private
- Industry: Life Sciences; Dietary supplements; Analytical services
- Founded: 1990
- Founder: Steven L. Nissen, Naji N. Abumrad
- Headquarters: Ames, Iowa
- Area served: Worldwide
- Key people: Shawn Baier (Chief Operating Officer), John A. Rathmacher (Laboratory Director)
- Products: HMB
- Website: Official page

Metabolic Technologies, Inc is an American life sciences company that sells dietary supplements and analytical services. Metabolic Technologies is headquartered in Ames, Iowa.

The company has sponsored a number of clinical trials for the nutritional supplement HMB.
