= Juven =

Medical food used to treat muscle wasting associated with AIDS or cancer

Juven is a medical food that is manufactured by Abbott Laboratories and used to provide nutritional support under the care of a physician in individuals with muscle wasting due to AIDS or cancer, to promote wound healing following surgery or injury, or when otherwise recommended by a medical professional. It is a powdered nutritional supplement that contains 3 grams of calcium β-hydroxy β-methylbutyrate, 14 grams of L-arginine, and 14 grams of L-glutamine per two daily servings.

Juven has been shown to increase lean body mass during clinical trials in individuals with AIDS and cancer, but not rheumatoid cachexia. Clinical trials with Juven for AIDS have also demonstrated improvements in immune status, as measured by a reduced HIV viral load relative to controls and higher CD3^{+} and CD8^{+} cell counts. (Note: Since all T cells are CD3^{+}, a measure of CD3^{+} cells is used as a general estimate of total T cells.) The efficacy of Juven for the treatment of cancer cachexia was also examined in a phase 3 clinical trial which found a strong trend (i.e., p=.08) for an improvement in lean body mass relative to controls; however, according to the authors of the trial itself and a systematic review that included it, the trial did not adequately test the ability of Juven to prevent or reverse the loss of lean body mass in individuals with cancer cachexia since the majority of participants did not complete the study. Further research involving the treatment of cancer cachexia with Juven over a period of several months is required to adequately determine treatment efficacy.
