= 3-Methylglutaconyl-CoA =

Identifiers
CAS Number	6247-73-0; 9024-24-2
3D model (JSmol)	Interactive image
ChEBI	CHEBI:15488
ChemSpider	4444198
PubChem CID	1142
CompTox Dashboard (EPA)	DTXSID30274297
- InChI: InChI=1S/C27H42N7O19P3S/c1-14(8-17(36)37)9-18(38)57-7-6-29-16(35)4-5-30-25(41)22(40)27(2,3)11-50-56(47,48)53-55(45,46)49-10-15-21(52-54(42,43)44)20(39)26(51-15)34-13-33-19-23(28)31-12-32-24(19)34/h8,12-13,15,20-22,26,39-40H,4-7,9-11H2,1-3H3,(H,29,35)(H,30,41)(H,36,37)(H,45,46)(H,47,48)(H2,28,31,32)(H2,42,43,44)/b14-8+/t15-,20-,21-,22?,26-/m1/s1 Key: ZMMFWDHIXCPOHZ-XSVFPTIUSA-N
- SMILES: CC(=CC(=O)SCCNC(=O)CCNC(=O)C(C(C)(C)COP(=O)(O)OP(=O)(O)OCC1C(C(C(O1)N2C=NC3=C(N=CN=C32)N)O)OP(=O)(O)O)O)CC(=O)O

Properties
Chemical formula	C_{27}H_{42}N_{7}O_{19}P_{3}S
Molar mass	893.645 g/mol
- Except where otherwise noted, data are given for materials in their standard state (at 25 °C [77 °F], 100 kPa). verify (what is ?) Infobox references

3-Methylglutaconyl-CoA (MG-CoA), also known as β-methylglutaconyl-CoA, is an intermediate in the metabolism of leucine. It is metabolized into HMG-CoA.

== Leucine metabolism ==
Leucine metabolism in humans

Human metabolic pathway for HMB and isovaleryl-CoA relative to L-leucine. Of the two major pathways, L-leucine is mostly metabolized into isovaleryl-CoA, while only about 5% is metabolized into HMB.

== See also ==
- Methylcrotonyl-CoA carboxylase
- Methylglutaconyl-CoA hydratase
