= Leucine 2,3-aminomutase =

leucine 2,3-aminomutase

Identifiers
- EC no.: 5.4.3.7
- CAS no.: 59125-53-0

Databases
- IntEnz: IntEnz view
- BRENDA: BRENDA entry
- ExPASy: NiceZyme view
- KEGG: KEGG entry
- MetaCyc: metabolic pathway
- PRIAM: profile
- PDB structures: RCSB PDB PDBe PDBsum
- Gene Ontology: AmiGO / QuickGO
Search
- PMC: articles
- PubMed: articles
- NCBI: proteins

In enzymology, a leucine 2,3-aminomutase (EC 5.4.3.7) is an enzyme that catalyzes the chemical reaction

(2S)-alpha-leucine $\rightleftharpoons$ (3R)-beta-leucine

Hence, this enzyme is responsible for the conversion of L-leucine to β-leucine.

This enzyme belongs to the family of isomerases, specifically those intramolecular transferases transferring amino groups. The systematic name of this enzyme class is (2S)-alpha-leucine 2,3-aminomutase. This enzyme participates in valine, leucine and isoleucine degradation. It employs one cofactor, cobamide.
