= Leucine (data page) =

Chemical data page

The complete data for Leucine
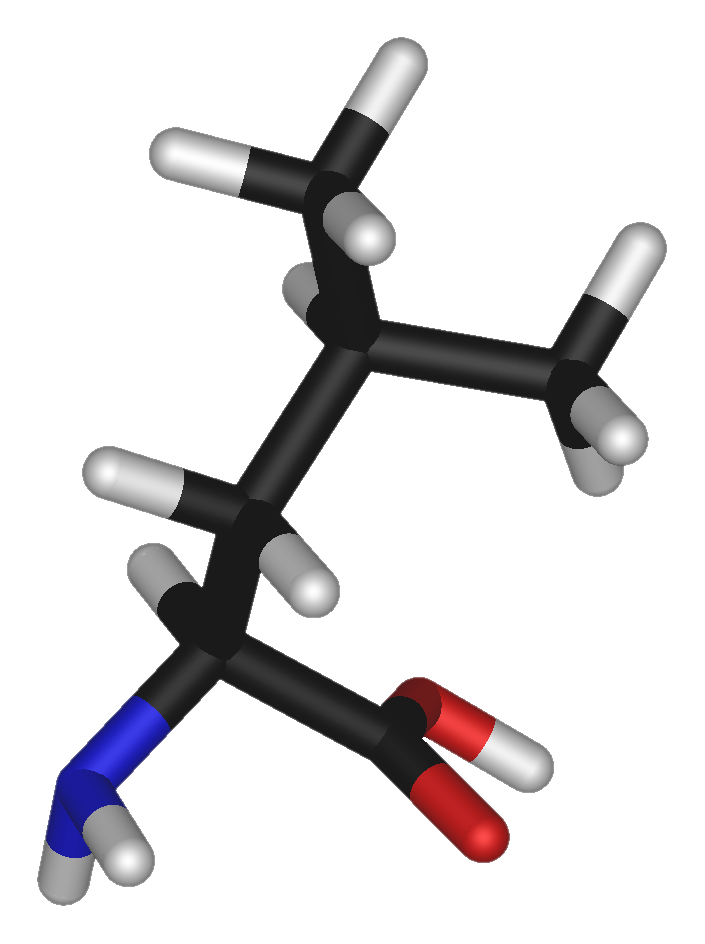
General information
Chemical formula: C_{6}H_{13}NO_{2}
Molar mass: 131.18 g·mol^{−1}
Systematic name:
(S)-2-amino-4-methyl-pentanoic acid
Abbreviations: L, Leu
Synonyms:
{(S)-/L-}2-amino-4-methylvaleric acid
4-methyl-norvaline
α-aminoisocaproic acid
Database data
SMILES: CC(C)C[C@@H](C(=O)O)N ^{a}
InChI=1/C6H13NO2/c1-4(2)3-5(7)6(8)9/h4-5H,3,7H2,1-2H3,(H,8,9)/t5-/m0/s1/f/h8H ^{b}

ATC: N/A	CAS: [61-90-5]	DrugBank: N/A	EINECS: 200-522-0	PubChem: 6106

Physical properties

Structure	Crystal data	Spectral data: UV–Vis / IR / NMR / MS

Phase behavior	Solid properties ρ_{solid}: 1.165 g.cm^{−3} T_{m}: 293 °C	Liquid properties	Gas properties

Hazard properties

MSDS N/A	Main hazards: N/A	NFPA 704	Flash point: N/A	RTECS number: N/A

Chemical properties

XLogP: -1.743 ^{c}	pI: 5.98 ^{d}	pK_{a}: 2.32; 9.58 ^{e}	Tautomers:	Hydrogen bond: donor - 2; acceptor - 3

Pharmacological properties

This box:
- Except where noted otherwise, data relate to Standard temperature and pressure.
- Reliability of data general note.
