= Fractional synthetic rate =

A fractional synthetic rate (FSR) is the rate at which a precursor compound is incorporated into a product per unit of product mass. The metric has been used to estimate the rate at which proteins, lipids, and lipoproteins are synthesized within humans and other animals. The formula used to calculate the FSR from a stable isotope tracer experiment is:

$$FSR=\frac{{\color{Blue}\text{initial rate of change in product enrichment}}}{\color{Green}\text{initial precursor enrichment}}$$
