= Methylcrotonyl-CoA =

Names
- IUPAC name 3′-O-Phosphonoadenosine 5′-[(3R)-3-hydroxy-2-methyl-4-{[3-({2-[(3-methylbut-2-enoyl)sulfanyl]ethyl}amino)-3-oxopropyl]amino}-4-oxobutyl dihydrogen diphosphate]
- Preferred IUPAC name O^{1}-{[(2R,3S,4R,5R)-5-(6-Amino-9H-purin-9-yl)-4-hydroxy-3-(phosphonooxy)oxolan-2-yl]methyl} O^{3}-[(3R)-3-hydroxy-2-methyl-4-{[3-({2-[(3-methylbut-2-enoyl)sulfanyl]ethyl}amino)-3-oxopropyl]amino}-4-oxobutyl] dihydrogen diphosphate

Identifiers
CAS Number	6712-03-4
3D model (JSmol)	Interactive image
ChemSpider	388909
MeSH	Methylcrotonyl-CoA
PubChem CID	439869
UNII	SZF9DF83AS
CompTox Dashboard (EPA)	DTXSID801343051
- InChI: InChI=1S/C26H42N7O17P3S/c1-14(2)9-17(35)54-8-7-28-16(34)5-6-29-24(38)21(37)26(3,4)11-47-53(44,45)50-52(42,43)46-10-15-20(49-51(39,40)41)19(36)25(48-15)33-13-32-18-22(27)30-12-31-23(18)33/h9,12-13,15,19-21,25,36-37H,5-8,10-11H2,1-4H3,(H,28,34)(H,29,38)(H,42,43)(H,44,45)(H2,27,30,31)(H2,39,40,41)/t15-,19-,20-,21?,25-/m1/s1 Key: BXIPALATIYNHJN-TVCSPYKZSA-N
- SMILES: CC(=CC(=O)SCCNC(=O)CCNC(=O)C(C(C)(C)COP(=O)(O)OP(=O)(O)OC[C@@H]1[C@H]([C@H]([C@@H](O1)N2C=NC3=C(N=CN=C32)N)O)OP(=O)(O)O)O)C

Properties
Chemical formula	C_{26}H_{42}N_{7}O_{17}P_{3}S
Molar mass	849.636 g/mol
- Except where otherwise noted, data are given for materials in their standard state (at 25 °C [77 °F], 100 kPa). verify (what is ?) Infobox references

3-Methylcrotonyl-CoA (β-Methylcrotonyl-CoA or MC-CoA) is an intermediate in the metabolism of leucine.

It is found in mitochondria, where it is formed from isovaleryl-coenzyme A by isovaleryl coenzyme A dehydrogenase. It then reacts with CO_{2} to yield 3-methylglutaconyl-CoA, catalysed by 3-Methylcrotonyl-CoA carboxylase.

== Leucine metabolism ==
Leucine metabolism in humans

Human metabolic pathway for HMB and isovaleryl-CoA relative to L-leucine. Of the two major pathways, L-leucine is mostly metabolized into isovaleryl-CoA, while only about 5% is metabolized into HMB.

== See also ==
- Methylcrotonyl-CoA carboxylase
