= Β-Ketoisocaproic acid =

β-Ketoisocaproic acid
- Skeletal formula of beta-ketoisocaproic acid

Names
- Preferred IUPAC name 4-Methyl-3-oxopentanoic acid
- Other names 4-Methyl-3-oxopentanoic acid 4-Methyl-3-oxovaleric acid Isobutanoylacetic acid Isobutyrylacetic acid

Identifiers
| CAS Number | 5650-76-0 |
| 3D model (JSmol) | Interactive image |
| ChEBI | CHEBI:29024 |
| ChemSpider | 389038 |
| KEGG | C03467 |
| MeSH | Beta-ketoisocaproic+acid |
| PubChem CID | 440024 |
| UNII | FWW4Q5U8HP |
| CompTox Dashboard (EPA) | DTXSID60331463 |
- InChI: Key: ZXLSKTZECNUVIS-UHFFFAOYSA-N
- SMILES: CC(C)C(CC(O)=O)=O

Properties
| Chemical formula | C_{6}H_{10}O_{3} |
| Molar mass | 130.143 g·mol^{−1} |
| Density | 1.1 g cm^{−3} (at 20 °C) |
| Boiling point | 236 °C (457 °F; 509 K) ±23 at 760 mmHg |
| log P | 0.36 |

Hazards
- GHS labelling
| Pictograms | (GHS05: Corrosive) |
| Signal word | Danger |
| Hazard statements | H314 |
- Except where otherwise noted, data are given for materials in their standard state (at 25 °C [77 °F], 100 kPa). Infobox references

β-Ketoisocaproic acid, also known as 4-methyl-3-oxopentanoic acid, is an intermediate in the metabolism of leucine. Its metabolic precursor and metabolic product in the leucine metabolic pathway are β-leucine and β-ketoisocaproyl-CoA, respectively.
