= Leucine =

- Skeletal formula of L-leucine

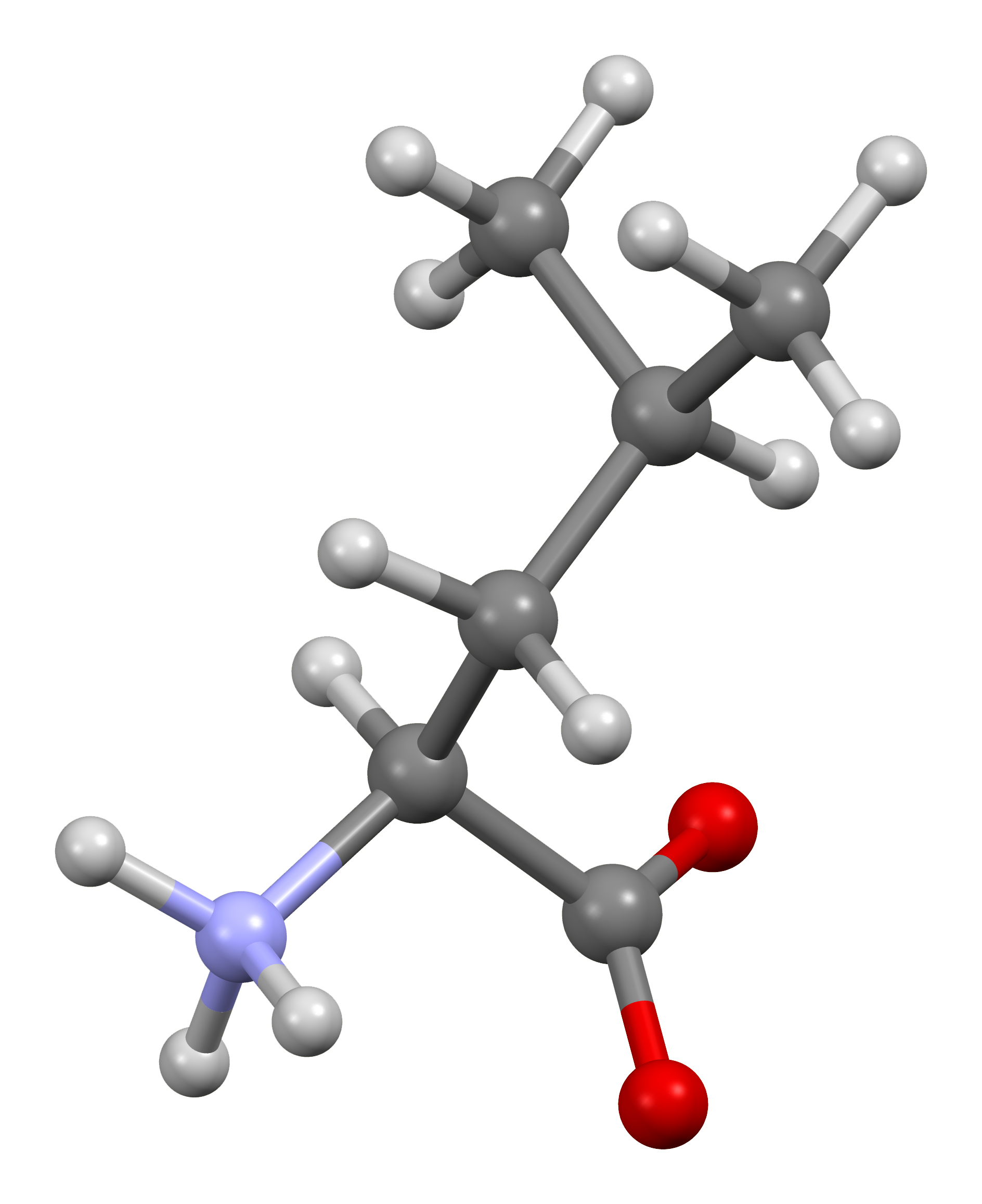
Ball-and-stick model
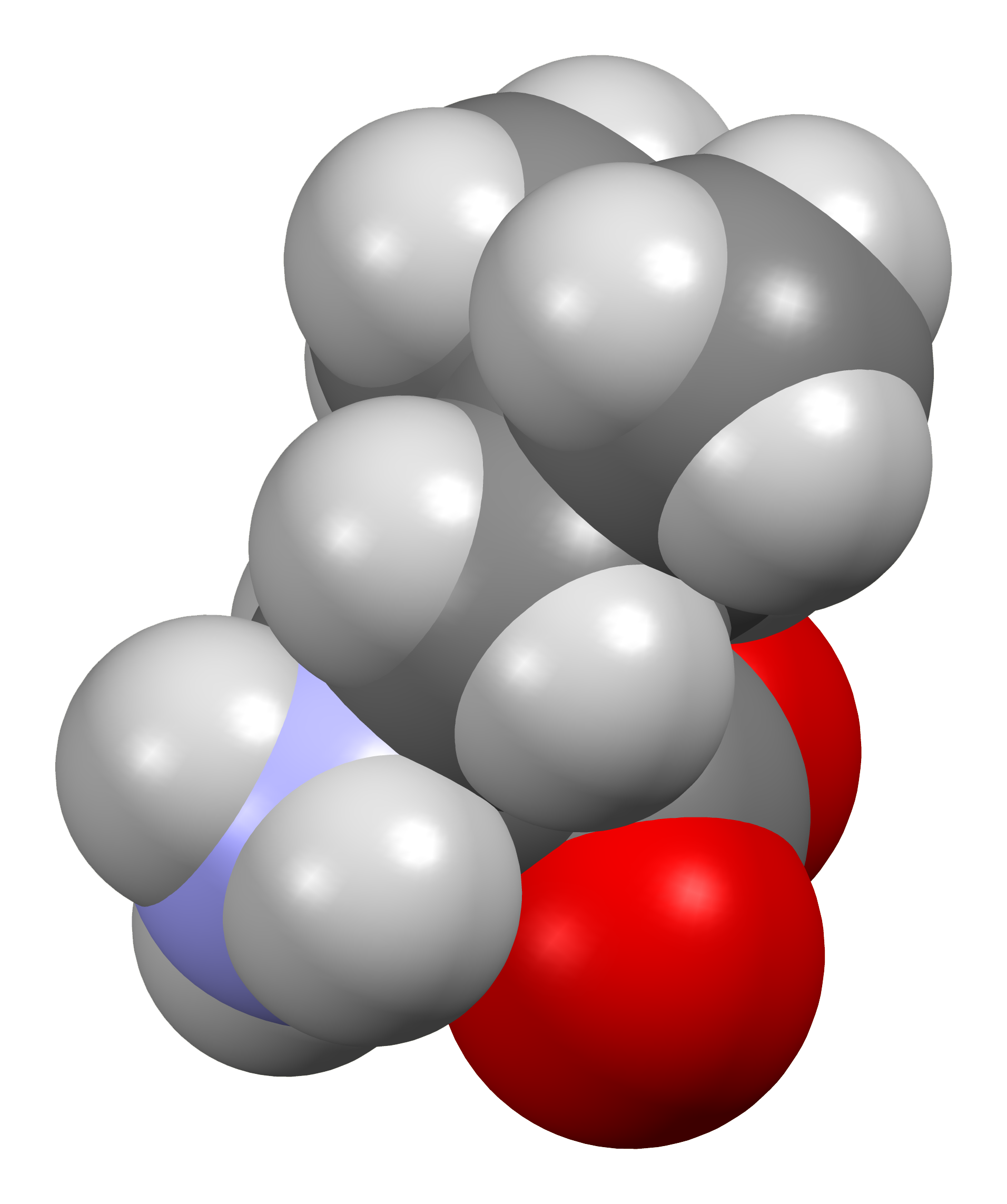
Space-filling model

Names
- IUPAC name Leucine
- Systematic IUPAC name 2-Amino-4-methylpentanoic acid

Identifiers
CAS Number	61-90-5
3D model (JSmol)	Interactive image; Zwitterion: Interactive image
ChEBI	CHEBI:15603
ChEMBL	ChEMBL291962
ChemSpider	5880
DrugBank	DB00149
ECHA InfoCard	100.000.475
IUPHAR/BPS	3312
KEGG	D00030
PubChem CID	6106
UNII	GMW67QNF9C
CompTox Dashboard (EPA)	DTXSID9023203
- InChI: InChI=1S/C6H13NO2/c1-4(2)3-5(7)6(8)9/h4-5H,3,7H2,1-2H3,(H,8,9)/t5-/m0/s1 Key: ROHFNLRQFUQHCH-YFKPBYRVSA-N; InChI=1/C6H13NO2/c1-4(2)3-5(7)6(8)9/h4-5H,3,7H2,1-2H3,(H,8,9)/t5-/m0/s1 Key: ROHFNLRQFUQHCH-YFKPBYRVBU
- SMILES: CC(C)C[C@@H](C(=O)O)N; Zwitterion: CC(C)C[C@@H](C(=O)[O-])[NH3+]

Properties
Chemical formula	C_{6}H_{13}NO_{2}
Molar mass	131.175 g·mol^{−1}
Acidity (pK_{a})	2.36 (carboxyl), 9.60 (amino)
Magnetic susceptibility (χ)	−84.9·10^{−6} cm^{3}/mol

Supplementary data page
- Leucine (data page)
- Except where otherwise noted, data are given for materials in their standard state (at 25 °C [77 °F], 100 kPa). Infobox references

Leucine ball and stick model spinning

Leucine or leucin (symbol Leu or L) is an essential amino acid that is used in the biosynthesis of proteins. Leucine is an α-amino acid, meaning it contains an α-amino group (which is in the protonated −NH_{3}^{+} form under biological conditions), an α-carboxylic acid group (which is in the deprotonated −COO^{−} form under biological conditions), and a side chain isobutyl group, making it a non-polar aliphatic amino acid. It is essential in humans (and animals), meaning the body cannot synthesize it; it must be obtained from the diet. Human dietary sources are foods that contain protein, such as meats, dairy products, soy products, and beans and other legumes. It is encoded by the codons UUA, UUG, CUU, CUC, CUA, and CUG. Leucine is named after the Greek word for 'white': λευκός (leukós 'white'), after its common appearance as a white powder, a property it shares with many other amino acids.

Like valine and isoleucine, leucine is a branched-chain amino acid. The primary metabolic end products of leucine metabolism are acetyl-CoA and acetoacetate; consequently, it is one of the two exclusively ketogenic amino acids, with lysine being the other. It is the most important ketogenic amino acid in humans.

Leucine and β-hydroxy β-methylbutyric acid, a minor leucine metabolite, exhibit pharmacological activity in humans and have been demonstrated to promote protein biosynthesis via the phosphorylation of the mechanistic target of rapamycin (mTOR).

== Dietary leucine ==
As a food additive, L-leucine has the E number E641 and is classified as a flavor enhancer.

=== Requirements ===
The Food and Nutrition Board (FNB) of the U.S. Institute of Medicine set Recommended Dietary Allowances (RDAs) for essential amino acids in 2002. For leucine, for adults 19 years and older, 42 mg/kg body weight/day.

=== Sources ===
Food sources of leucine
Food	g/100g
Whey protein concentrate, dry powder	10.0–12.0
Soy protein concentrate, dry powder	7.5–8.5
Pea protein concentrate, dry powder	6.6
Soybeans, mature seeds, roasted, salted	2.87
Hemp seed, hulled	2.16
Beef, round, top round, raw	1.76
Peanuts	1.67
Fish, salmon, pink, raw	1.62
Wheat germ	1.57
Almonds	1.49
Chicken, broilers or fryers, thigh, raw	1.48
Chicken egg, yolk, raw	1.40
Oats	1.28
Edamame (soybeans, green, raw)	0.93
Beans, pinto, cooked	0.78
Lentils, cooked	0.65
Chickpea, cooked	0.63
Corn, yellow	0.35
Cow milk, whole, 3.25% milk fat	0.27
Rice, brown, medium-grain, cooked	0.19
Milk, human, mature, fluid	0.10

== Health effects ==
As a dietary supplement, leucine has been found to slow the degradation of muscle tissue by increasing the synthesis of muscle proteins in aged rats. However, results of comparative studies are conflicted. Long-term leucine supplementation does not increase muscle mass or strength in healthy elderly men. More studies are needed, preferably ones based on an objective, random sample of society. Factors such as lifestyle choices, age, gender, diet, exercise, etc. must be factored into the analyses to isolate the effects of supplemental leucine as a stand-alone, or if taken with other branched-chain amino acids (BCAAs). Until then, dietary supplemental leucine cannot be associated as the prime reason for muscular growth or optimal maintenance for the entire population.

Both L-leucine and D-leucine protect mice against epileptic seizures. D-leucine also terminates seizures in mice after the onset of seizure activity, at least as effectively as diazepam and without sedative effects. Decreased dietary intake of L-leucine lessens adiposity in mice. High blood levels of leucine are associated with insulin resistance in humans, mice, and rodents. This might be due to the effect of leucine to stimulate mTOR signaling. Dietary restriction of leucine and the other BCAAs can reverse diet-induced obesity in wild-type mice by increasing energy expenditure, and can restrict fat mass gain of hyperphagic rats.

== Safety ==
Leucine toxicity, as seen in decompensated maple syrup urine disease, causes delirium and neurologic compromise, and can be life-threatening.

A high intake of leucine may cause or exacerbate symptoms of pellagra in people with low niacin status because it interferes with the conversion of L-tryptophan to niacin.

Leucine at a dose exceeding 500 mg/kg/d was observed with hyperammonemia. As such, unofficially, a tolerable upper intake level (UL) for leucine in healthy adult men can be suggested at 500 mg/kg/d or 35 g/d under acute dietary conditions.

== Pharmacology ==
=== Pharmacodynamics ===
Leucine is a dietary amino acid with the capacity to directly stimulate myofibrillar muscle protein synthesis. This effect of leucine results from its role as an activator of the mechanistic target of rapamycin (mTOR), a serine-threonine protein kinase that regulates protein biosynthesis and cell growth. The activation of mTOR by leucine is mediated through Rag GTPases, leucine binding to leucyl-tRNA synthetase, leucine binding to sestrin 2, and possibly other mechanisms.

=== Metabolism in humans ===
Leucine metabolism in humans

Human metabolic pathway for HMB and isovaleryl-CoA relative to L-leucine. Of the two major pathways, L-leucine is mostly metabolized into isovaleryl-CoA, while only about 5% is metabolized into HMB.

Leucine metabolism occurs in many tissues in the human body; however, most dietary leucine is metabolized within the liver, adipose tissue, and muscle tissue. Adipose and muscle tissue use leucine in the formation of sterols and other compounds. Combined leucine use in these two tissues is seven times greater than in the liver.

In healthy individuals, approximately 60% of dietary L-leucine is metabolized after several hours, with roughly 5% (2–10% range) of dietary L-leucine being converted to β-hydroxy β-methylbutyric acid (HMB). Around 40% of dietary L-leucine is converted to acetyl-CoA, which is subsequently used in the synthesis of other compounds.

The vast majority of L-leucine metabolism is initially catalyzed by the branched-chain amino acid aminotransferase enzyme, producing α-ketoisocaproate (α-KIC). α-KIC is mostly metabolized by the mitochondrial enzyme branched-chain α-ketoacid dehydrogenase, which converts it to isovaleryl-CoA. Isovaleryl-CoA is subsequently metabolized by isovaleryl-CoA dehydrogenase and converted to MC-CoA, which is used in the synthesis of acetyl-CoA and other compounds. During biotin deficiency, HMB can be synthesized from MC-CoA via enoyl-CoA hydratase and an unknown thioesterase enzyme, which convert MC-CoA into HMB-CoA and HMB-CoA into HMB respectively. A relatively small amount of α-KIC is metabolized in the liver by the cytosolic enzyme 4-hydroxyphenylpyruvate dioxygenase (KIC dioxygenase), which converts α-KIC to HMB. In healthy individuals, this minor pathway – which involves the conversion of L-leucine to α-KIC and then HMB – is the predominant route of HMB synthesis.

A small fraction of L-leucine metabolism – less than 5% in all tissues except the testes, where it accounts for about 33% – is initially catalyzed by leucine aminomutase, producing β-leucine, which is subsequently metabolized into β-ketoisocaproate (β-KIC), β-ketoisocaproyl-CoA, and then acetyl-CoA by a series of uncharacterized enzymes.

The metabolism of HMB is catalyzed by an uncharacterized enzyme which converts it to β-hydroxy β-methylbutyryl-CoA (HMB-CoA). HMB-CoA is metabolized by either enoyl-CoA hydratase or another uncharacterized enzyme, producing β-methylcrotonyl-CoA (MC-CoA) or hydroxymethylglutaryl-CoA (HMG-CoA) respectively. MC-CoA is then converted by the enzyme methylcrotonyl-CoA carboxylase to methylglutaconyl-CoA (MG-CoA), which is subsequently converted to HMG-CoA by methylglutaconyl-CoA hydratase. HMG-CoA is then cleaved into acetyl-CoA and acetoacetate by HMG-CoA lyase or used in the production of cholesterol via the mevalonate pathway.

== Synthesis in nonhuman organisms ==
Leucine is an essential amino acid in the diet of animals because they lack the complete enzyme pathway to synthesize it de novo from potential precursor compounds. Consequently, they must ingest it, usually as a component of proteins. Plants and microorganisms synthesize leucine from pyruvic acid with a series of enzymes:

- Acetolactate synthase
- Acetohydroxy acid isomeroreductase
- Dihydroxyacid dehydratase
- α-Isopropylmalate synthase
- α-Isopropylmalate isomerase
- Leucine aminotransferase

Synthesis of the small, hydrophobic amino acid valine also includes the initial part of this pathway.

== Chemistry ==
(S)-Leucine (or L-leucine), left; (R)-leucine (or D-leucine), right, in zwitterionic form at neutral pH

Leucine is a branched-chain amino acid (BCAA) since it possesses an aliphatic side chain that is not linear.

Racemic leucine had been subjected to circularly polarized synchrotron radiation to better understand the origin of biomolecular asymmetry. An enantiomeric enhancement of 2.6% had been induced, indicating a possible photochemical origin of biomolecules' homochirality.

== See also ==
- Leucines, the isomers and derivatives of leucine
- Leucine zipper, a common motif in transcription factor proteins
