= Isovaleryl-CoA =

Names
- IUPAC name 3′-O-Phosphonoadenosine 5′-[(3R)-3-hydroxy-2,2-dimethyl-4-{[3-({2-[(3-methylbutanoyl)sulfanyl]ethyl}amino)-3-oxopropyl]amino}-4-oxobutyl dihydrogen diphosphate]
- Preferred IUPAC name O^{1}-{[(2R,3S,4R,5R)-5-(6-Amino-9H-purin-9-yl)-4-hydroxy-3-(phosphonooxy)oxolan-2-yl]methyl} O^{3}-[(3R)-3-hydroxy-2,2-dimethyl-4-{[3-({2-[(3-methylbutanoyl)sulfanyl]ethyl}amino)-3-oxopropyl]amino}-4-oxobutyl] dihydrogen diphosphate

Identifiers
| CAS Number | 6244-91-3 |
| 3D model (JSmol) | Interactive image |
| ChEBI | CHEBI:15487 |
| ChemSpider | 145017 |
| MeSH | isovaleryl-coenzyme+A |
| PubChem CID | 165435 |
| CompTox Dashboard (EPA) | DTXSID50978008 |
- InChI: InChI=1S/C26H44N7O17P3S/c1-14(2)9-17(35)54-8-7-28-16(34)5-6-29-24(38)21(37)26(3,4)11-47-53(44,45)50-52(42,43)46-10-15-20(49-51(39,40)41)19(36)25(48-15)33-13-32-18-22(27)30-12-31-23(18)33/h12-15,19-21,25,36-37H,5-11H2,1-4H3,(H,28,34)(H,29,38)(H,42,43)(H,44,45)(H2,27,30,31)(H2,39,40,41)/t15-,19-,20-,21+,25-/m1/s1 Key: UYVZIWWBJMYRCD-ZMHDXICWSA-N; InChI=1/C26H44N7O17P3S/c1-14(2)9-17(35)54-8-7-28-16(34)5-6-29-24(38)21(37)26(3,4)11-47-53(44,45)50-52(42,43)46-10-15-20(49-51(39,40)41)19(36)25(48-15)33-13-32-18-22(27)30-12-31-23(18)33/h12-15,19-21,25,36-37H,5-11H2,1-4H3,(H,28,34)(H,29,38)(H,42,43)(H,44,45)(H2,27,30,31)(H2,39,40,41)/t15-,19-,20-,21+,25-/m1/s1 Key: UYVZIWWBJMYRCD-ZMHDXICWBW
- SMILES: CC(C)CC(=O)SCCNC(=O)CCNC(=O)[C@@H](C(C)(C)COP(=O)(O)OP(=O)(O)OC[C@@H]1[C@H]([C@H]([C@@H](O1)n2cnc3c2ncnc3N)O)OP(=O)(O)O)O

Properties
| Chemical formula | C_{26}H_{44}N_{7}O_{17}P_{3}S |
| Molar mass | 851.652 g/mol |
- Except where otherwise noted, data are given for materials in their standard state (at 25 °C [77 °F], 100 kPa). verify (what is ?) Infobox references

Isovaleryl-CoA (also known as 3-methylbutyryl-CoA) is a metabolic intermediate formed during the catabolism of the branched-chain amino acid, leucine. It is a short-chain acyl-CoA thioester that plays a key role in mitochondrial energy metabolism. The compound is converted into 3-methylcrotonyl-CoA by the enzyme isovaleryl-CoA dehydrogenase (IVD), a flavoprotein that catalyzes the third step in the leucine degradation pathway. Deficiency of this enzyme activity results in the accumulation of isovaleryl-CoA and related metabolites, leading to a rare autosomal recessive disorder known as isovaleric acidemia, characterized by metabolic crises, developmental delays, and a distinctive odor due to isovaleric acid buildup. The metabolism of isovaleryl-CoA is vital for proper amino acid utilization and energy homeostasis in humans.

== Catalysis of isovaleryl-CoA dehydrogenase ==
The enzyme, isovaleryl-CoA dehydrogenase (IVD), part of the family of acyl-CoA dehydogenases (ACDs), is activated through the substrate binding of isovaleryl-CoA, within the hydrophobic pocket tailored to accommodate its branched alkyl chain. Upon substrate binding, conformational changes position the thioester group for hydride transfer to the flavin adenine dinucleotide (FAD) cofactor. This starts the dehydrogenation process, in which two hydrogen atoms are abstracted from the β and γ carbon atoms of isovaleryl-CoA, leading to the formation of a trans-double bond. This enzymatic step results in the conversion of isovaleryl-CoA (3-methylbutyryl-CoA) into 3-methylcrotonyl-CoA, marking the third reaction in the leucine degradation pathway in the Mitochondria.

IVD funcions as part of the electron transport flavoprotein (ETF) system, passing electrons from FADH_{2} to ETF, which would then transport those electrons to the electron transport chain. The electron transport chain establishes a gradient by pushing protons into the inner mitochondrial membrane, contributing to ATP synthesis. The conversion of isovaleryl-CoA into 3-methylcrotonyl-CoA is thus not only central to leucine metabolism but also links amino acid catabolism to oxidative phosphorylation.

Following this transformation, 3-methylcrotonyl-CoA, is carboxylated to form 3-methylglutaconyl-CoA, then is hydrated and cleaved into acetyl-CoA and acetoacetate – two energy rich molecules that enter tricarboxylic acid (TCA) cycle and ketone body production.
